= Westcombe Park =

Area of Blackheath, London, England

Coordinates: 51.484020°N 0.018458°E

- Location within Greater London
- OS grid reference: TQ402780
- London borough: Greenwich
- Ceremonial county: Greater London
- Region: London
- Country: England
- Sovereign state: United Kingdom
- Post town: LONDON
- Postcode district: SE3
- Dialling code: 020
- Police: Metropolitan
- Fire: London
- Ambulance: London
- UK Parliament: Greenwich and Woolwich
- London Assembly: Greenwich and Lewisham

Westcombe Park is a largely residential area in Blackheath in the Royal Borough of Greenwich, South East London, England. It is bounded by the main London-Dartford railway line to the north, the Blackwall Tunnel southern approach to the east, Blackheath to the south and a road, Vanbrugh Hill, to the west (named after the architect and playwright Sir John Vanbrugh who built his house Vanbrugh Castle nearby in Maze Hill).

Westcombe Park largely comprises the northern half of the Blackheath Westcombe ward of the Royal Borough of Greenwich, which in 2011 had a population of 12,875.

Westcombe is a topographical place name, derived from Combe, a common old English word for 'valley', often formed into a compound name - in this case with the adjective 'West'.

== Sites of interest ==
Much of Westcombe Park lies within the Westcombe Park Conservation Area, designated in 2002. Broadly, this covers an area bounded to the north by the stretch of railway line between Vanbrugh Hill and Westcombe Hill, to the east by the A102 Blackwall Tunnel southern approach, to the south by Westcombe Park Road, and to the west by Ulundi Road.

=== Woodlands House ===
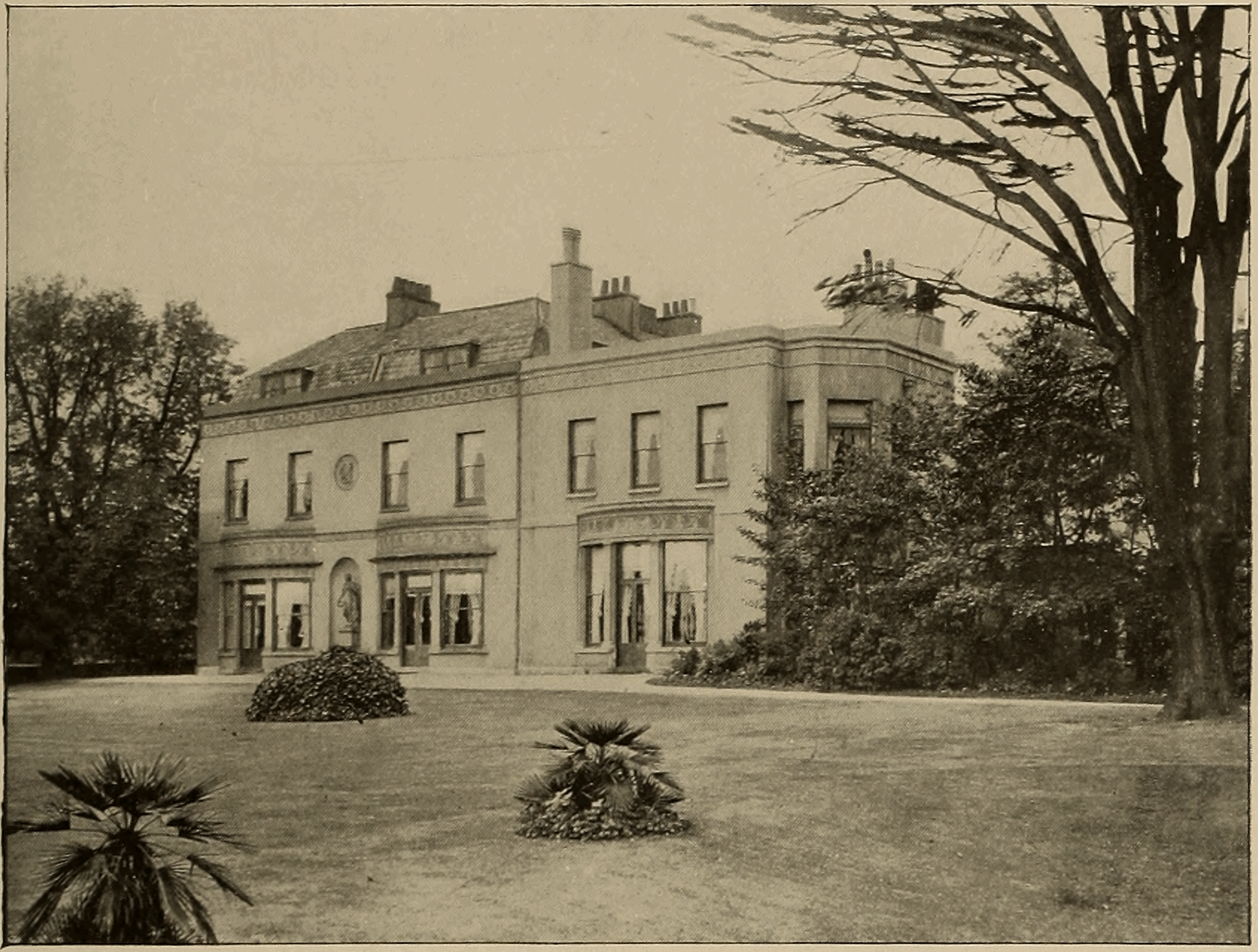
Woodlands House, in 1897

Its most notable existing landmark, and only Listed building (grade II), is Woodlands House, in Mycenae Road. This four-storey Georgian villa (architect: George Gibson) still lies in its own grounds and was built between 1774 and 1776 for John Julius Angerstein, a Lloyd's underwriter and merchant whose collection of old master paintings was bought for the nation in 1824, following his death, to form the nucleus of the National Gallery, London.

The Angerstein family continued to live in Woodlands House until about 1870. It was later acquired by Sir Alfred Yarrow, a shipbuilder, in 1896.

From about 1923, the house served as a convent; neighbouring Mycenae House (formerly Kidbrooke House) was built in 1933 to provide dormitory space for the Little Sisters of the Assumption convent. Woodlands was then acquired by the London Borough of Greenwich in 1967 and opened as a Local History Library and Art Gallery (Woodlands Art Gallery) in 1972, while Mycenae House continues to serve as a community centre. Woodlands was leased by the London Borough of Greenwich in November 2007 to The Greenwich Steiner school.

=== Westcombe Manor ===
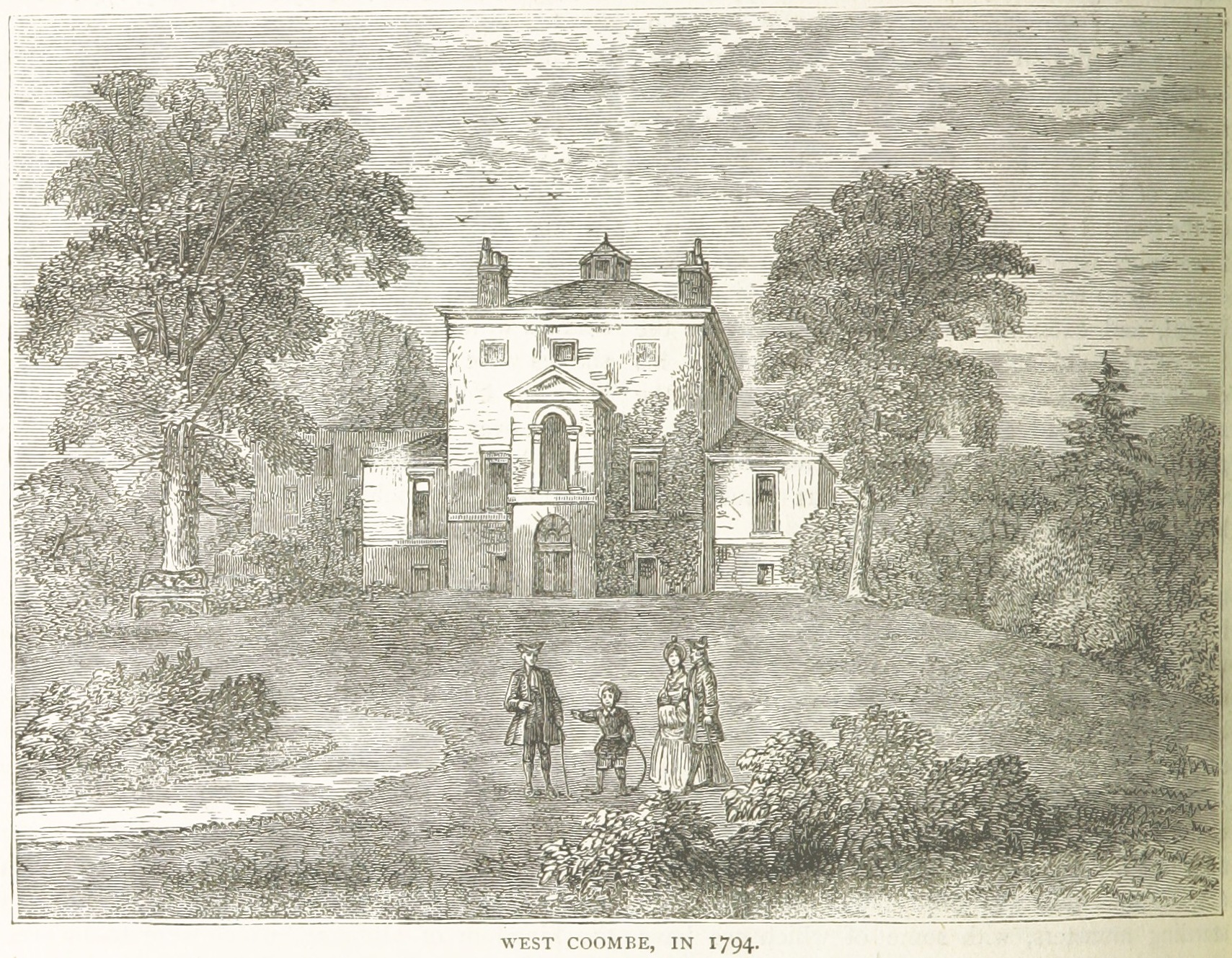
West Coombe Manor, in 1794

To the west of Woodlands House was Westcombe Manor, former family seat of the Ballards, the Lambardes, and Sir Theophilus Biddulph (1612–1683; see also Biddulph baronets). The original house was rebuilt in 1723 by Sir Gregory Page, and let to tenants who included Lavinia Fenton, Dowager Duchess of Bolton, who died at the house in 1760 (Peachum Road is named after a role, Polly Peachum, played by Fenton as an actress). In 1796, the building was described in Daniel Lysons' Environs of London:

"West-Combe-park, the site of this manor, was granted by Sir Gregory Page on a long lease to Captain Galfridus Walpole, (younger brother of Sir Robert, and uncle of the present Earl of Orford) who built the present house. The lease of West-Combepark afterwards came into the possession of Charles, third Duke of Bolton, who resided there for several years with Lavinia Fenton, the celebrated Polly Peachem, whom he married on the decease of his Duchess. The Duke died in 1754; Lavinia Duchess of Bolton in 1760, when West-Combe-park became the property of her son, the Rev. Mr. Powlett, in whom the remainder of the lease (which expires in 1824) is now vested. Since the Duchess's death WestCombe has been in the successive occupation of Lord Clive, the Marquis of Lothian, his widow the Marchioness, the Duchess of Athol, Mr. Halliday the banker, and William Petrie, Esq. It is now the residence of William Holmes, Esq. who has the remainder of an under lease granted to Mr. Halliday. West-Combe-house is situated on the verge of a steep hill, agreeably diversified with plantations, and commanding a fine view of the river."

It was later, from 1827, leased as the home of Deptford shipbuilder, shipowner and timber merchant Thomas Brockelbank (co-founder of the General Steam Navigation Company), after whose death, on 10 June 1843, it was eventually demolished in 1855.

=== St George's Church ===
St George's Church (on a sloping site on the corner of Kirkside Road and Glenluce Road) is a Victorian red-brick structure completed in 1892 (architect: Newman & Newman). As well as a place of worship it is also home to a Rudolf Steiner or Waldorf School-style nursery school.

=== Other ===
In the early 2000s, Westcombe Park was used as a location by the BBC soap opera EastEnders. The footbridge from which Andy Hunter, played by Michael Higgs, was pushed to his death is easily identifiable as the bridge (over the A102 Blackwall Tunnel southern approach) between Farmdale Road and Westcombe Park railway station.

== Amenities ==
=== Shops ===
At the foot of Westcombe Hill, there is a newsagent, a dry cleaner's, and a hairdresser's shop.

At the top of Westcombe Hill, the "Blackheath Standard" or "Standard" area has numerous shops including a Marks & Spencer's Simply Food outlet, a fish and chip shop, opticians, estate agents, a bakery, cafes, hairdressers, a Chinese restaurant and take-away, newsagents, a greengrocer, a butcher, fitness studios, a cycle shop, and a DIY shop. There is also a library and a post office. The library is equipped with wi-fi Internet access and has a range of music and video DVDs as well as books and journals.

=== Parks ===
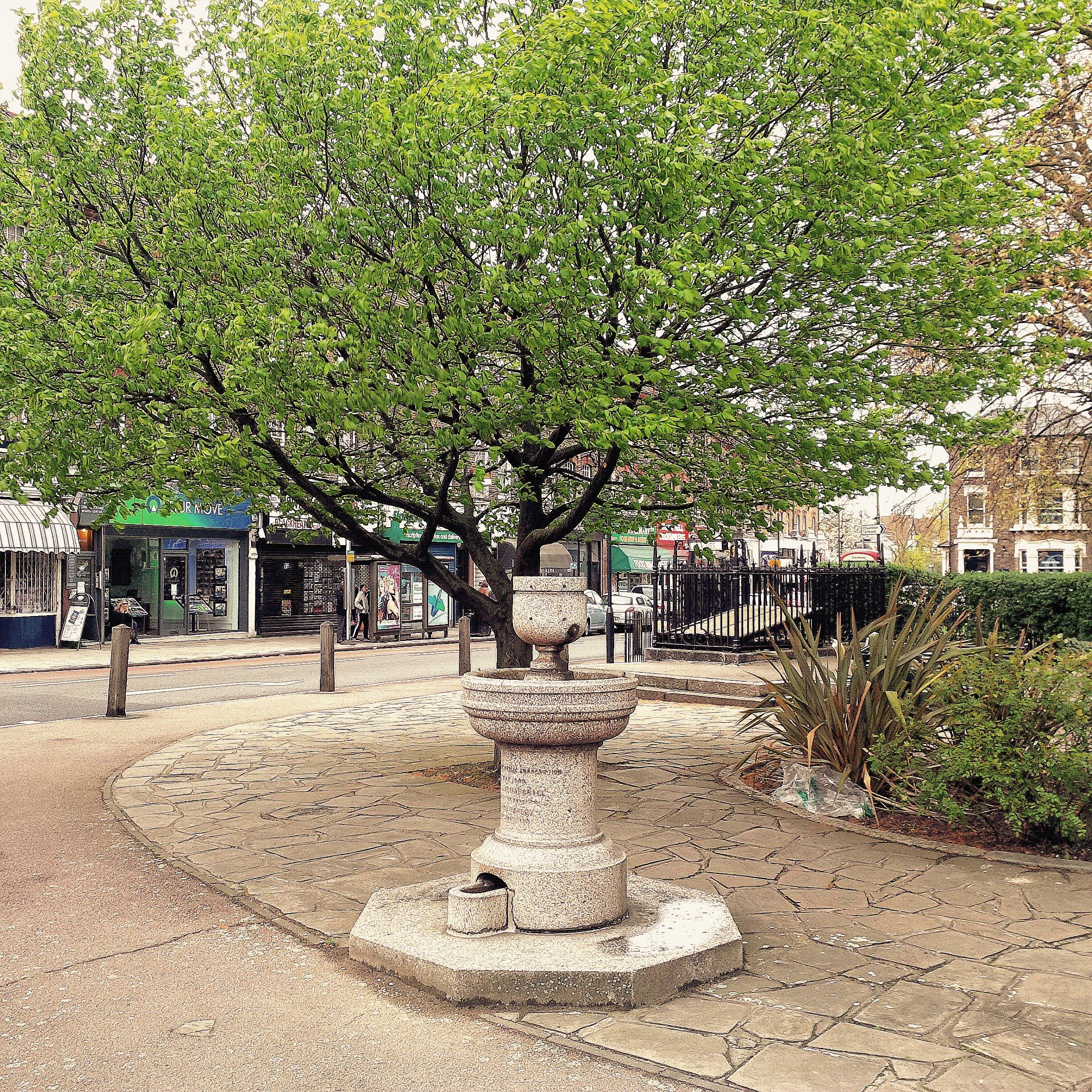
Batley Park memorial fountain

There is a small park in the centre of the Standard. It was originally a village green, known during the 18th century as Sheepgate Green, marking the intersection of four major roads. In the late 1880s, local philanthropist William Fox Batley and other local dignitaries, including the Rev John William Marshall, vicar of the nearby church of St John the Evangelist, began to campaign for local improvements. Batley's contribution is recorded in an inscription on a memorial fountain, unveiled in May 1889, and he is also commemorated by a stained glass window in the church. The central area was surrounded by railings and planted with new trees and shrubs, and new public lavatories were constructed from 1905 to 1907, and it became known as Batley Green or Batley Park, sometimes wrongly called Bartley Park.

=== Public houses ===
There are two public house in the Westcombe Park area - the Royal Standard (from which the Standard area takes its name) on the corner of Vanbrugh Park and Stratheden Road - and The Green Goddess, which opened in July 2022 in a former Barclays Bank building directly opposite the Royal Standard. There are four others nearby: the Angerstein Hotel and The River Ale House on Woolwich Road to the north, the Vanbrugh Tavern (briefly renamed the Duke of Greenwich) on Colomb Street to the west, and the British Oak on Old Dover Road to the southeast. There are also two licensed restaurants on Station Crescent, near Westcombe Park station, and a licensed bar in Mycenae House.

=== Healthcare ===
There are several dental and general practitioner surgeries around the Standard. Since the 2001 closure and later demolition of Greenwich District Hospital, situated at the northern end of Maze Hill, the nearest hospital is the Queen Elizabeth Hospital, London (run by Lewisham and Greenwich NHS Trust, which also manages University Hospital Lewisham - slightly further away).

Blackheath also has a notable number of 'alternative' health practitioners, e.g.: acupuncture, homeopathy, hypnosis, chiropracty and crystal healing.

=== Sport ===
Various sporting events take place in or close to Westcombe Park. Rectory Field, formerly the home of Blackheath rugby club, is located to the east, as is The Valley, home of Charlton Athletic football club. To the west, Greenwich Park hosts cricket matches and has tennis courts; to the southwest, Blackheath common is used for cricket and football; both park and common are popular with joggers and walkers. The London Marathon (which starts on Blackheath common) and (from 2008 to 2013) the Run to the Beat half marathon routes both took runners though the Westcombe Park area each year.

Westcombe Park rugby club was originally formed in Westcombe Park in 1904. Having since played on fields in Lee, Shooter's Hill and Sidcup, it currently operates from a sports ground in Orpington.

== Politics and government ==
Westcombe Park is covered by Greenwich and Woolwich constituency for elections to the House of Commons of the United Kingdom.

Westcombe Park is part of the Blackheath Westcombe ward for elections to Greenwich London Borough Council.

== Notable residents ==
- Stephan Andersen, former Charlton Athletic F.C. goalkeeper lived at 36 Westcombe Park Road during his time at the club.
- John Julius Angerstein, Lloyd's underwriter, merchant and art-collector lived at Woodlands House.
- Lavinia Fenton, Dowager Duchess of Bolton, actress lived and died (1760) at Westcombe Manor.
- Nick Ferrari, radio presenter.
- Malcolm Hardee, anarchic comedian lived briefly at 33 Glenluce Road, SE3 in the late 1990s.
- Jools Holland, TV personality and musician has a recording studio complex in Westcombe Park.
- Vic Reeves and Bob Mortimer lived in the area in the early days of their double act, and performed at the Tramshed in Woolwich.
- Sir Alfred Yarrow, shipbuilder lived at Woodlands House from 1896.

== Community newsletter ==
A local community newsletter, the Westcombe News, is produced by the local community association, the Westcombe Society. In 2005 it won the Newsletter section of the Walter Bor Media Awards.

== Transport ==
=== Nearby tube stations ===
- North Greenwich tube station - bus routes 108, 335 and 422 run from Blackheath Standard

=== DLR ===
Nearby DLR stations:

- Cutty Sark
- Greenwich (The same as the railway station)

=== Nearby railway stations ===
Westcombe Park essentially lies to the south of the railway line between Maze Hill and Westcombe Park stations.

- Maze Hill
- Westcombe Park

A little further away, there is:

- Blackheath
- Charlton
- Greenwich

=== Buses ===
The following buses run through Blackheath Standard and either through or around Westcombe Park:

- 108 between Lewisham station and Stratford station.
- 286 between Greenwich and Sidcup Queen Mary's Hospital.
- 335 between Kidbrooke and North Greenwich tube station.
- 386 between Blackheath village and Woolwich town centre.
- 422 between Bexleyheath shopping centre and North Greenwich tube station.
- 53 between Whitehall and Plumstead.
- 54 between Elmers End and Woolwich.
- 202 between Blackheath Standard and Crystal Palace.
