= Deptford Market =

Market in Deptford, London

Deptford High Street Market
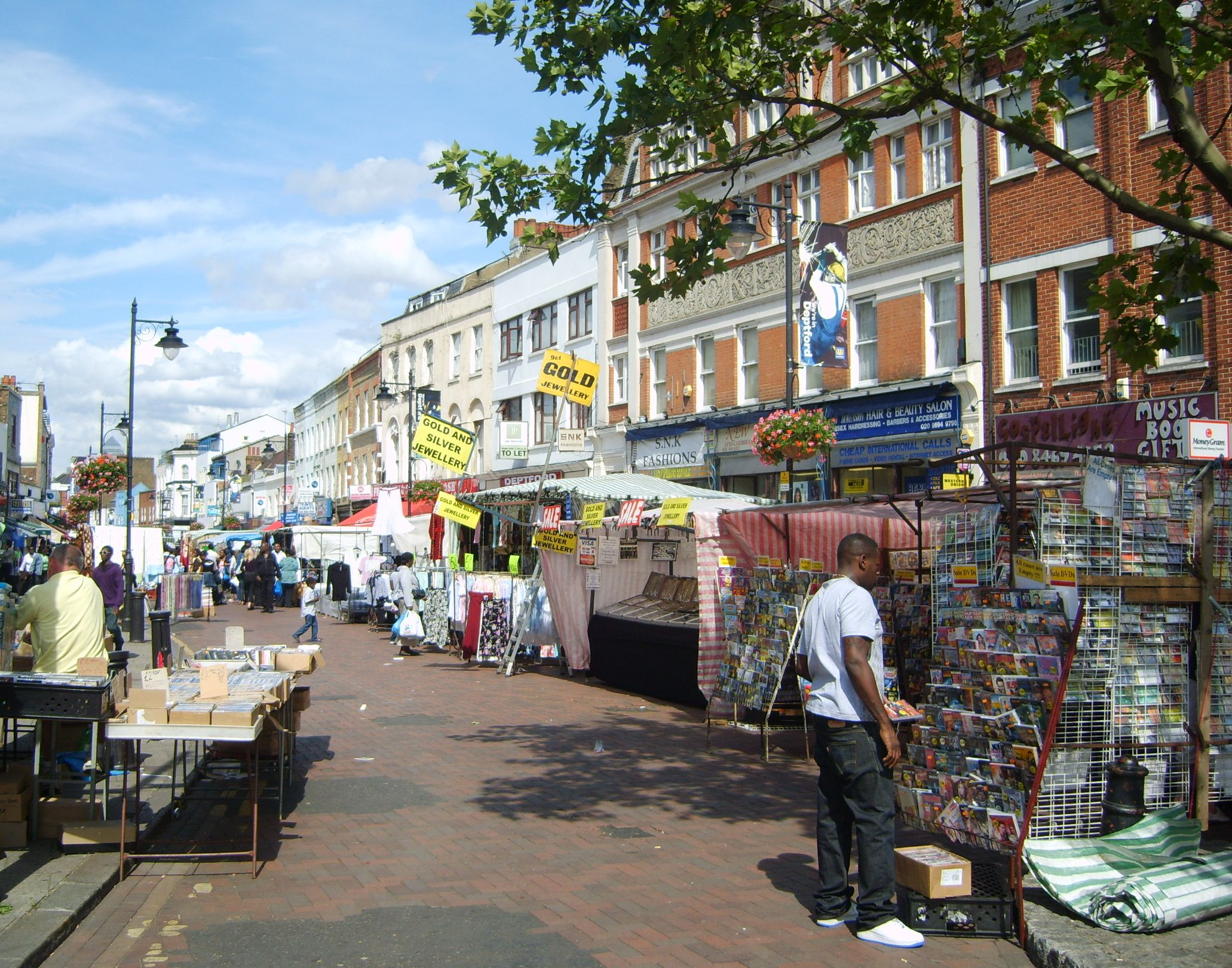
- Market from the south
- Location: Deptford High Street; Deptford, Lewisham, Greater London; 51.4777°N 0.0268°W
- Management: Lewisham London Borough Council
- Owner: Lewisham London Borough Council
- Environment: Outdoor
- Goods sold: General goods, food, antiques
- Days normally open: Wednesday, Friday, Saturday
- Number of tenants: 182
- Interactive map of Deptford Market

Deptford Market (also known as Deptford High Street Market) is a fruit & vegetable and antiques and bric-a-brac market located in Deptford, south east London.

== History ==
One of south London's busiest, the Deptford market has been in Deptford High Street for centuries. London's first railway, from London to Greenwich was built through Deptford in 1836. Christopher Marlowe, the playwright was murdered nearby.

Many of the stalls have passed from one generation to the other.

== Economy ==
A collection of new and used goods, with a prominence of food stalls spread out on the side streets and pavements, this vibrant market is filled with a diverse range of stallholders.

== Details ==
The market takes place every Wednesday, Friday and Saturday, from around 7am until 4pm, in Deptford High Street, Douglas Way and the junction with Giffin Street. To see the whole range of stalls it is best to visit before midday as some stallholders pack up early.

There is a broad mix of stalls selling items from fresh fish, foods, groceries, to antiques, second hand clothes and collectibles. Many of the stalls sell ethnic goods, including African, Indian and Chinese foodstuff.

It benefits in having a Docklands Light Railway Station and a National Rail Station close by.
