= Deptford High Street =

Street in the London Borough of Lewisham

Coordinates: 51.478°N 0.026°W

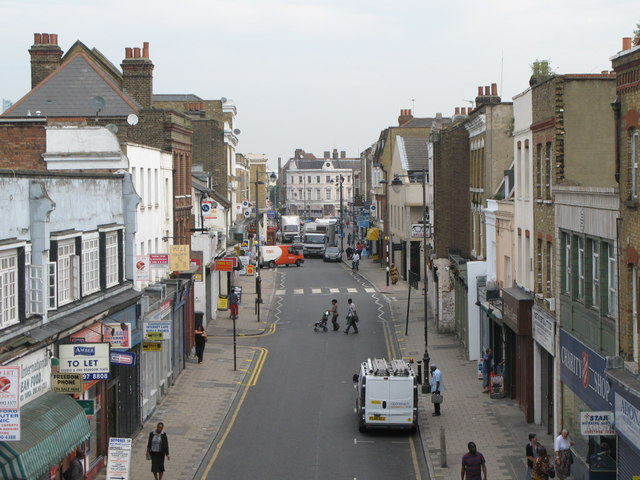
View of Deptford High Street

Deptford High Street is a street in the Deptford area of the London Borough of Lewisham in south east London. It runs northwards from its southern junction with New Cross Road/Deptford Broadway (A2) for approximately 0.5 miles (0.8 km) to Evelyn Street/Creek Road (A200).

The northern half of the street passes under Deptford railway station, operated by Southeastern, on the North Kent Line. Opened in 1836, and situated upon the London Bridge – Greenwich Railway Viaduct, Deptford station is reputedly the oldest railway station in London.

== History ==
Previously called Butt Lane, it got its current name in 1825.

When the social researcher Charles Booth visited the street in July 1899, it was considered the "Oxford Street of the South East of London". However, this comparison offered itself more with the section of the road south of the railway line, in which there are various shops and restaurants and in which a flea market takes place three times a week, than the quieter northern section.

At the end of the 19th / beginning of the 20th century, Deptford High Street was also shaped by German business people for decades. Booth has identified at least eight stores run by Germans, including a bakery, a butcher and a confectionery shop. With the outbreak of the First World War, anti-German sentiments affected the street. In October 1914, several German businesses were attacked, looted and set on fire and their owners were driven out. In the case of baker Goebel, not only was the bakery on the ground floor looted, but also his apartment above. An anti-German mob entered and threw everything out of the window onto the street, including a piano, bed, bedding, tables, chairs, porcelain and clocks.

Until the 1960s, the area was mainly populated by the white working class. Towards the end of the 20th century, the street changed again as a result of migration.

=== Murder ===
In March 1905, a shop at 34 Deptford High Street was the scene of a double murder, which led to the first murder trial in Britain where fingerprint evidence played a crucial part. Brothers Albert and Alfred Stratton killed Thomas and Anna Farrow, an elderly couple who tended George Chapman's oil and colour shop (today a newsagent) during a robbery. The Strattons were arrested, tried at the Old Bailey, found guilty, sentenced to death, and executed at Wandsworth Prison on 23 May 1905.

== The street today ==
As of 2020, there were only two pubs on Deptford High Street (The White Swan and The Jobcentre), where there used to be twelve. As of 2013, two former pubs were African restaurants, one pub had been converted into a nail salon, and another one was a youth centre.

Deptford Market is held every Wednesday, Friday and Saturday, centred in Deptford High Street, Douglas Way and Giffin Street. It has been considered as one of London's liveliest street markets; in February 2005, the High Street was described as "the capital's most diverse and vibrant high street" by Yellow Pages business directory, using a unique mathematical formula. In 2018, Time Out described the street:

"Over a quarter of a mile, it packs in a street market, a golden-clad library, one of London’s finest baroque churches, lots of Vietnamese restaurants and more history than you can shake a stick at."

The street has two purpose-built churches: the Anglican St Paul's, Deptford (described as one of London's finest Baroque parish churches in the Buildings of England series) and the Catholic Church of Our Lady of The Assumption, at 131 Deptford High Street. The street's final bank was set to close in early 2021.

In 2022, Time Out named the street as one of the world's coolest high streets, ranking at number 17. It added:

"It’s easy enough to tick off what makes Deptford High Street cool: independent shops, cafés, bars and restaurants."
