= London Bridge – Greenwich Railway Viaduct =

Series of railway viaducts in London, England

Coordinates: 51.4900°N 0.0549°W

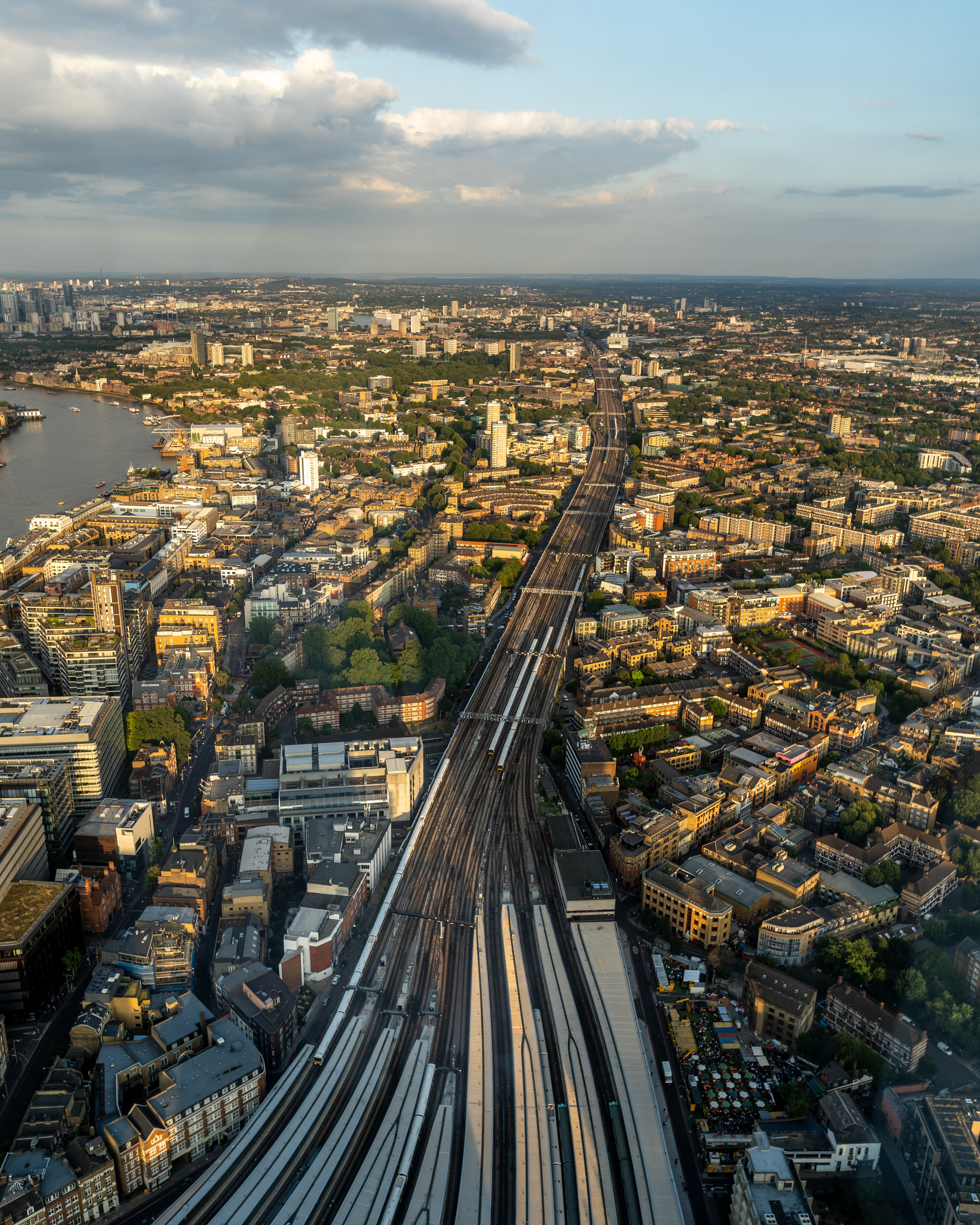
The viaduct viewed from The Shard

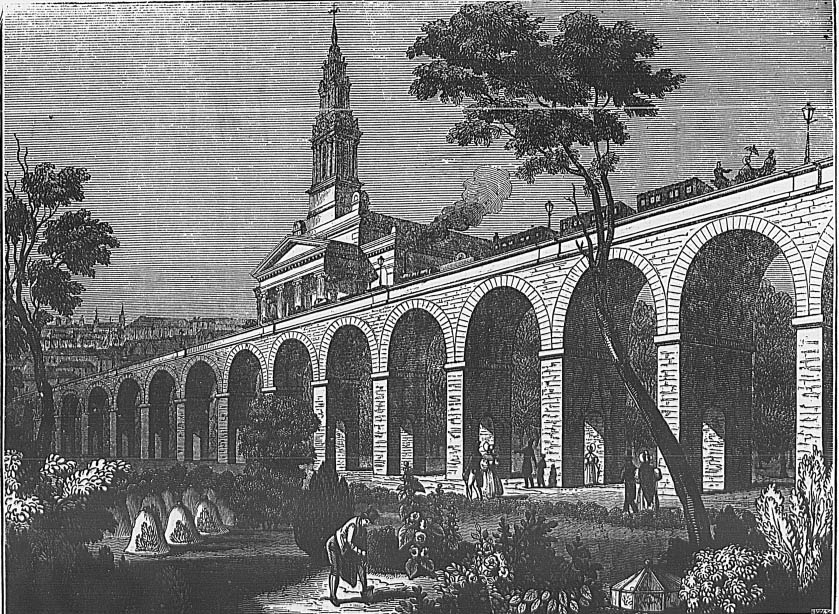
The viaduct near Bermondsey church in 1836

The London Bridge – Greenwich Railway Viaduct consists of a series of nineteen brick railway viaducts linked by road bridges between London Bridge railway station and Deptford Creek, which together make a single structure 3.45 miles (5.55 km) in length. The structure carries the former London and Greenwich Railway line and consists of 851 semi-circular arches and 27 skew arches or road bridges. It is the longest run of arches in Britain,

It is also one of the oldest railway viaducts in the world, and the earliest example of an entirely elevated railway line. It was built between 1834 and 1836. In 1842, the original viaduct was widened for 1.95 miles (3.14 km) of its length between Corbett's Lane and London Bridge on the south side to accommodate the trains of the London and Croydon Railway and London and Brighton Railway, and also for 2.65 miles (4.26 km) on the north side to accommodate the South Eastern Railway main line in 1850. It is a Grade II listed structure.

== History ==
The idea of a railway from London to Greenwich built on a viaduct, came from engineer Colonel George Thomas Landmann, and entrepreneur George Walter, and a company was floated on 25 November 1831, which obtained Parliamentary approval in 1833. The line was elevated to avoid numerous level crossings over the many streets which were already appearing in the south of London. The intention was for the line to descend to ground level after crossing the Grand Surrey Canal. This was opposed by Parliament, so it remained elevated as far as Deptford Creek on the River Ravensbourne, where there was a bascule bridge.

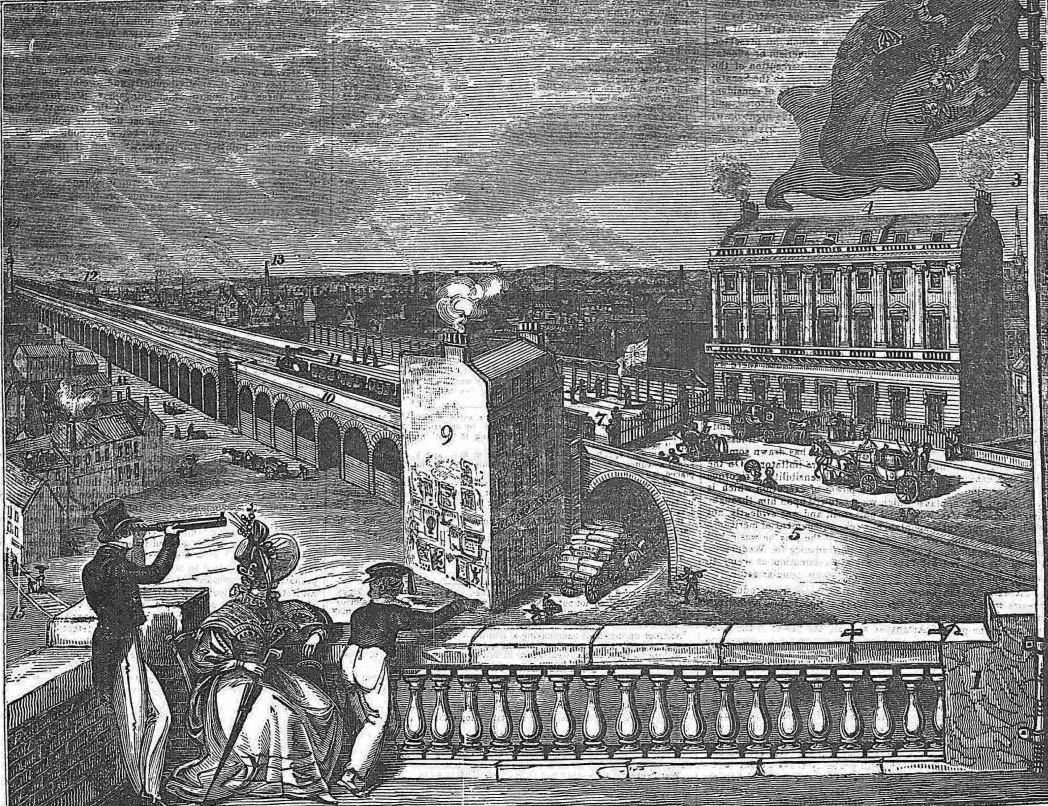
The viaduct at London Bridge railway station in 1836.

=== Original viaduct ===
The contractor was Hugh McIntosh, who used sixty million bricks to construct the viaduct, with 400 navvies using more than 100,000 per day, creating a shortage for other building activities in London. They were all made at Sittingbourne and transported to the site by barge. Work started on the foundations in February 1834, and in places they had to dig down 24 feet to get a firm foundation for the arches. The first experimental trains were run in 1835.

The structure was completed in December 1836, due to delays in obtaining materials for the Bermondsey Street bridge near to London Bridge. As originally constructed, the viaduct included a pedestrian boulevard where users could walk for a penny toll, but this was quickly replaced by an additional running line. The viaduct included the stations of London Bridge, Spa Road, Bermondsey (closed 1915) and Deptford. A further station on top of the viaduct at Southwark Park was opened in 1902, but also closed in 1915.

=== Corbett's Lane Junction ===
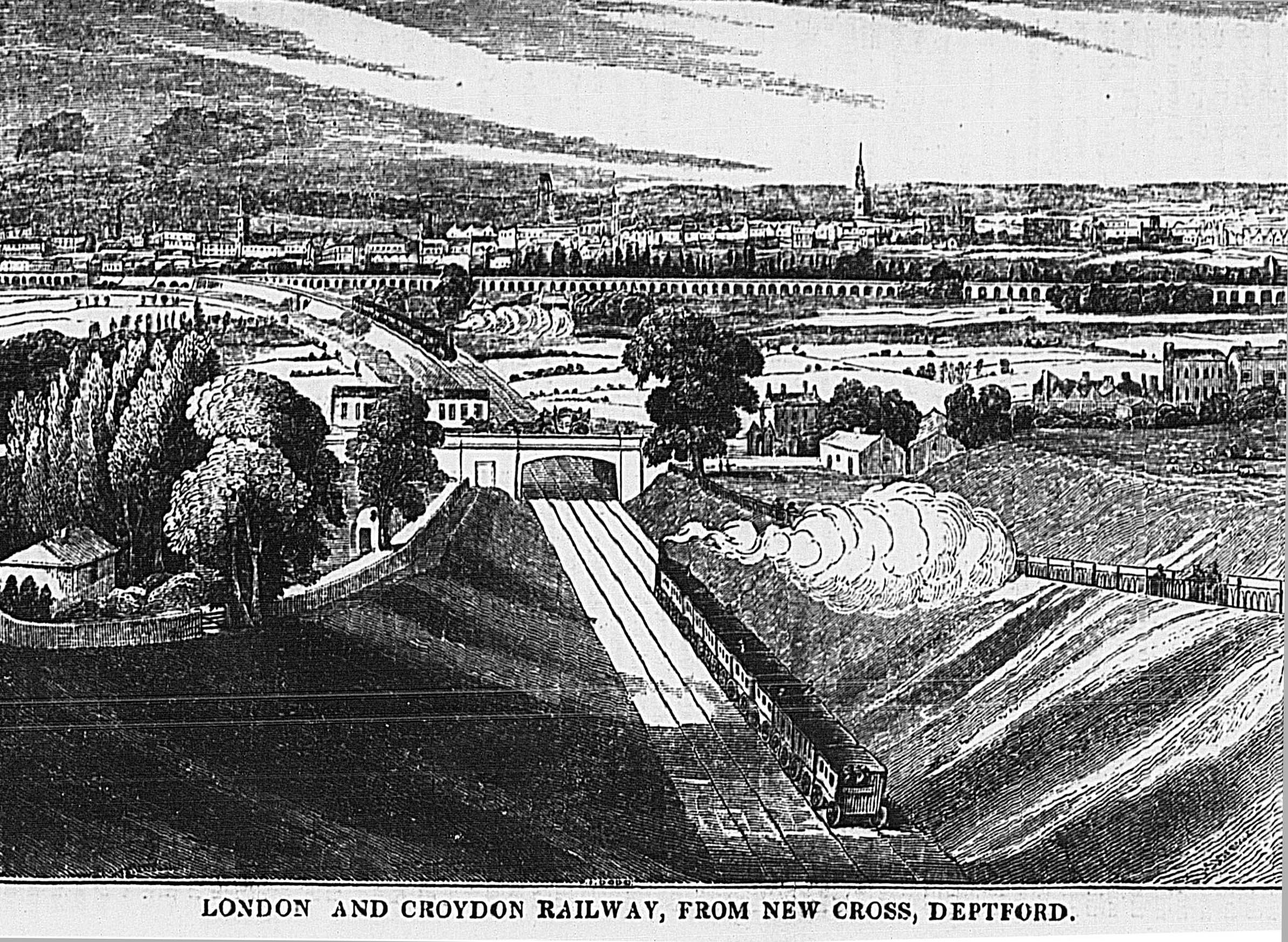
A March 1839 panoramic view from New Cross station showing the viaduct and Corbett's Lane Junction in the background

In 1838 and 1839 the London and Croydon Railway (L&CR) constructed a junction, with the viaduct leading to its own 800-foot (240 m) viaduct shortly after Corbett's Lane, Deptford, and thereafter shared the L&GR route to London Bridge. Corbett's Lane Junction became one of the first major railway junctions in the world'. A policeman was stationed at the junction to control the movements of the trains, who was soon situated on a wooden tower on the viaduct to give him better visibility. The Corbett's lane lighthouse, as it was known, was the precursor of the modern signal box.

=== Southern widening ===
The L&CR lines into London were shared with the London and Brighton Railway from 1841 and were due to do so with the Southeastern Railway (SER) from 1842. In 1841, it became obvious that the original viaduct would be inadequate to share the growing traffic of four railway companies, and so the L&GR constructed a second adjoining viaduct on the south side of the original as far as Corbett's Lane. This provided two further tracks, which together with the southern viaduct were later leased by the London Brighton and South Coast Railway, the successor to both the L&CR and the L&BR.

=== Northern widening ===
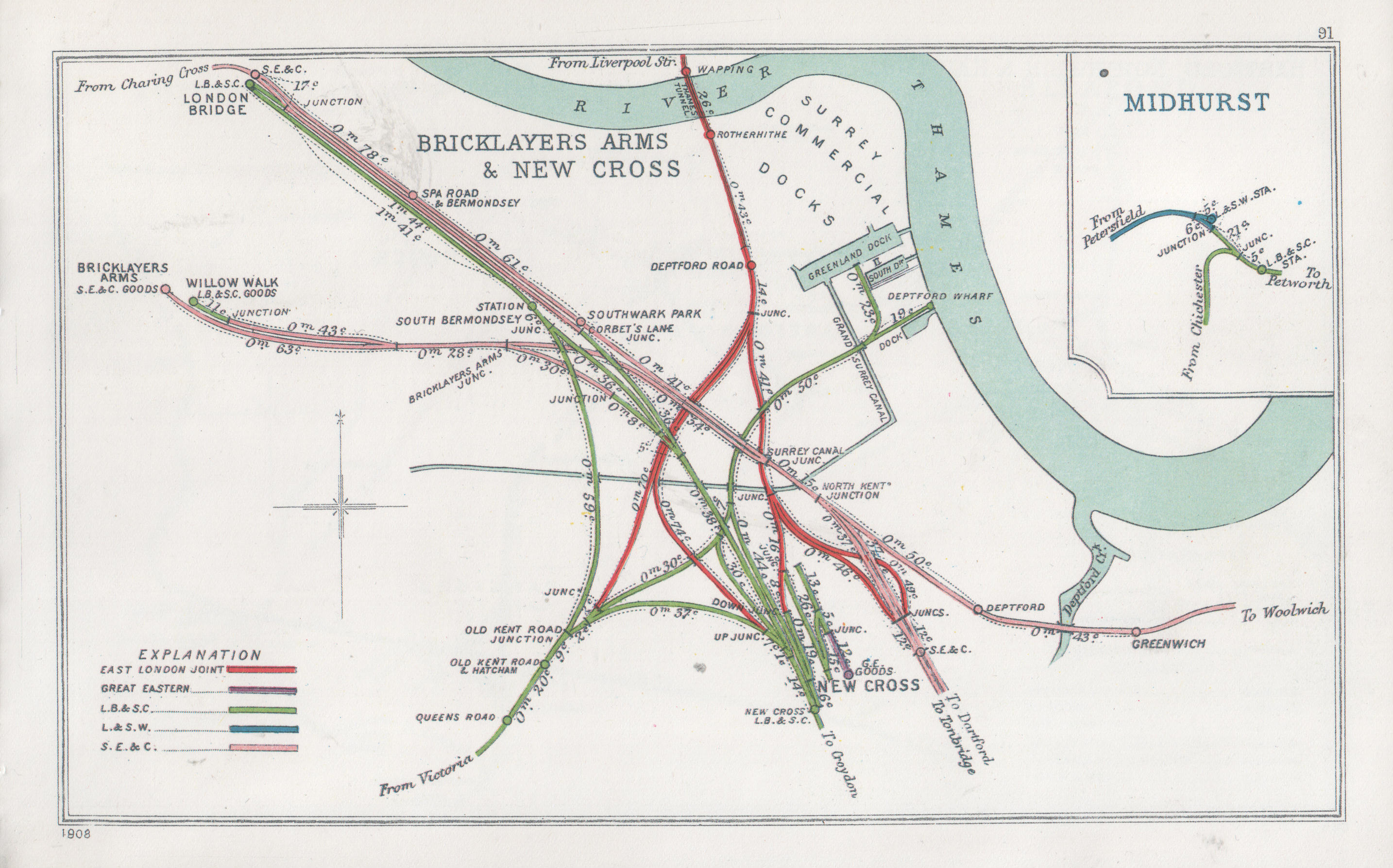
A 1908 rail map of the surrounding area. The viaduct supports the pink line from London Bridge to Deptford Creek

The SER leased the L&GR from 1845, and in 1847 obtained powers to widen the viaduct still further with the addition of two further lines for 2.65 miles (4.26 km) on the north side to accommodate the Southeastern Railway main line. This work was completed by 1850. The SER later constructed a link from this structure leading to its Bricklayers Arms branch line.

== Use of the arches ==
The London and Greenwich Railway directors originally envisaged using the arches for low cost housing, but were soon dissuaded of the plan. The arches are extensively used for light engineering workshops, scrap dealers, and lockups. In recent years some of the arches have been used for fashionable restaurants and nightclubs, and the "Bermondsey Beer Mile" area of craft breweries, tap rooms, and artisanal food producers.

== Gallery ==
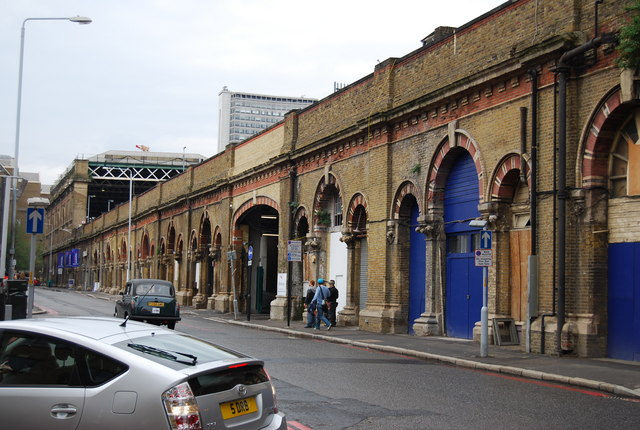
The western end of the viaduct at London Bridge railway station.

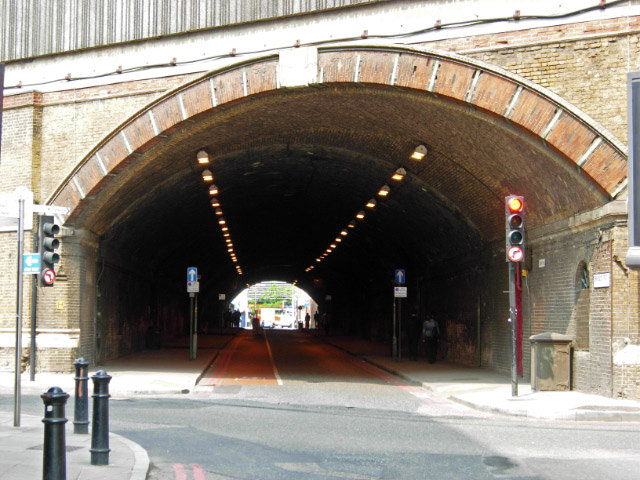
Bermondsey Street bridge, the final part of the structure to be completed.

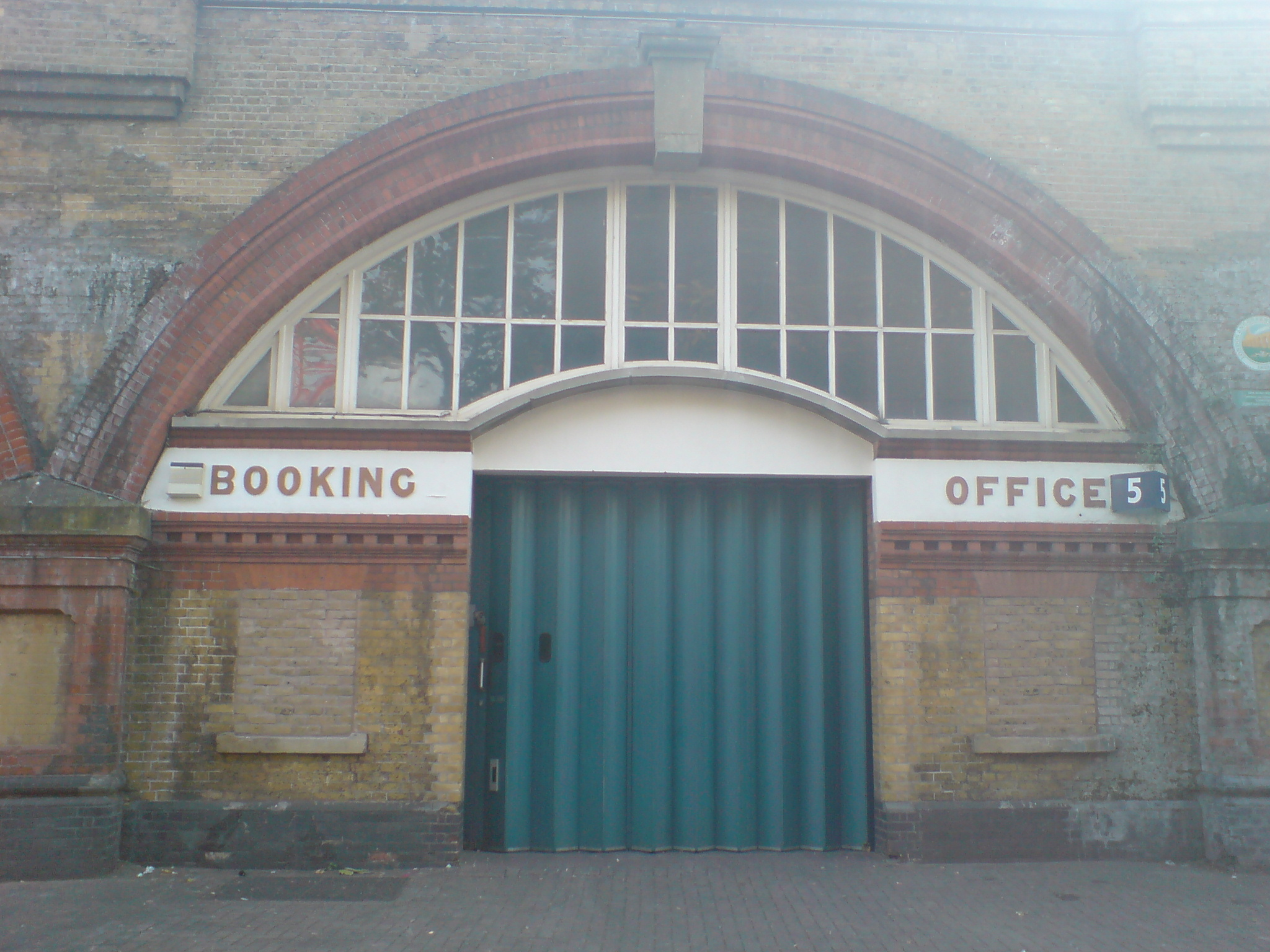
The Spa Road railway station was built into the viaduct.

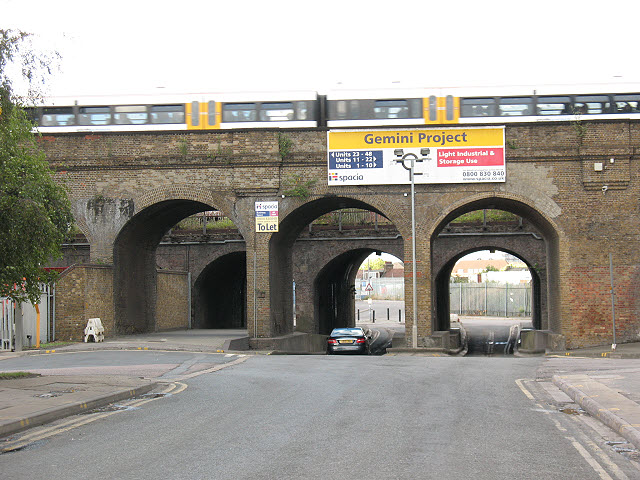
Viaducts on Landmann Way.

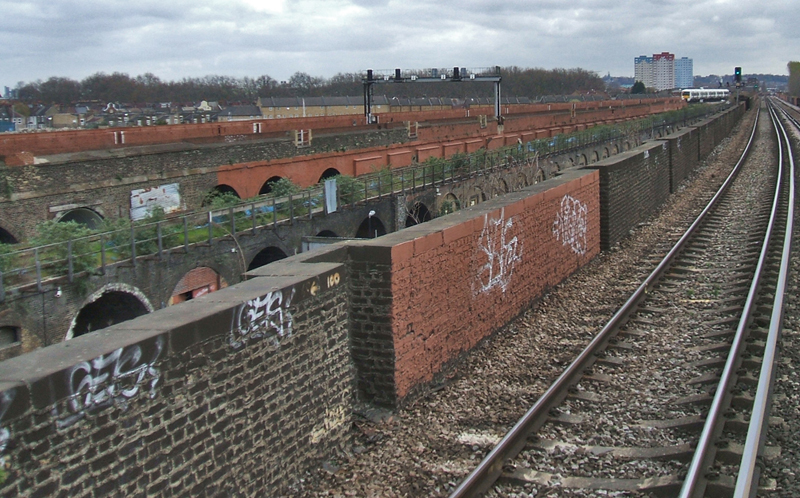
On top of the viaduct showing (r to l) the Brighton Main Line, the derelict Bricklayers Arms branch, the South Eastern Main Line and the Greenwich line.

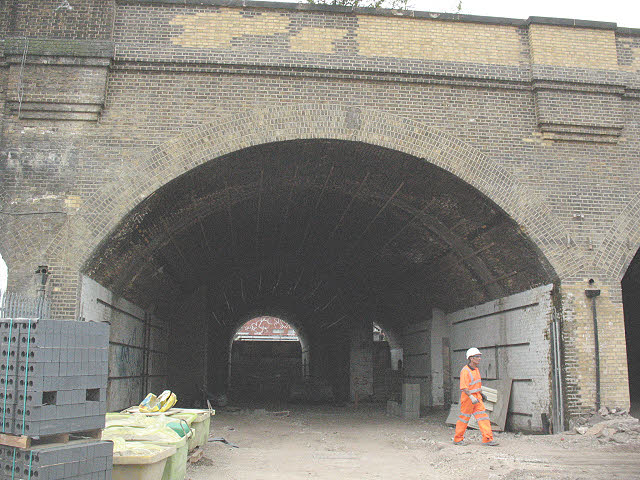
A close-up of an arch at Raymouth Road showing the three parallel viaducts.

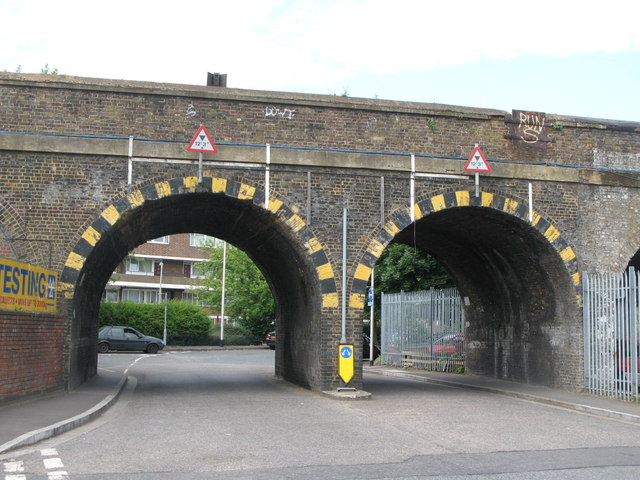
John Bull Arch, Southwark Park Road, Rotherhithe, London, SE16.

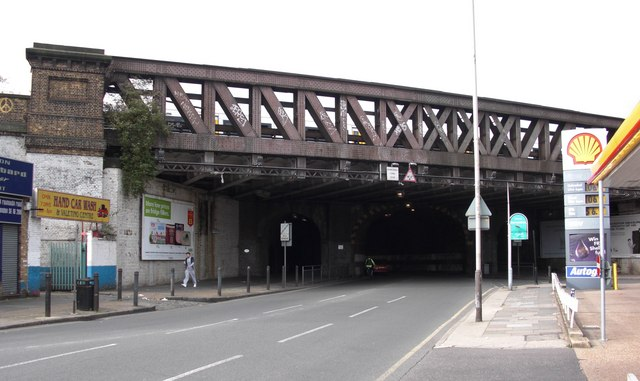
Railway bridge over Edward Street, SE8.

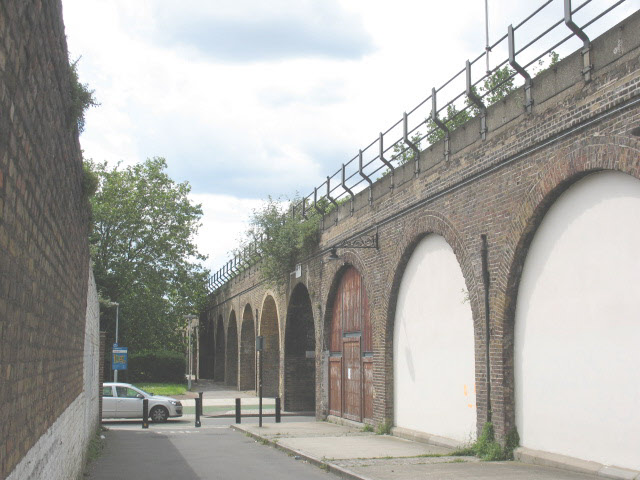
The viaduct at Deptford.

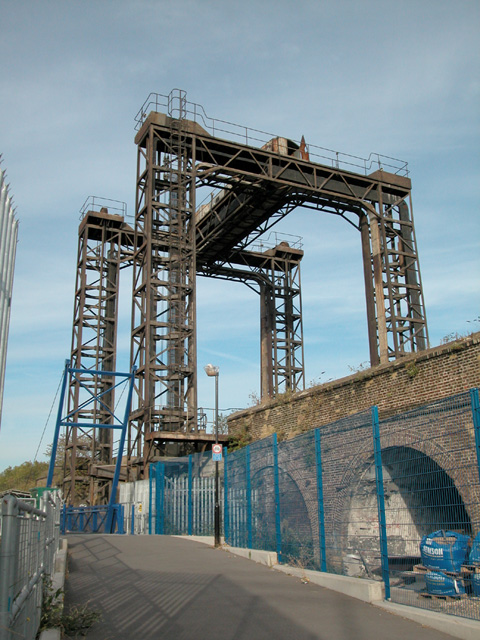
Deptford Creek lift bridge, the eastern end of the viaduct.

== See also ==
- List of railway bridges and viaducts in the United Kingdom

== Bibliography ==
- Gordon, W.J. (1910). Our home railways. Part 5 The South Eastern and Chatham. London: Frederick Warne.
- Nock, O.S. (1961). The South Eastern and Chatham Railway. London: Ian Allan.
- Turner, John Howard (1977). The London Brighton and South Coast Railway 1 Origins and Formation. Batsford. ISBN 0-7134-0275-X.
- Wolmar, Christian (2007). Fire and steam: a new history of the railways in Britain. London: Atlantic Books. ISBN 978-1-84354-629-0.
