= Westcombe Park railway station =

National Rail station in London, England

Westcombe Park
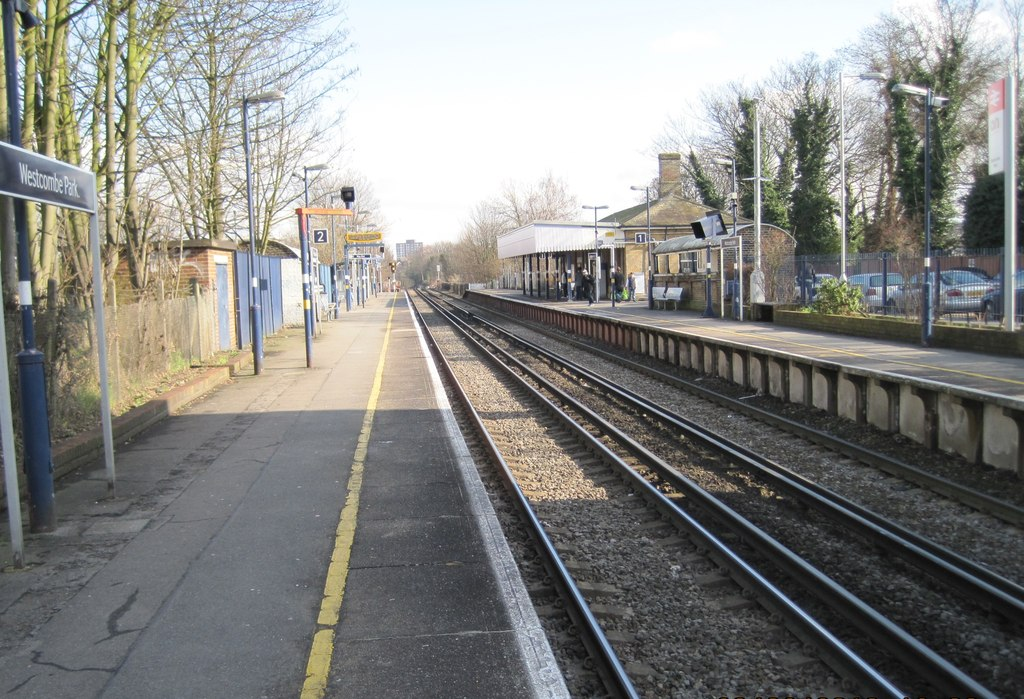
- Interactive map of Westcombe Park

General information
- Location: Westcombe Park
- Local authority: Greenwich
- Managed by: Southeastern
- Station code: WCB
- DfT category: D
- Number of platforms: 2
- Accessible: Yes
- Fare zone: 3

National Rail annual entry and exit
- 2020–21: ▼0.231 million
- 2021–22: ▲0.611 million
- 2022–23: ▲0.816 million
- 2023–24: ▲0.830 million
- 2024–25: ▲0.932 million

Key dates
- 1 May 1879: Opened

Other information
- External links: Departures; Facilities
- Coordinates: 51.4842°N 0.0187°E

Westcombe Park station is in Greenwich, London, and is situated on the Greenwich Line connecting suburbs (e.g.: Deptford, Greenwich, Charlton, Woolwich, to Dartford, Kent) along the south side of the River Thames with central London stations (London Bridge, Cannon Street and Charing Cross).

It is 5 miles 7 chains (8.2 km) down the line from London Bridge.

== History ==
The station was opened by the South Eastern Railway in 1879, the year after the through line from Greenwich to Maze Hill was finally completed. This connected the original London and Greenwich Railway to the North Kent Line just west of Charlton. The section between Charlton and Maze Hill had opened in 1873, with Maze Hill functioning as a terminus until 1878.

== Location ==
The station lies at the northern end of a conservation area (Westcombe Park), 5–10 minutes walk down Westcombe Hill from the Blackheath Standard area of Blackheath. It is the closest station to Woodlands House (once the home of John Julius Angerstein and later an art gallery and history archives centre), and is also close to the southern approach to the Blackwall Tunnel, a notorious traffic bottleneck.

== Services ==
Services at Westcombe Park are operated by Southeastern and Thameslink using Class 376, 465, 466, 700 and 707 EMUs.

The typical off-peak service in trains per hour is:

- 2 tph to London Cannon Street
- 2 tph to Luton
- 2 tph to Barnehurst, returning to London Cannon Street via Bexleyheath and Lewisham
- 2 tph to Rainham via Chatham

Additional services, including trains to and from London Cannon Street via Sidcup call at the station during the peak hours.

Preceding station	National Rail	Following station
Maze Hill	Thameslink Greenwich Line	Charlton
Maze Hill	Southeastern Greenwich Line	Charlton

== Connections ==
London Buses routes 108, 286, 335 and 422 serve the station.
