= Hugh McIntosh (civil engineer) =

- Born: 4 December 1768; Kildrummy, Scotland
- Died: 30 August 1840; Wakefield, England
- Education: Inverness Grammar School
- Occupation: Civil engineer
- Spouse: Mary Cross
- Children: David McIntosh

Hugh McIntosh (4 December 1768 – 30 August 1840) was a Scottish civil engineering contractor particularly associated with the construction of canals and docks, and also the first purpose-built passenger railway line in London.

== Career ==
McIntosh was born in Kildrummy near Nairn in 1768, apparently attending Inverness Grammar School before working as a navvy on the Forth and Clyde Canal and later the Lancaster Canal, where he first worked as a contractor.

While working on the Lancaster Canal, McIntosh met fellow Scot John Rennie who helped nurture McIntosh's career. McIntosh followed Rennie to London to work on the city's docks, and his growing reputation as an engineer led to him being recruited by the British government in 1809 in an ultimately unsuccessful attempt to demolish fortifications at Flushing.

McIntosh then invested in land and became a developer in the Mile End district of east London. In 1812, he bid for contracts to dig the Regent's Canal and, in 1815, to work on the Surrey Commercial Docks.

With a reputation for honesty and a business with sufficient resources to complete major projects, he became the leading contractor of his day, undertaking contracts including work on the British Museum, Hampton Court, Brighton Pavilion, Buckingham Palace (working for John Nash), the Gloucester Docks and Gloucester and Sharpness Canal (working for Thomas Telford), the Aire and Calder Navigation and Goole docks, dock works at Portsmouth and Southampton, the Mythe Bridge, and the London and Greenwich Railway.

In 1837, The Gentleman's Magazine celebrated the railway project saying:

"This great national work reflects the highest honour on the gallant proprietor, Colonel Landmann, no less credit on the contractor, Mr Macintosh, under whose orders no less than 60,000,000 bricks have been laid by human hands since the Royal assent was given to the Act of Parliament for its formation in 1833."

== Family life ==
He was married to Mary Cross. His brother James married Cross's sister.

McIntosh died of apoplexy on 30 August 1840 in Wakefield, England. The family tomb is in the grounds of St Matthias Community Centre, Poplar, London.
