= Southwark Park railway station =

Closed railway station in London, England

Southwark Park
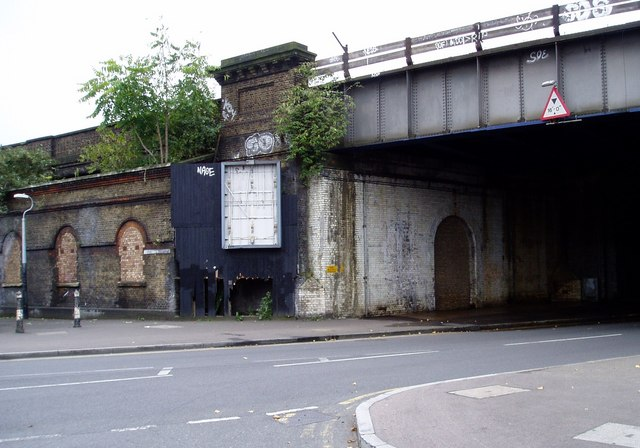
- Former entrance to Southwark Park station on Rotherhithe New Road in 2007
- Interactive map of Southwark Park

General information
- Location: Bermondsey
- Local authority: Southwark

Railway companies
- Original company: London and Greenwich Railway
- Pre-grouping: South Eastern and Chatham Railway
- Post-grouping: Southern Railway

Key dates
- 1 October 1902: Opened as Southwark Park
- 15 March 1915: Closed to passenger traffic
- 21 September 1925: Closed completely

Other information
- Coordinates: 51.4893°N 0.0531°W

Southwark Park was a railway station in Bermondsey, south-east London, on the Greenwich Line between Spa Road and Deptford. It was opened by the South Eastern and Chatham Railway on 1 October 1902, on approximately the same site as the then long-closed Commercial Dock railway station. It was close to the southern end of Southwark Park, from which it took its name. South Bermondsey railway station, on the South London Line, is nearby.

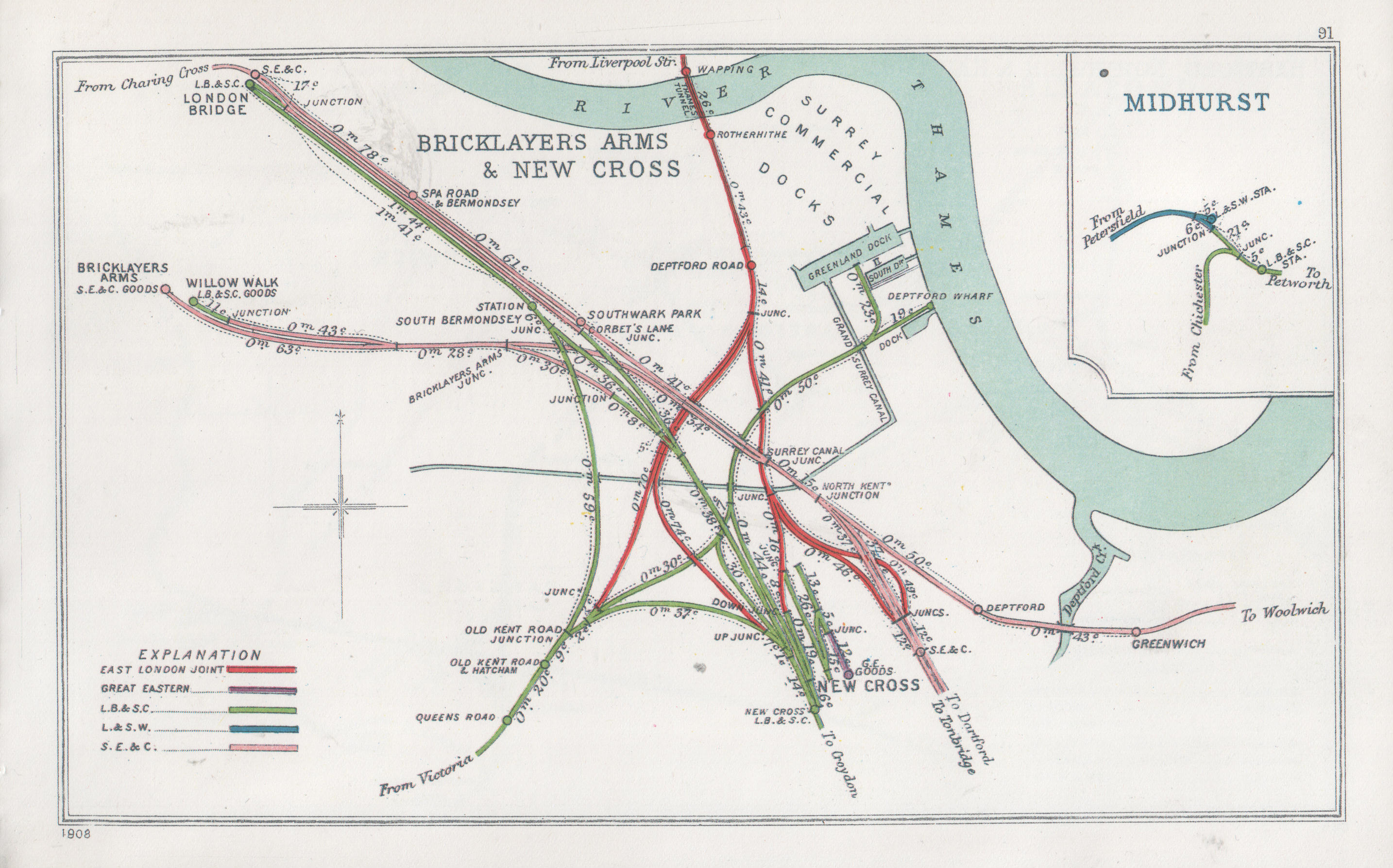
A 1908 Railway Clearing House map of lines around the approaches to London Bridge

The station was constructed on a section of extra wide arches running from 168 yards (154 m) west of Rotherhithe New Road to 680 yards (620 m) east of the road. Two loop lines ran through the station, which was controlled by the Corbetts Lane Signal Cabin (later renamed Southwark Park Station Signal Cabin). Passengers boarded trains from two island platforms, reached from ground level via ramped approaches. Each platform was 170 yards (160 m) long, with waiting rooms and a roof 220 feet (67 m) long. A booking hall and station offices stood at ground level.

The station did not attract much traffic, as an electric tramway ran nearby and was more popular with travellers. Along with Spa Road and Deptford stations, Southwark Park station closed on 15 March 1915 due to wartime economies. It did not reopen due to competition from other public transport making it uneconomic to operate. The station continued to be used by railway staff until 21 September 1925. The bricked-up remains of the ticket hall are visible from the outside in Corbetts Lane. The abandoned interior of the ticket hall and foundations for the platforms were uncovered by Network Rail in March 2015 as part of Thameslink Programme upgrade.

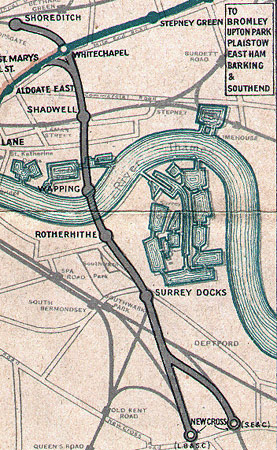
A 1915 map showing the location of the station (just west of Surrey Docks station)

British Rail did consider reopening the station as part of Thameslink in the 1980s but this never materialised.

Preceding station	Historical railways	Following station
Spa Road	South Eastern and Chatham Railway Greenwich Line	Deptford
