= The Battle of Maze Hill =

Violent clash between football hooligans in London, 2002

The Battle of Maze Hill was the name given to a violent clash between Charlton Athletic F.C. and Southampton F.C. football hooligans which took place at Maze Hill railway station, south-east London, on 13 April 2002. The resulting investigation into the clash was one of the largest ever investigations into football hooliganism in England.

The clash was masterminded by a 37-year-old teacher, Dave Walker, from Birmingham. Bolton Wanderers, Tranmere Rovers, Liverpool F.C. and Port Vale fans were also involved in its organisation. This was therefore not a spontaneous clash between rival fans, but a prearranged fight carried out by organised football hooligans. The Metropolitan Police believed that the group who orchestrated the brawl (convicted in 2004) were also planning trouble for the imminent European Championships, which England were involved in. The Battle was primarily organised over the internet.

In the event, approximately forty hooligans clashed at the station. The mass fight only lasted two minutes but involved weapons such as beer bottles and resulted in the hospitalisation of three men. The Southampton hooligans came off worse since there were around twice as many Charlton Athletic supporters waiting for them at the station. The Charlton fans were also mostly older, experienced thugs while those from Southampton were mostly in their early twenties. Maze Hill railway station was selected as the location as it is two train stops from Charlton and lacked a police presence.

After the fight, hooligans from both sides contributed to internet forums expressing admiration and respect for each other.

In the resulting police investigation, 17 men were imprisoned for a total of 38 years.
