= Maze Hill railway station =

National Rail station in London, England

Maze Hill
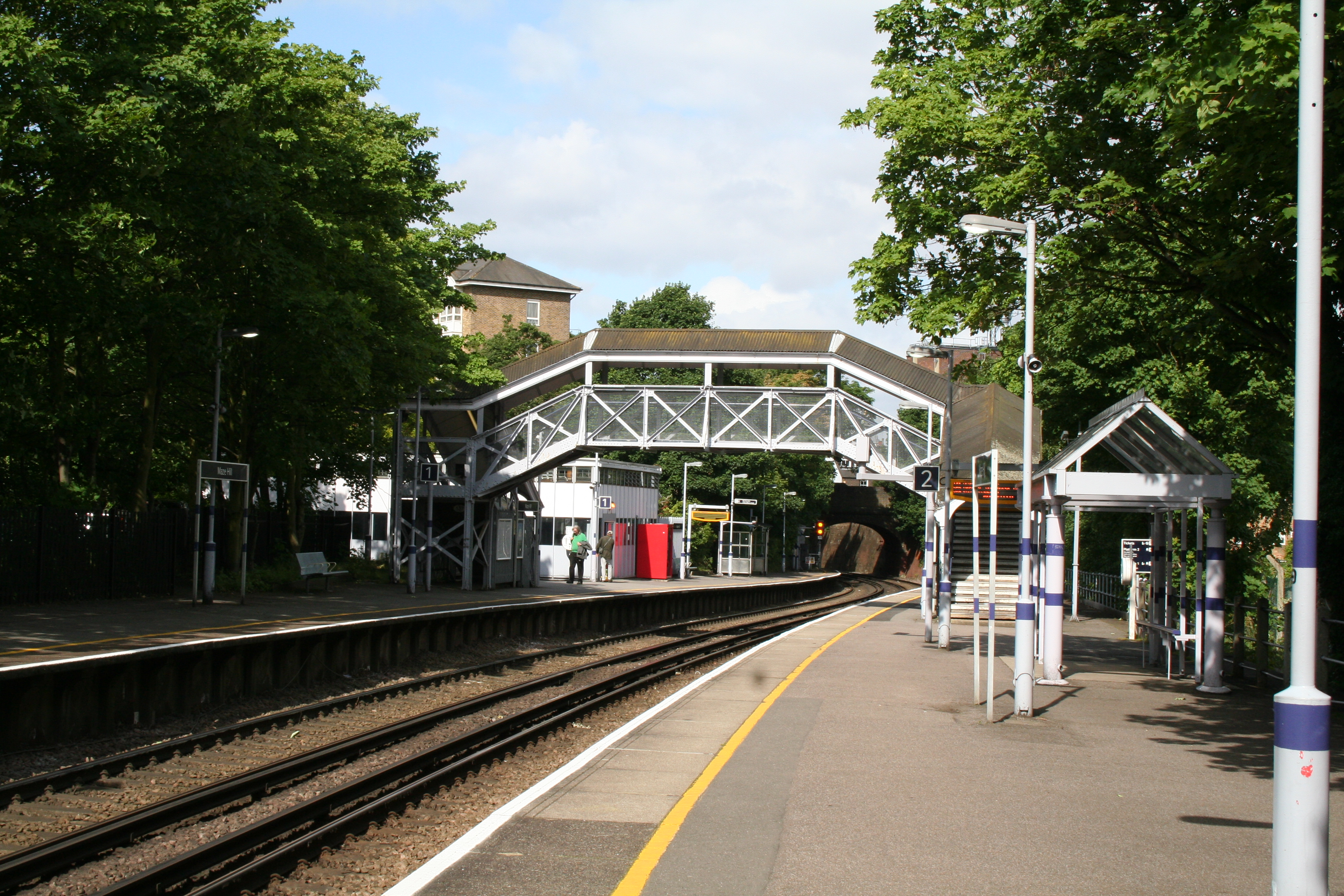
- Interactive map of Maze Hill

General information
- Location: Maze Hill
- Local authority: Greenwich
- Managed by: Southeastern
- Station code: MZH
- DfT category: D
- Number of platforms: 2
- Accessible: Yes
- Fare zone: 3

National Rail annual entry and exit
- 2021–22: ▲0.860 million
- 2022–23: ▲1.166 million
- 2023–24: ▲1.249 million
- 2024–25: ▲1.398 million
- 2025–26: ▲1.676 million

Key dates
- 1 January 1873: Opened as Greenwich (Maze Hill) – terminus station
- 1 February 1878: renamed Maze Hill & East Greenwich and became through station

Other information
- External links: Departures; Facilities
- Coordinates: 51.4826°N 0.0030°E

Maze Hill railway station is in Greenwich, London, and is situated on the Greenwich Line connecting suburbs (e.g.: Deptford, Greenwich, Charlton, Woolwich, to Dartford, Kent) along the south side of the River Thames with central London stations (London Bridge, Cannon Street and Charing Cross). The station is in the Maze Hill area of Greenwich, and is the closest station to Greenwich Park, being about 150m east of the north-east corner of the park. It is 4 miles 38 chains (7.2 km) down the line from London Bridge.

== History ==
Maze Hill station opened in 1873 by the South Eastern Railway (SER) and for five years functioned as a terminus on a line linked to the North Kent Line just west of Charlton. On 1 February 1878 a cut-and-cover tunnel link between Greenwich and Maze Hill was opened, completing a through line from the original London & Greenwich Railway to the North Kent Line.

In 1899 the SER handed over its operations to a new organisation co-owned with the London, Chatham & Dover Railway (LCDR), which traded as the South Eastern & Chatham Railway (SECR); the line and station continued to be owned and maintained by the SER.

In the 1923 Grouping, the SER and LCDR amalgamated with other railways to form the Southern Railway (SR). Three years later in 1926 the line through Maze Hill was electrified using the 750 V DC third rail system. A limited electric service started on 10 May with a full electric service being operated from 19 July.

In 1948 following nationalisation the station became part of the Southern Region of British Railways.

On 4 July 1958 there was a collision between two trains at Maze Hill. The 09.41 electric passenger train from Gravesend Central to Charing Cross ran past the Up Home signal at danger and collided head-on with a nine-coach empty steam passenger stock train which was being shunted slowly from the Up Sidings across the Up line towards the Down line. The accident occurred as the empty train was entering the crossover leading from the Up to the Down line. The passenger train was approaching the station at about 40 mph when the motorman (driver), who had failed to observe the home signal, saw the obstruction ahead and applied the brakes. His action was too late to be effective and the collision occurred at a speed of about 25 mph. Forty-three people were injured although none seriously.

Following a fire, the station was rebuilt with a glass-walled booking hall as a prototype for the rebuilding of similar Southern suburban stations. The new building was opened by the Mayor of Greenwich on 14 July 1972.

In 1982 following the establishment of three passenger business sectors, Maze Hill was part of the London & South Eastern business sector which became Network SouthEast in 1986. Following the privatisation of British Rail in 1994 operation of the infrastructure became the responsibility of Railtrack, whilst passenger services were operated by Connex South Eastern. In 2003 the Strategic Rail Authority terminated the Connex franchise and for the next three years the train service was run by a state owned company South Eastern Trains. Operation then transferred to Southeastern on 1 April 2006. Following financial problems Network Rail took over operation of the infrastructure in 2002.

In April 2002 the station was the scene of a fight between Charlton Athletic and Southampton football hooligans that became known as The Battle of Maze Hill.

== Location ==
The station lies at the eastern end of a tunnel underneath the grounds of the National Maritime Museum – itself only a 5- to 10-minute walk away through the park.

The station allows passengers to board west-bound trains to Greenwich and Deptford and then on to central London, and east-bound trains towards Dartford and north Kent.

== Services ==
Services at Maze Hill are operated by Southeastern and Thameslink using Class 376, 465, 466, 700 and 707 EMUs.

The typical off-peak service in trains per hour is:

- 2 tph to London Cannon Street
- 2 tph to Luton
- 2 tph to Barnehurst, returning to London Cannon Street via Bexleyheath and Lewisham
- 2 tph to Rainham via Chatham

Additional services, including trains to and from London Cannon Street via Sidcup call at the station during peak hours.

Preceding station	National Rail	Following station
Greenwich	Thameslink Greenwich Line	Westcombe Park
Greenwich	Southeastern Greenwich Line	Westcombe Park

== Connections ==
London Buses routes 129, 177, 188, 286, 386 and night route N1 serve the station, running along Trafalgar Road, approximately 100m north of the station.
