= Charlton railway station =

National Rail station in London, England

Charlton
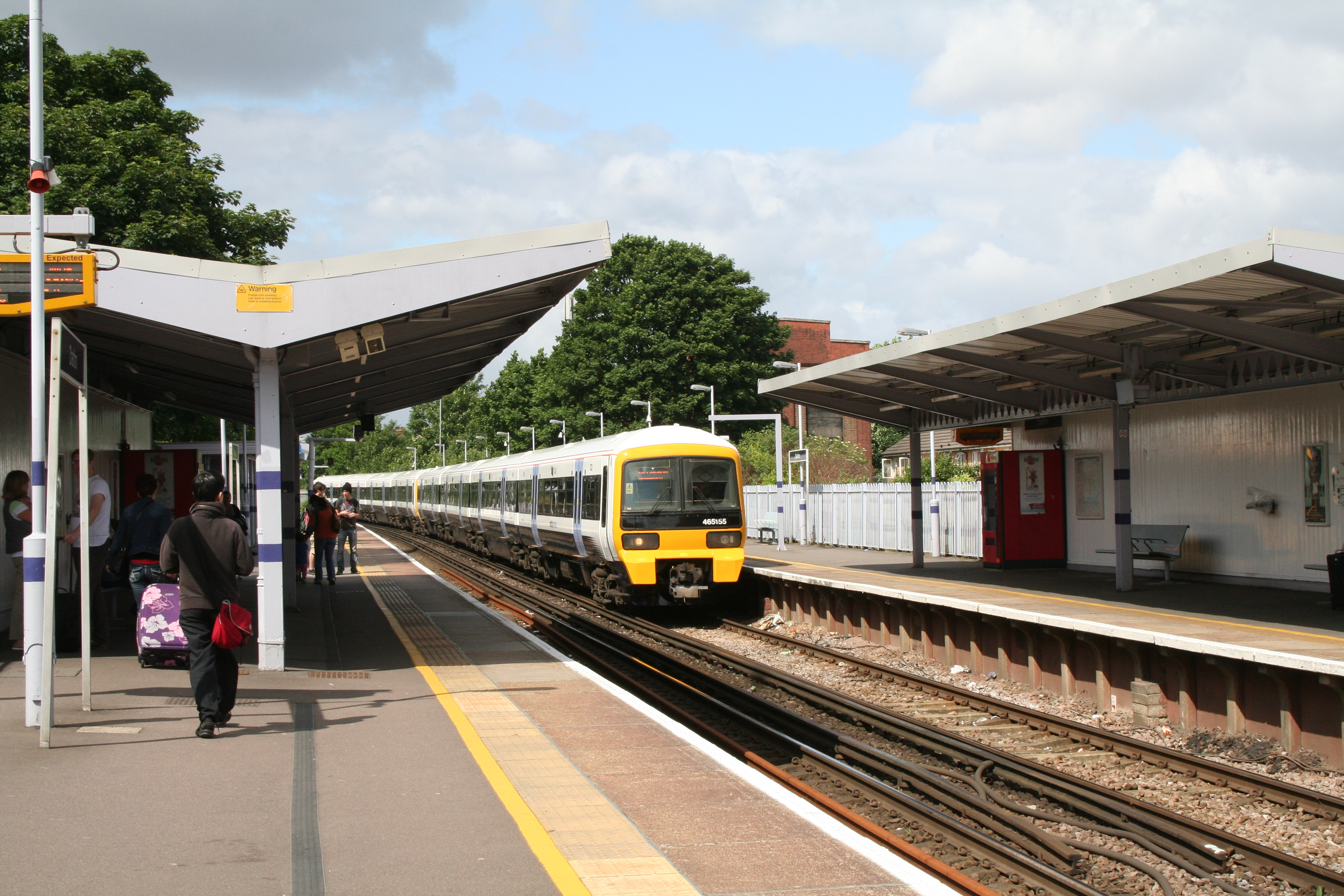
- Interactive map of Charlton

General information
- Location: Charlton
- Local authority: Royal Borough of Greenwich
- Managed by: Southeastern
- Station code: CTN
- DfT category: D
- Number of platforms: 2 (originally 3)
- Accessible: Yes
- Fare zone: 3

National Rail annual entry and exit
- 2020–21: ▼0.460 million
- Interchange: ▼19,576
- 2021–22: ▲1.073 million
- Interchange: ▲40,647
- 2022–23: ▲1.169 million
- Interchange: ▲50,945
- 2023–24: ▲1.173 million
- Interchange: ▼28,059
- 2024–25: ▲1.269 million
- Interchange: ▼20,420

Key dates
- 30 July 1849: Opened

Other information
- External links: Departures; Facilities
- Coordinates: 51.48686°N 0.03232°E

Charlton railway station is a railway station in Charlton, Royal Borough of Greenwich. It is 7 miles 44 chains (12.2 km) measured from Charing Cross. The station is operated by Southeastern. Trains serving the station are operated by Southeastern and Thameslink. It is in London fare zone 3.

Charlton station is within walking distance of The Valley, home of Charlton Athletic F.C. It was first opened in 1849 by the South Eastern Railway on the North Kent Line and is close to the junction where the routes via Greenwich and Lewisham converge (the link from Greenwich and Maze Hill being completed in 1878).

== Services ==
Services at Charlton are operated by Southeastern and Thameslink using Class 376, 465, 466, 700 and 707 EMUs.

The typical off-peak service in trains per hour is:

- 4 tph to London Cannon Street (2 of these run via Greenwich and 2 run via Lewisham)
- 2 tph to Luton via Greenwich
- 2 tph to Barnehurst, returning to London Cannon Street via Bexleyheath and Lewisham
- 2 tph to Dartford
- 2 tph to Rainham via Chatham

Additional services, including trains to and from London Cannon Street via Sidcup call at the station during the peak hours.

Preceding station	National Rail	Following station
Westcombe Park	Thameslink Greenwich Line	Woolwich Arsenal
Westcombe Park	Southeastern Greenwich Line	Woolwich Dockyard
Blackheath	Southeastern North Kent Line	Woolwich Dockyard

== Connections ==
London Buses routes 161, 177, 180, 486 and night routes N1 and N472 serve the station.
