= Deptford railway station =

National Rail station in London, England

Deptford
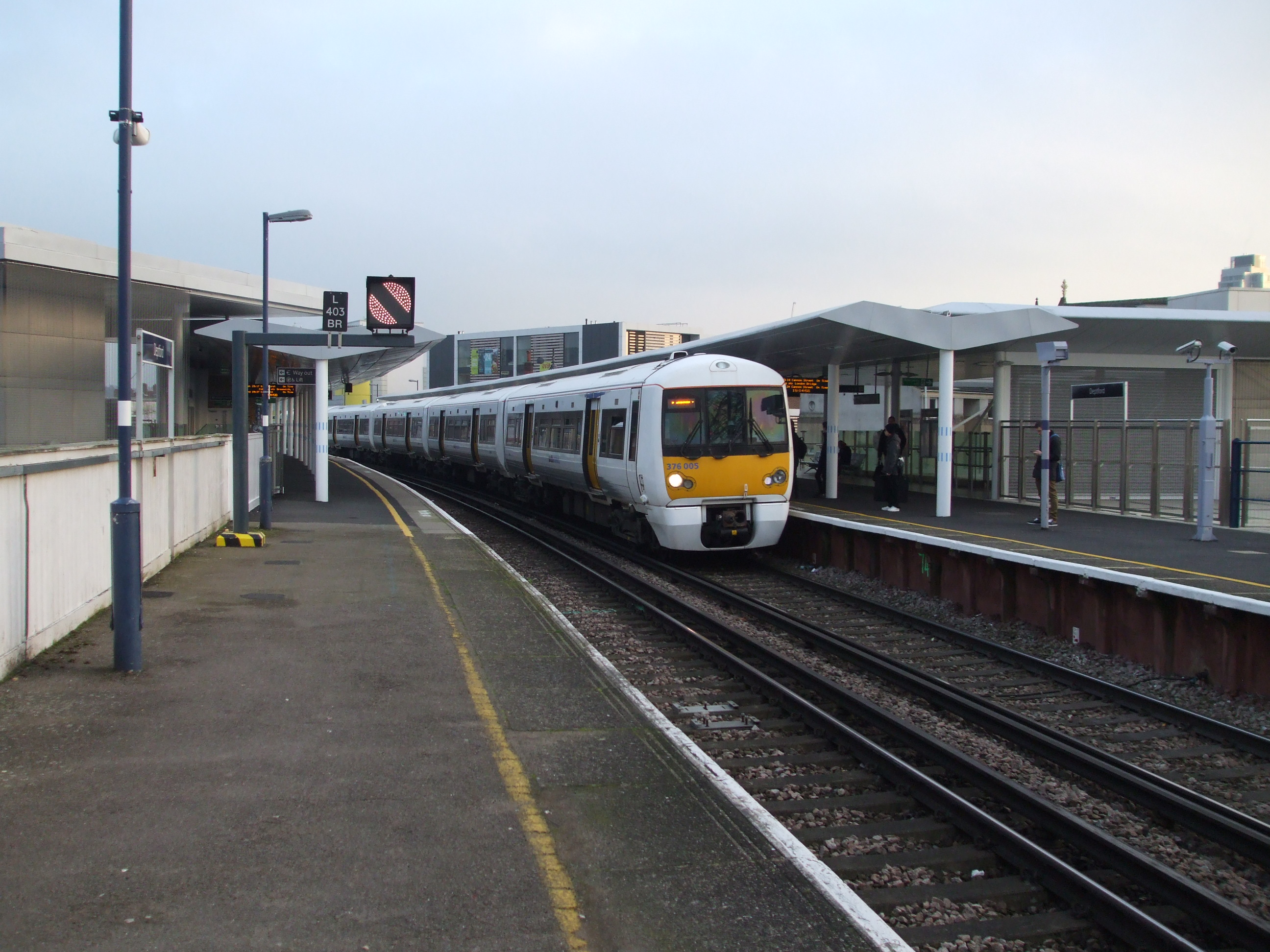
- Interactive map of Deptford

General information
- Location: Deptford
- Local authority: London Borough of Lewisham
- Managed by: Southeastern
- Station code: DEP
- DfT category: E
- Number of platforms: 2
- Accessible: Yes
- Fare zone: 2

National Rail annual entry and exit
- 2020–21: ▼0.614 million
- 2021–22: ▲1.240 million
- 2022–23: ▲1.476 million
- 2023–24: ▼1.413 million
- 2024–25: ▲1.644 million

Key dates
- 8 February 1836: Opening of temporary station
- 24 December 1838: New station building constructed
- 15 March 1915: Closed
- 19 July 1926: Reopened
- 26 April 2012: New station building constructed

Other information
- External links: Departures; Facilities
- Coordinates: 51.4788°N 0.0265°W

Deptford is a National Rail station in Deptford in London, England. It is on the Greenwich line, 3 miles 7 chains (5.0 km) down the line from London Bridge, and has staggered platforms on the London Bridge – Greenwich Railway Viaduct, a high brick viaduct on which the line runs at this point above Deptford High Street.

It is in London fare zone 2.

== History ==
The station sign of Deptford railway station with a small exhibit outlining its history

Opened in 1836, Deptford station is the oldest railway station in London that is still in use. It came into existence when the London and Greenwich Railway opened its first section between Spa Road, Bermondsey, and Deptford on 8 February 1836, with an intermediate station at Southwark Park. The line was extended westwards to the new London Bridge Station on 14 December 1836 and eastwards to Greenwich on 24 December 1838.

Deptford station was closed between 1915 and 1926. The original station building was demolished by the Southern Railway and replaced by a newer building, which was demolished around 2011.

The replacement building was opened on Thursday 26 April 2012; this rebuild has made the station fully accessible. A second entry/exit is now open since the refurbishment of the old carriage ramp is now complete; this new entrance is located on Platform 1. There are two ticket machines in the station, one in the ticket hall and the other next to the carriage ramp entrance on Platform 1.

== Services ==
Services at Deptford are operated by Southeastern and Thameslink using Class 376, 465, 466, 700 and 707 EMUs.

The typical off-peak service in trains per hour is:

- 2 tph to London Cannon Street
- 2 tph to Luton
- 2 tph to Barnehurst, returning to London Cannon Street via Bexleyheath and Lewisham
- 2 tph to Rainham via Chatham

Additional services, including trains to and from London Cannon Street via Sidcup call at the station during the peak hours.

| Preceding station | National Rail | Following station |
|---|---|---|
| London Bridge | Thameslink Greenwich Line | Greenwich |
| London Bridge | Southeastern Greenwich Line | Greenwich |
| | Historical railways | |
| Southwark Park | South Eastern and Chatham Railway Greenwich Line | Greenwich |
