= London and Greenwich Railway =

UK railway line

The London and Greenwich Railway (L&GR) was opened in London between 1836 and 1838. It was the first steam railway in the capital, the first to be built specifically for passengers, and the first entirely elevated railway.

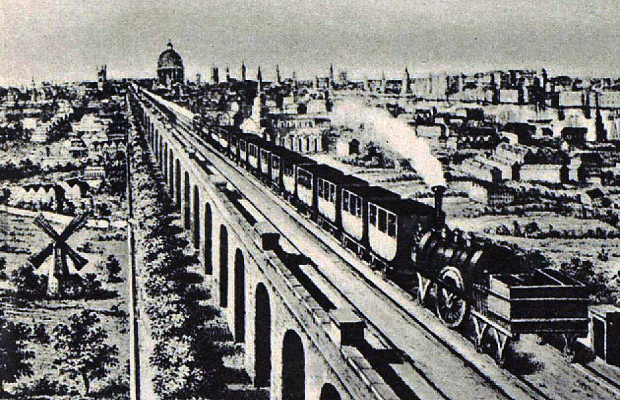
The London & Greenwich Railway, 1837

== Origins ==
The idea for the line came from Colonel George Thomas Landmann, until 1824 a Royal Engineer, and George Walter, and the company was floated at a meeting on 25 November 1831. It would run from close to London Bridge, convenient for journeys to the City. It would be some 3 3/4 miles (6.0 km) long, on a viaduct of 878 brick arches, some of them skew (see London Bridge-Greenwich Railway Viaduct), to avoid level crossings over the many streets which were already appearing in the south of London. Landmann planned to rent the arches out as workshops. The intention had been to descend to ground level after the Grand Surrey Canal but this was opposed by Parliament.

London and Greenwich Railway Act 1833
- Act of Parliament
- Parliament of the United Kingdom
- Long title: An Act for making a Railway from London to Greenwich.
- Citation: 3 & 4 Will. 4. c. xlvi

Dates
- Royal assent: 17 May 1833

Text of statute as originally enacted

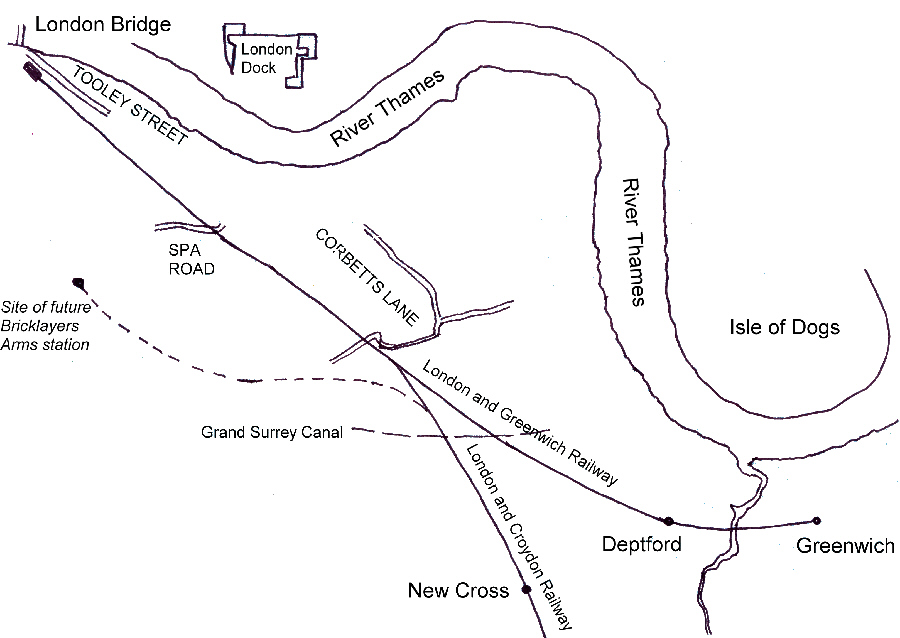
Railways in South-east London in 1840

The first act of Parliament, the London and Greenwich Railway Act 1833 (3 & 4 Will. 4. c. xlvi) was obtained for a line from Tooley Street (now London Bridge) to London Street, Greenwich.

The ultimate intention was to reach Dover and there was much talk of a London to Gravesend extension from Greenwich. A scheme was presented to Parliament in 1836 but five others were competing and the bill failed on its second reading.

== Construction ==
The line ran parallel with Tooley Street, crossing Blue Anchor Road, Corbetts Lane and the Grand Surrey Canal. From there it curved towards the first station, at Deptford High Street, and thence to Greenwich. The contractor was Hugh McIntosh. As planned, the final length was 3 3/4 miles.

The subsoil was a blackish peat, which gave considerable problems, and Landmann pioneered the use of concrete to reinforce the foundations. Even so, several of the piers near to Corbetts Lane moved four or five inches (100 - 125 mm) out of the perpendicular and on 18 January 1836 two arches close to Tooley Street collapsed. Elsewhere, iron ties were used to prevent lateral spread in the brickwork. In 1840 many of the arches were improved by laying 9 inches (230 mm) of concrete above them, with a layer of asphalt.

Between Deptford and Greenwich the River Ravensbourne was crossed at Deptford Creek by a balanced bridge to allow masted vessels to pass. Eight men operated it, but possibly because of trouble with the foundations it was unreliable. It was replaced in 1884 and again in 1963.

Originally the line had single parallel tracks of Stephenson gauge 4 ft 8 1/2 in (1,435 mm), fixed to stone blocks or sleepers. By 1840 there was a mixture of bridge rails, single parallel and double parallel rails (see Rail profile). The original rails caused excessive noise, and damage to structure and rolling stock. Bridge rails were used on the viaduct between Deptford and Greenwich initially, laid on longitudinal timbers with cross sleepers at four-foot intervals. At this time, new double parallel rails of 78 lb. to the yard were laid for a quarter of mile (400 m) at Deptford on timber sleepers, presumably as an experiment. The concrete underlay was replaced with gravel ballast of 2 feet (610 mm) thickness.

== Opening ==
The first section, between Spa Road and Deptford, opened on 8 February 1836: demonstration trains had been running from mid-1835 including Corbett's Lane Temp Station. These were suspended for a while after a derailment in November, but resumed the following year, with rumours circulating that trains had reached 60 miles per hour (97 km/h). On the Whit Monday following the official opening, the line carried around 13,000 passengers. There was a fatal accident on 7 March, when Daniel Holmes was run over and a train collided with some carriages.

In 1837, The Gentleman's Magazine celebrated the railway project saying:

"This great national work reflects the highest honour on the gallant proprietor, Colonel Landmann, no less credit on the contractor, Mr Macintosh, under whose orders no less than 60,000,000 bricks have been laid by human hands since the Royal assent was given to the Act of Parliament for its formation in 1833."

The line reached Bermondsey Street in October, and London Bridge on 14 December 1836 (Spa Road was no longer used as a stop at this time). At the other end, the line reached a temporary station at Church Row in Greenwich on 24 December 1838, having been delayed by problems with the Deptford Creek lift bridge. The present Greenwich station opened on 12 April 1840.

== Rolling stock ==
The first locomotives were one 2-2-0 built by Charles Tayleur and Company and three by William Marshall of Gravesend, of which one was 2-2-2. All would appear to be of the Stephenson "Planet" type. These were supplemented by two from Bury, subcontracted to George Forrester and Company. For the first time horizontal cylinders were mounted at the front of the locomotive outside the frame. While extremely successful for their time, they swayed so much they were referred to as "Boxers" and a trailing axle was added. In the next four years three more locos followed, one each by R and W Hawthorn and Robert Stephenson and Company, with three axles, and one by Day, Summers and Company. This latter one was modified with a trailing axle soon after delivery.

Of the four locomotives built by Marshall, the first was named Royal William. One of the other three was numbered 4 and carried the name Twells, after John Twells, a director of the London and Greenwich Railway. Built in 1836, it was rated at 25 horsepower (19 kW). In 1845, it was sold to the Admiralty and was installed in HMS Erebus, which was lost in 1848 during the search for the Northwest Passage.

First and second class coaches were unusual in that the sole bars and headstocks were below the axles. The line being for much of its length on a viaduct, this was a safety measure, since in a derailment the coaches would drop only a few inches onto the rails.

== Later history ==
London and Greenwich Railway Act 1837
- Act of Parliament
- Parliament of the United Kingdom
- Long title: An Act to enlarge the Powers of an Act passed in the Third Year of the Reign of His present Majesty, intituled "An Act for making a Railway from London to Greenwich."
- Citation: 7 Will. 4 & 1 Vict. c. l

Dates
- Royal assent: 8 June 1837

London and Greenwich Railway Act 1838
- Act of Parliament
- Parliament of the United Kingdom
- Long title: An Act for extending the Time for completing the London and Greenwich Railway.
- Citation: 1 & 2 Vict. c. iv

Dates
- Royal assent: 11 April 1838

Text of statute as originally enacted

London and Greenwich Railway Act 1839
- Act of Parliament
- Parliament of the United Kingdom
- Long title: An Act for granting further Powers to the London and Greenwich Railway Company.
- Citation: 2 & 3 Vict. c. xix

Dates
- Royal assent: 4 June 1839

Text of statute as originally enacted

Between 1836 and 1840 the line carried more than 1.25 million passengers a year, benefiting it is thought from a developing tourist trade.

On 5 June 1839 the London and Croydon Railway (L&CR) opened. It shared the line between Tooley Street and Corbetts Lane (close to what is now Rotherhithe Road) and its station was built between the L&GR station and Tooley Street. It is not clear when the station became known as London Bridge.

It is believed that at Corbetts Lane there was installed the first fixed signal used to control a junction, a white disc operated by the pointsman. This, or at night a red light, showed that the route was set for Croydon. If the disc was edge on or a white light showed, the junction was set for Greenwich.

London and Greenwich Railway Act 1840
- Act of Parliament
- Parliament of the United Kingdom
- Long title: An Act to amend and enlarge the Powers and London and Provisions of the several Acts relating to the London and Greenwich Railway.
- Citation: 3 & 4 Vict. c. cxxvii

Dates
- Royal assent: 7 August 1840

Text of statute as originally enacted

London and Greenwich Railway (Southwark Station) Act 1840
- Act of Parliament
- Parliament of the United Kingdom
- Long title: An Act to enable the London and Greenwich Railway Company to provide a Station in the Parish of Saint Olave, in the Borough of Southwark, and County of Surrey.
- Citation: 3 & 4 Vict. c. cxxviii

Dates
- Royal assent: 7 August 1840

In 1840 two further acts were obtained, the London and Greenwich Railway Act 1840 (3 & 4 Vict. c. cxxvii) for laying additional lines as far as the junction at Corbetts Lane and the London and Greenwich Railway (Southwark Station) Act 1840 (3 & 4 Vict. c. cxxviii) for improvements and extensions to the stations at London Bridge. These were watched closely by a committee formed by the L&CR, the London and Brighton Railway (L&BR) and the proposed South Eastern Railway (SER). At this time the L&GR and the L&CR exchanged stations to avoid crossing each other at Corbetts Lane. A resited station at Spa Road opened in 1842.

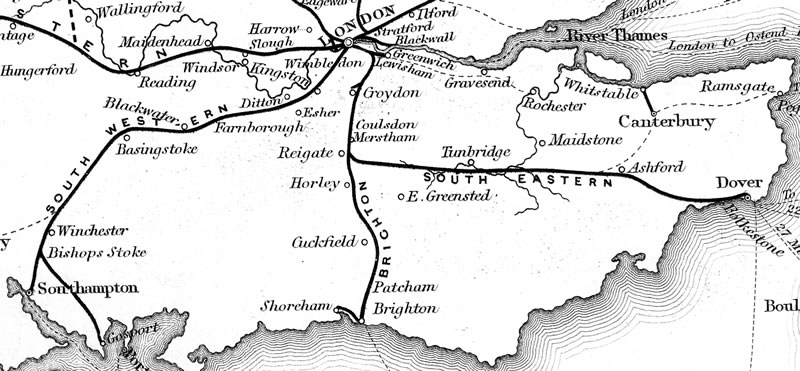
Railways in the South East of England in 1840

By 1843 annual passenger numbers had risen to more than 1.5 million, with an average fare per head of 6½d. In 1844 numbers had risen to more than two million although the average fare had dropped to 5s 2d. Greenwich trains ran every 15 minutes, Croydon trains hourly. The company was never financially successful, however, owing to the need to repay the very high capital expenditure in building the line.

London and Greenwich Railway Act 1842
- Act of Parliament
- Parliament of Great Britain
- Long title: An Act for amending some of the Powers of the Acts relating to the London and Greenwich Railway.
- Citation: 5 & 6 Vict. c. cii

Dates
- Royal assent: 16 July 1842

Text of statute as originally enacted

London and Greenwich Railway Act 1845
- Act of Parliament
- Parliament of the United Kingdom
- Long title: An Act to authorize the London and Greenwich Railway Company to let on Lease the London and Greenwich Railway, and for amending the Acts relating to such Railway.
- Citation: 8 & 9 Vict. c. lxxx

Dates
- Royal assent: 21 July 1845

The increasing congestion of the lines approaching London Bridge and dissatisfaction with the high tolls charged by the L&GR caused the SER and the L&CR to build a new terminus at Bricklayers Arms. It opened in 1844, transferring most of their services and reducing their fares accordingly. This reduction in toll revenues brought the company to the brink of bankruptcy. Prior to the opening of Bricklayers Arms it had approached the SER with a suggestion that they should either buy or lease the L&GR. The SER took some time to respond and in the meanwhile the company received a similar offer from the L&BR and also negotiated reduced tolls with the L&CR. Eventually the SER agreed to lease the L&GR from 1 January 1845, and this was approved by the London and Greenwich Railway Act 1845 (8 & 9 Vict. c. lxxx).

The L&GR continued in existence until January 1923 but its activities were restricted to receiving the annual rent from the SER and distributing it to shareholders.

== Greenwich ==
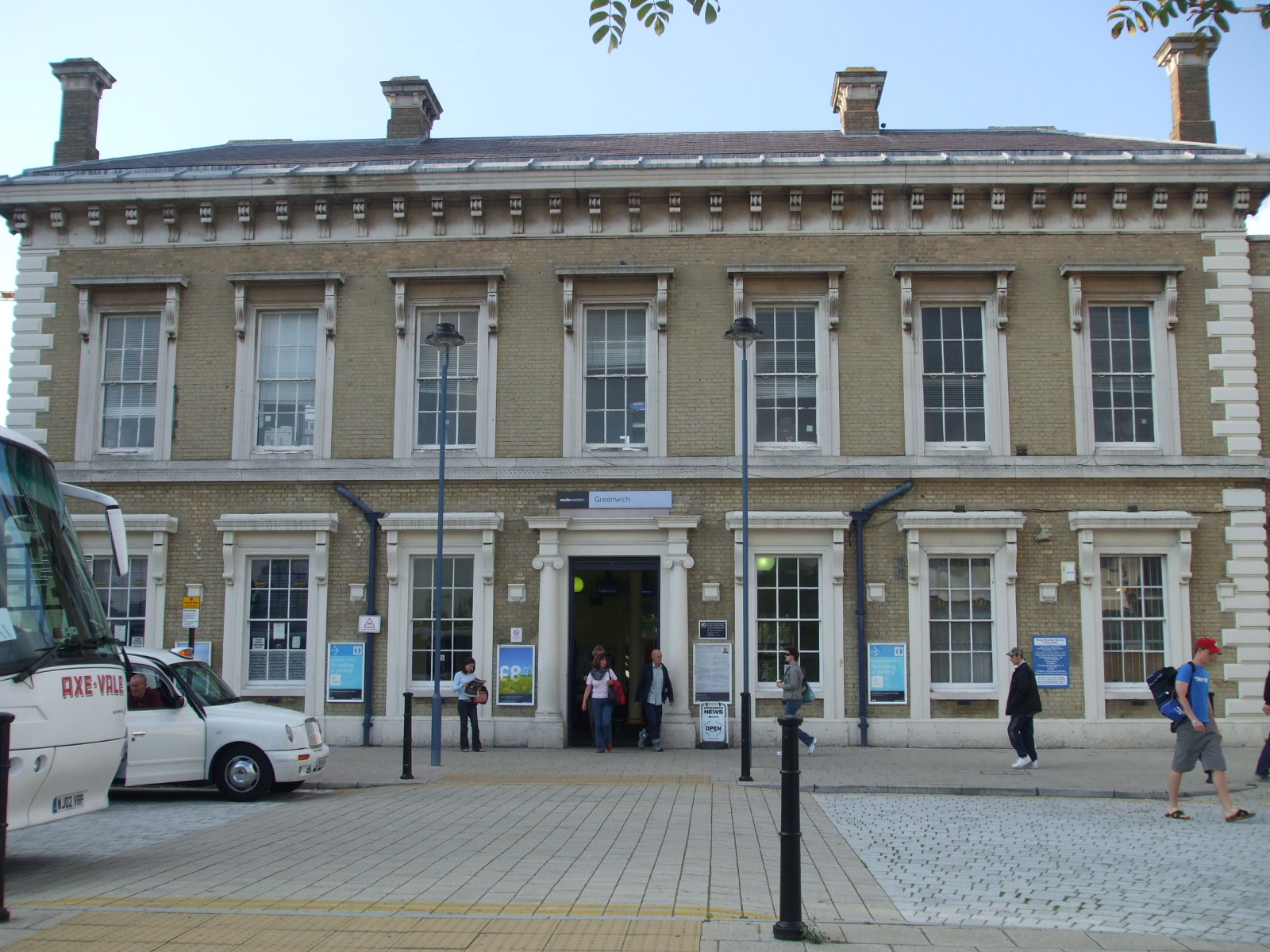
Greenwich station

Greenwich was the terminus until 1878, when the cut-and-cover tunnel to Maze Hill was opened by the SER, linking it to the North Kent Line just west of Charlton. This ran beneath the grounds of the Queen's House and Greenwich Hospital, where the graveyard was excavated, remains being reinterred in East Greenwich Pleasaunce approximately 1 mile (1.61 km) to the east. The section between Charlton and Maze Hill opened in 1873, with Maze Hill the terminus until 1878. Westcombe Park railway station opened in 1879.

The layout of Greenwich station still partly shows that fact. The line from London, on a continuous viaduct, was almost straight, but after Greenwich it makes a sharp turn and dips into a tunnel. A space between the two tracks, for the locomotive 'escape route' to reverse the trains, disappeared in the 1990s when the station was altered to accommodate an extension to the Docklands Light Railway.

== See also ==
- Greenwich line
