= Greenwich station =

Docklands Light Railway and National Rail station

Greenwich
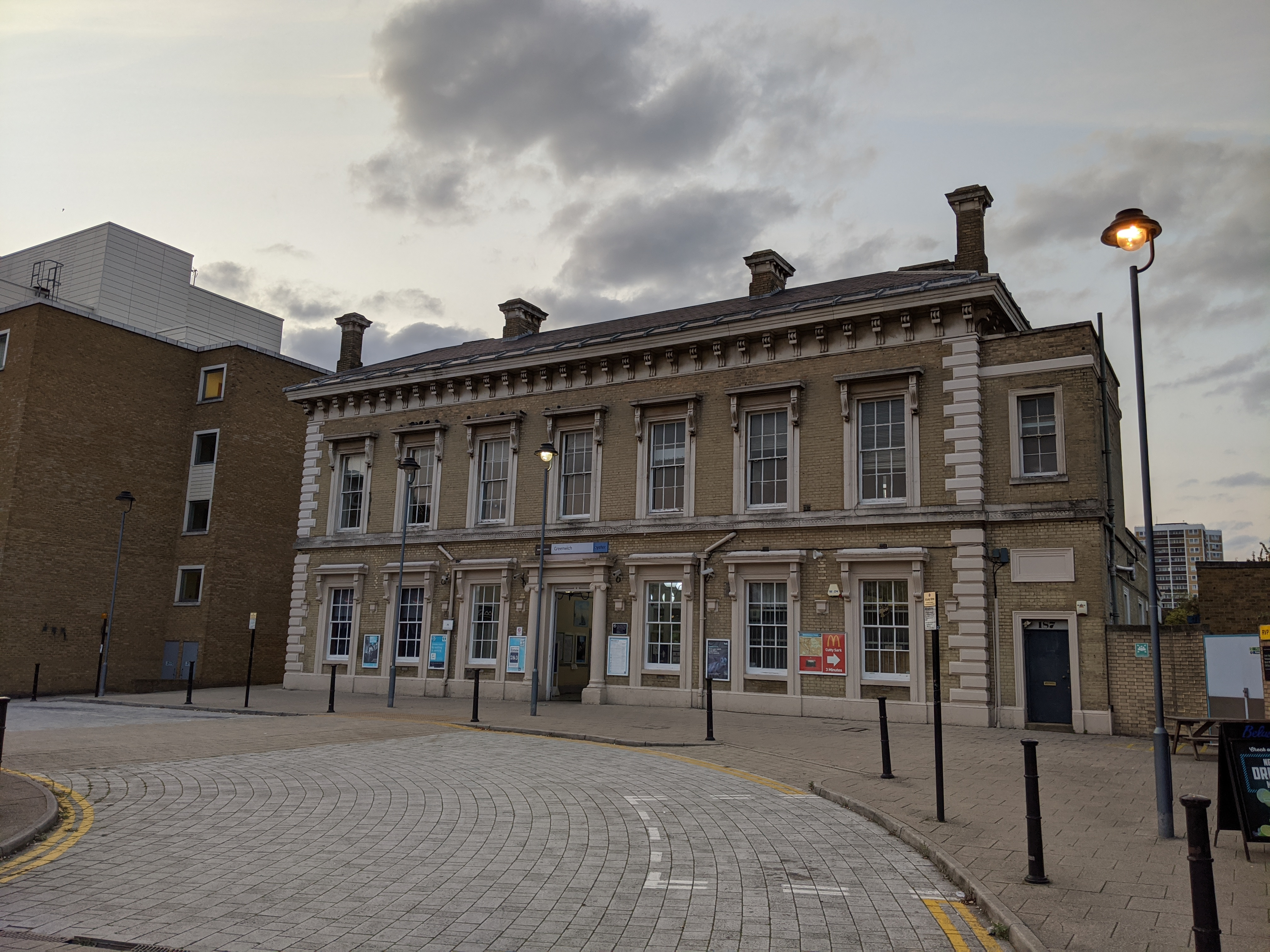
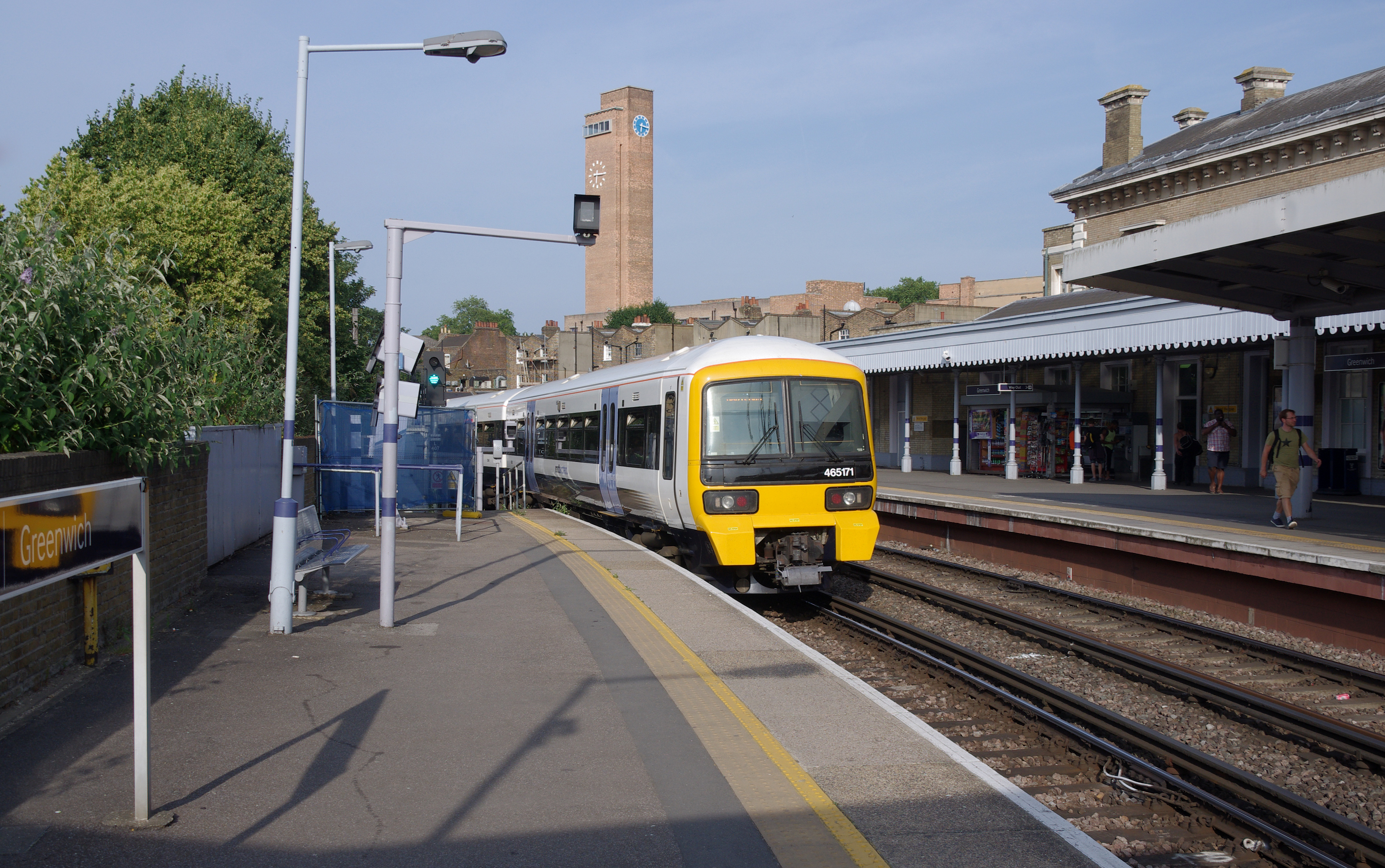
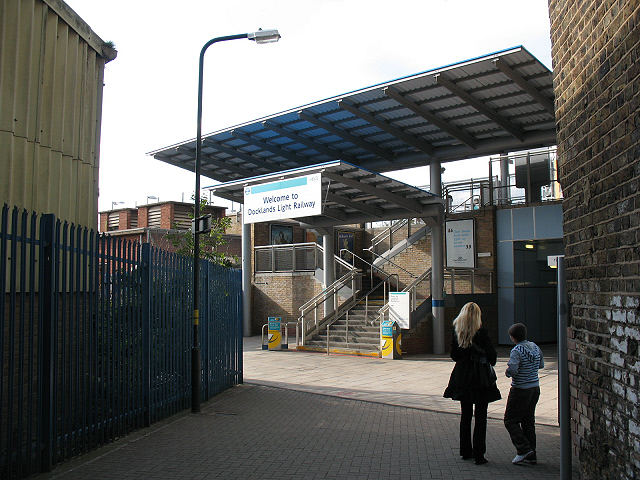
- Main entrance, Grade II listed National Rail platforms DLR entrance
- Interactive map of Greenwich

General information
- Location: Greenwich
- Local authority: Royal Borough of Greenwich
- Managed by: Southeastern; Docklands Light Railway
- Owners: Network Rail; Transport for London
- Station code: GNW
- DfT category: D
- Number of platforms: 4
- Accessible: Yes
- Fare zone: 2 and 3

DLR annual boardings and alightings
- 2021: ▲2.725 million
- 2022: ▲4.830 million
- 2023: ▲5.330 million
- 2024: ▲7.12 million
- 2025: ▲14.87 million

National Rail annual entry and exit
- 2020–21: ▼0.867 million
- 2021–22: ▲2.061 million
- 2022–23: ▲2.367 million
- 2023–24: ▼2.140 million
- 2024–25: ▲2.439 million

Key dates
- 24 December 1838: Opened
- 12 April 1840: Resited
- 11 January 1878: Resited
- 20 November 1999: DLR extension

Other information
- External links: Departures; Facilities
- Coordinates: 51.4781°N 0.014°W

Designations

Listed Building – Grade II
- Official name: Greenwich Station (Incorporating No. 187)
- Designated: 8 June 1973; 53 years ago
- Reference no.: 1290851

Greenwich station is about 400 metres (1,300 feet) south-west of Greenwich's historical centre, in London, England. It is an interchange between the National Rail and the Docklands Light Railway (DLR). It is in London fare zone 2 and 3.

The station is served by the northwestern-bound Southeastern services towards Cannon Street (Note: Interchange with the Circle and District lines as well as National Rail services.) via London Bridge (Note: Interchange with the Jubilee and Northern lines as well as National Rail services.) and Thameslink services towards Luton via London Bridge and Farringdon (Note: Interchange with the Circle, Metropolitan and Hammersmith & City lines, the Elizabeth line as well as National Rail services.). It is also served by the southeastern-bound Southeastern services towards Slade Green and Thameslink services towards Rainham (Kent). The Docklands Light Railway serves this station, with southbound services towards Lewisham (Note: Interchange with National Rail services towards London Charing Cross and Cannon Street via London Bridge, and London Victoria.) and northbound services towards Bank (Note: Interchange with the Central, Waterloo & City and Northern lines, as well as the Circle and District lines at Monument.) and Stratford (Note: Interchange with the Jubilee and Central lines, the Elizabeth line and the Mildmay line, as well as National Rail services from Stratford International such as High Speed 1.) via Canary Wharf (Note: Interchange with the Jubilee line and the Elizabeth line.).

It is the nearest National Rail station to the centre of Greenwich, but Cutty Sark for Maritime Greenwich DLR station is closer to the town centre and its tourist attractions. East of the station the Dartford line goes through a tunnel underneath the grounds of the National Maritime Museum, towards Maze Hill. Northwards, the DLR goes into a tunnel through Cutty Sark station and under the River Thames to the Isle of Dogs; in the opposite direction, it rises on a concrete viaduct to follow the River Ravensbourne upstream to Deptford Bridge and Lewisham.

On the National Rail network, Greenwich is 3 miles 47 chains (5.8 km) measured from London Bridge.

== Services ==
=== National Rail ===
National Rail services at Greenwich are operated by Southeastern and Thameslink using Class 376, 465, 466, 700 and 707 EMUs.

The typical off-peak service in trains per hour is:

- 2 tph to London Cannon Street
- 2 tph to Luton
- 2 tph to Barnehurst, returning to London Cannon Street via Bexleyheath and Lewisham
- 2 tph to Rainham via Chatham

Additional services, including trains to and from London Cannon Street via Sidcup call at the station during the peak hours.

=== DLR ===
The typical off-peak DLR service in trains per hour from Greenwich is:

- 12 tph to Bank
- 12 tph to Lewisham

Additional services call at the station during the peak hours, increasing the service to up to 22 tph in each direction, with up to 8 tph during the peak hours running to and from Stratford instead of Bank.

Preceding station	National Rail	Following station
Deptford	Thameslink Greenwich Line	Maze Hill
Deptford	Southeastern Greenwich Line	Maze Hill
DLR
Cutty Sark for Maritime Greenwich towards Bank or Stratford	Docklands Light Railway	Deptford Bridge towards Lewisham

== History ==
The National Rail line is one of London's oldest – the London and Greenwich Railway is reputed to be the world's first suburban railway. It was designed by former army engineer George Landmann, and promoted by entrepreneur George Walter. A massive brick viaduct with 878 arches was built to a station in Spa Road (Bermondsey), and later to London Bridge. The line opened on 8 February 1836 from Deptford, and on 24 December 1838 from a temporary station in Greenwich. Greenwich's station building was designed by George Smith and opened in 1840, making it one of the oldest station buildings in the world.

The South Eastern Railway (SER) leased the Greenwich branch from 1 January 1845.

The South Eastern and Chatham Railway was formed on 1 January 1899 and as such took over operation of the station. The SER and London Chatham and Dover Railway formed a "management committee" comprising the directors of both companies and merged the two companies' operations both of which were on the brink of bankruptcy forced by years of bitter competition.

Up to this point the four tracks through the station (two of which had platforms, two of which did not) terminated at a sector plate which is a traverser that rotates around a pivot that is not at the centre and therefore cannot rotate through 360˚. This saves space and means locomotives can be transferred from one track to another. The original railway company's board room was located at that end of the station behind the sector plate. Both of these features were removed when the line was extended towards Maze Hill.

Difficulties in extending the railway over land owned by the Greenwich Hospital led to the station remaining a terminus until the line was extended eastwards via a cut-and-cover tunnel towards Maze Hill, opening on 1 February 1878.

The Southern Railway took over operation of the station following the grouping of 1923.

Up until 1924 there had been two platform tracks and two tracks between them allowing overtaking moves. This facility was removed (possibly in preparation from the forthcoming electrification) and the empty space between the two platforms remained until the arrival of the Docklands Light Railway at the station in 1999.

Two years later following electrification works, a limited service worked by Electric Multiple Units commenced on 10 May 1926 with the full service commencing 19 July. The lines were electrified to the 750v DC system.

Following nationalisation, operation of the station passed to the Southern Region of British Railways on 1 January 1948.

The Docklands Light Railway (DLR) was extended to Lewisham via Greenwich on 20 November 1999, the new platforms lying immediately to the south of the main-line station, occupying the space originally used by the up main line platform, which was itself relocated into the space left 75 years earlier by the removal of the through lines. At the eastern end, the DLR heads underground through a tunnel through Cutty Sark and under the River Thames.

== Connections ==
London Buses routes 129, 177, 199, 386, and night route N199 serve the station. The Quietway 1 cycle route terminates at the station.
