= George Thomas Landmann =

English military and civil engineer (c. 1779–1854)

Colonel George Thomas Landmann (c. 1779 – 27 August 1854) was an English military and civil engineer. He served with the Royal Engineers in Canada, Gibraltar, Portugal, Spain and Ireland. Following his retirement from the army, he worked as a civil engineer and was engineer of the London and Greenwich Railway, the world's first suburban passenger railway.

== Military service ==
Son of Isaac Landmann, professor of artillery and fortification at the Royal Military Academy, George Landmann was born at Woolwich and became a cadet at the Academy on 16 April 1793 before joining the Royal Engineers as second lieutenant on 1 May 1795.

Stationed at Plymouth and Falmouth, he was employed in defensive fortifications at both places. In 1797, he was sent to Canada and employed until the end of 1800 in the construction of fortifications at St Joseph Island, Lake Huron, and then cut a new canal at the Cascades on the Saint Lawrence River. At the end of 1802 he returned to England, helping with fortifications at Portsmouth and Gosport.

In 1805, Landmann travelled to Gibraltar and on 1 July 1806 was promoted to captain. In 1808 he embarked as commanding royal engineer with General Spencer's corps of 7,000 men from Gibraltar, and landed in August at Mondego Bay to join Sir Arthur Wellesley. He was at the Battle of Roliça (17 August) and commanded his corps at Vimeiro on 21 August.

In September, when Major Fletcher went to Spain with Sir John Moore, Landmann assumed the command of his corps in Portugal, constructing a pontoon bridge at Abrantes, on the Tagus, another at Punhete, on the Zêzere, and a flying bridge at Villa Velha.

Fluent in Spanish, he helped calm an uprising against the Marquis de Villel in Cádiz, receiving the thanks of the king of Spain through the secretary of state.

On 23 February 1809 Landmann was granted a commission as lieutenant-colonel in the Spanish engineers, remaining in Cádiz and helping plan fortifications of the city.

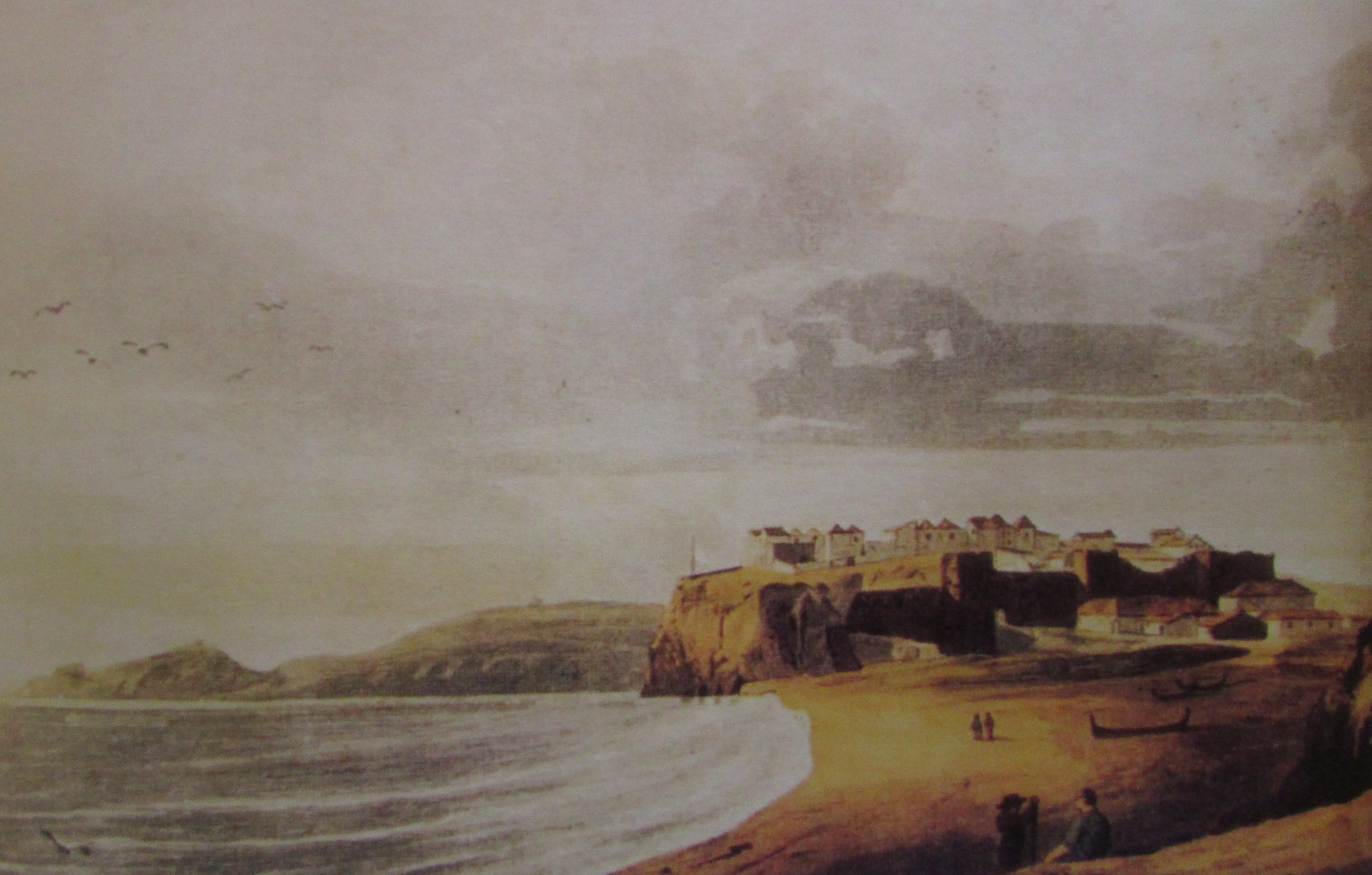
Al-buhera castle, Albufeira in 1810, by Landmann

On 25 March 1810 he was appointed colonel of infantry in the Spanish army, and in April served at the siege of Matagorda. After a brief return to England through ill health, Landmann returned to Lisbon having been appointed one of the military agents in the Peninsula. He was present at the action of Castilejos, near the Guadiana, on 7 January 1811, but suffered further injuries when his horse fell under him.

In March 1812 Landmann sailed for England in company with the Spanish ambassador. His health was now so impaired that he was unable to return to duty until July 1818, and he served the remainder of his army career in the Lough Swilly district of Ireland, and then the Hull district of Yorkshire. He retired with the rank of Lieutenant Colonel on 29 December 1824.

== Civil engineer ==
As a civil engineer, he promoted the design and construction of the London and Greenwich Railway line in south-east London. Other projects included a railway line and docks at Fleetwood in Lancashire (he was engineer to the Preston and Wyre Railway and Harbour Company). He was a member of the Institution of Civil Engineers, published memoirs of his work in Portugal and of military life (Adventures and Recollections, 1852), and died at Shacklewell near Hackney in east London on 27 August 1854.
