= Greenwich line =

Railway line in south London

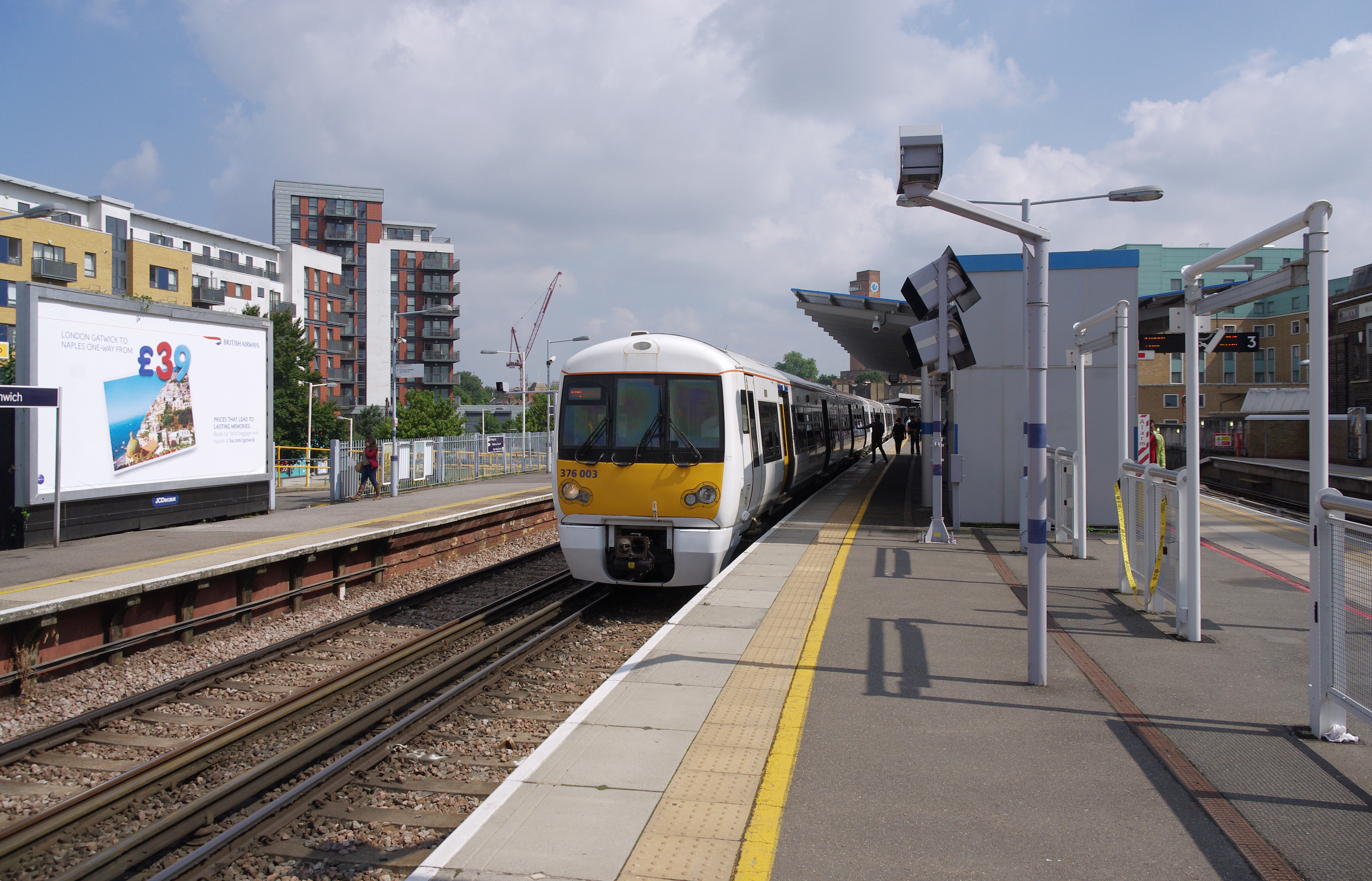
- A Southeastern Class 376 "Electrostar" at Greenwich with a service for London Bridge

Overview
- Status: Operational
- Owner: Network Rail
- Locale: Greater London
- Termini: London Cannon Street; Dartford
- Stations: 4

Service
- Type: Commuter rail, Suburban rail
- System: National Rail
- Operator(s): Southeastern; Thameslink
- Depot(s): Slade Green; Grove Park; Hornsey; Three Bridges
- Rolling stock: British Rail Class 376; British Rail Class 465; British Rail Class 466; British Rail Class 700 Desiro City

History
- Opened: 8 February 1836

Technical
- Line length: 3.08 miles (4.95 km)
- Number of tracks: 2
- Track gauge: 4 ft 8 1/2 in (1,435 mm) standard gauge
- Electrification: 750 V DC third rail
- Operating speed: 60 mph (96.5 km/h)
Route map
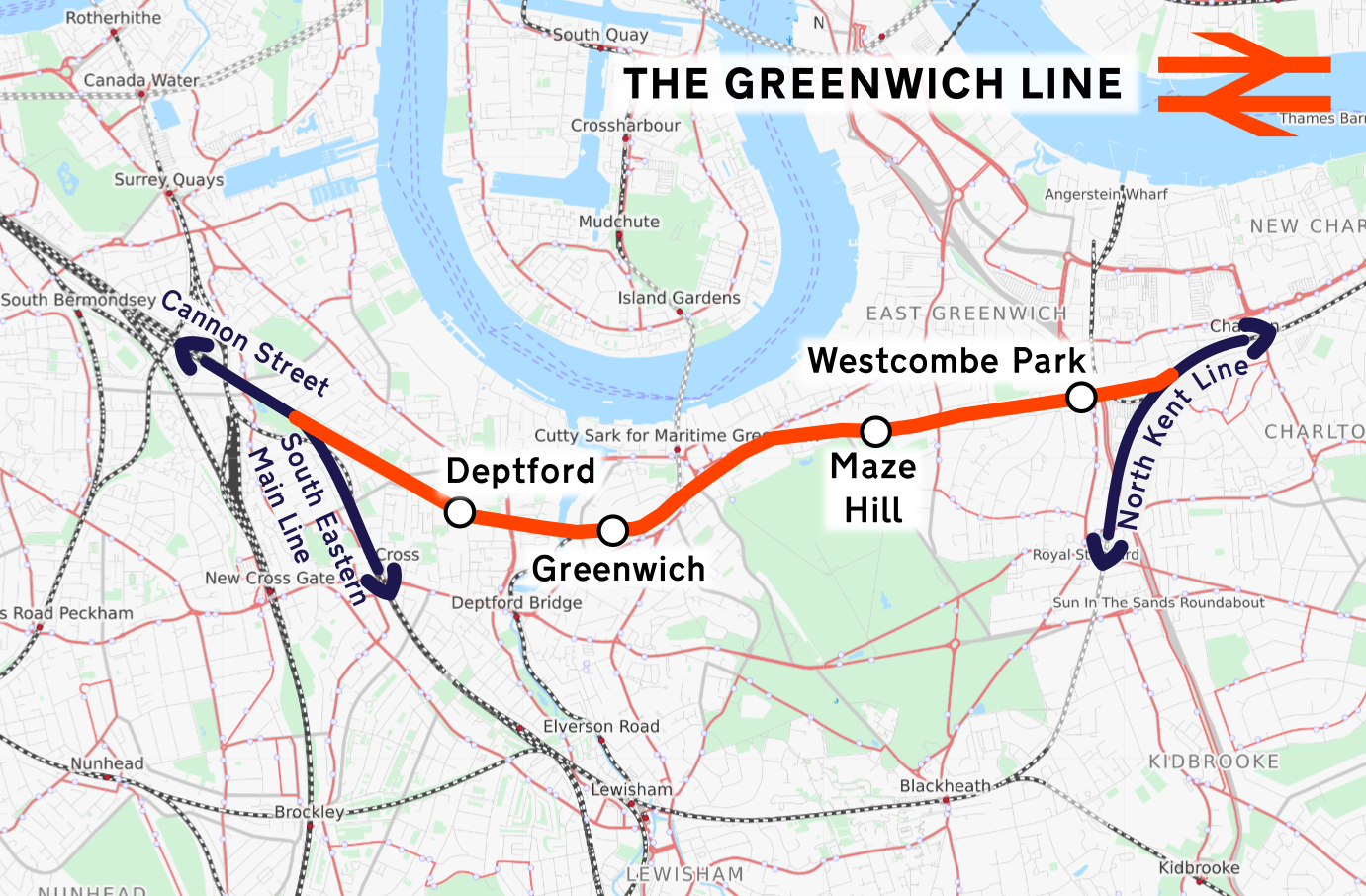
(Click to expand)

The Greenwich line is a short railway line in South London that follows part of the route of the London and Greenwich Railway, which was the first railway line in London.

The line diverges from the South Eastern Main Line at North Kent East junction and runs as far as Charlton junction where it connects with the North Kent Line.

== Stations ==
- Deptford
- Greenwich
- Maze Hill
- Westcombe Park

== History ==
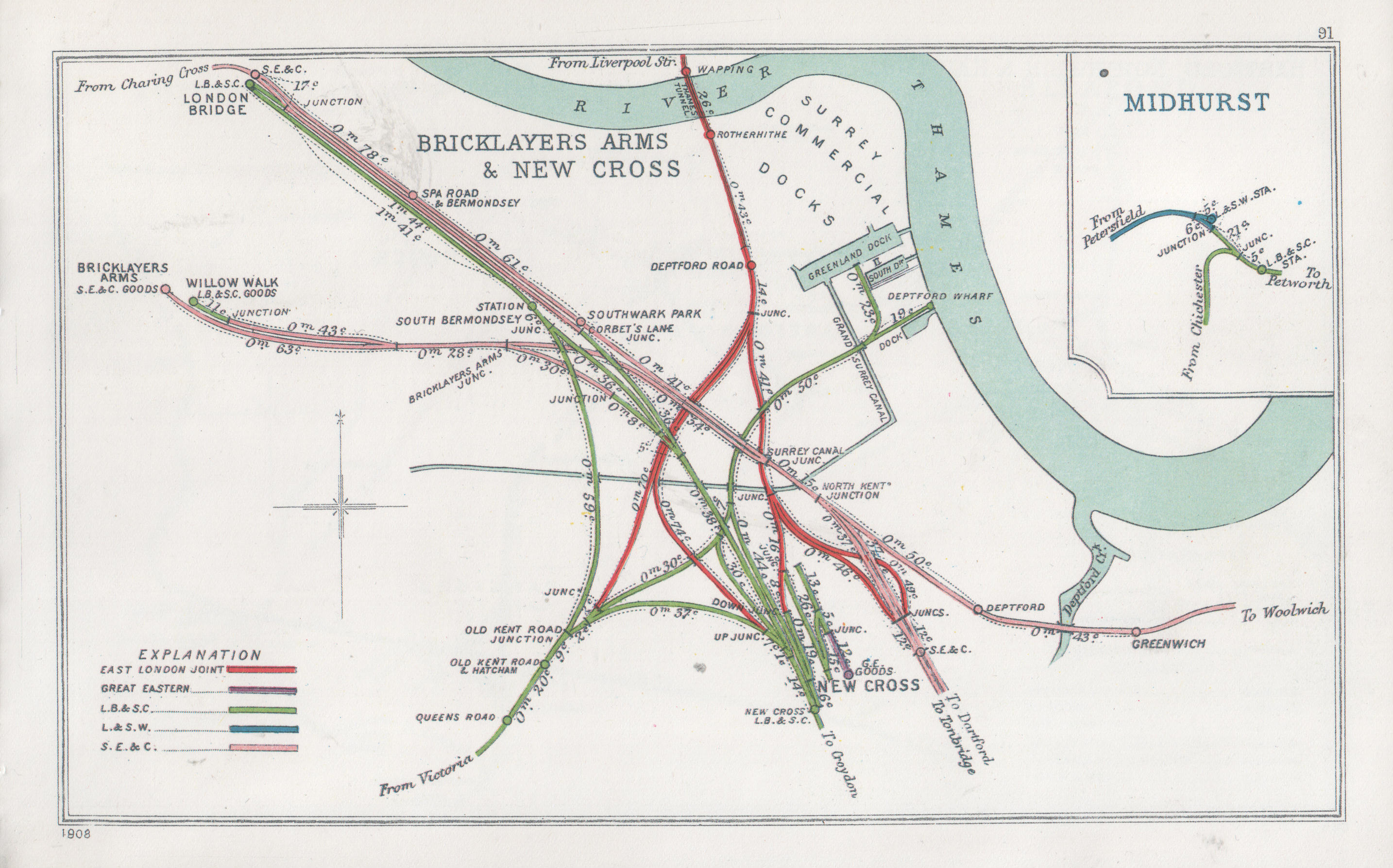
A 1908 Railway Clearing House map of lines around the approaches to London Bridge, including the western end of the Greenwich line

The line was built by the London and Greenwich Railway in 1836, and was the very first passenger railway to be built in the capital. It was electrified with the other South Eastern and Chatham Railway local routes to Dartford on 6 June 1926 by Southern Railway.

From 12 January 2015, services using the Greenwich line were no longer able to serve London Charing Cross. This is due to the Thameslink Programme work, which removed the diamond crossing at Spa Road Junction, located between London Bridge and Deptford. As a result of this, trains using the Greenwich line could no longer reach the lines going into Charing Cross. To compensate for the loss of this, London Cannon Street was given revised service times, with it being open seven days a week and until the end of service.

== Service patterns ==
Passenger services on the line are operated by Southeastern using Class 376, 465 & 466 trains and Thameslink using Class 700.

The current service pattern (as of December 2023) is as follows:

Off-peak:

- Southeastern - 2tph each way between London Cannon Street & Slade Green, continuing to London Cannon Street via Bexleyheath Line
- Thameslink - 2tph each way between Luton & Rainham
