= Stone Crossing railway station =

Railway station in Kent, England

Stone Crossing
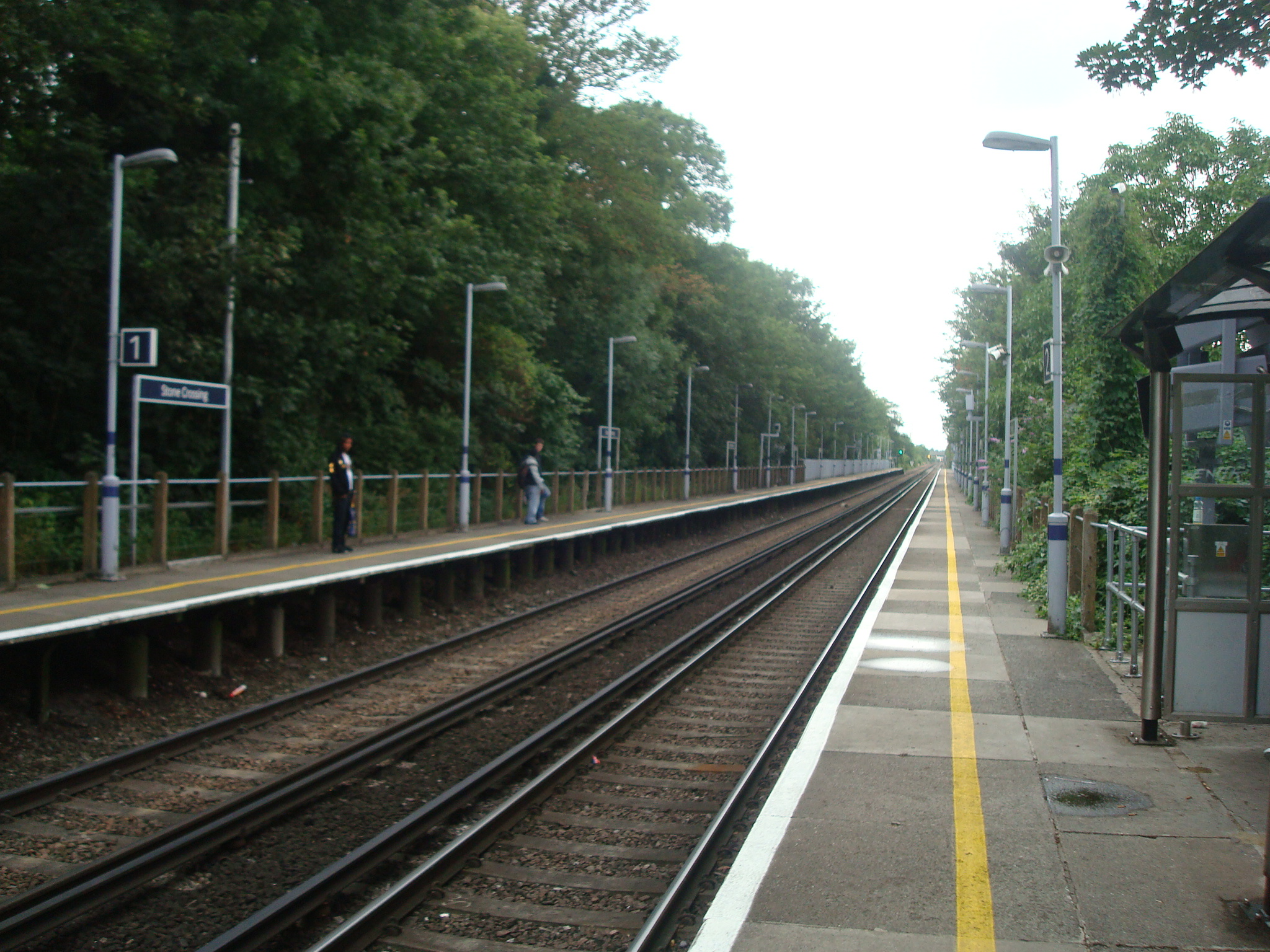

General information
- Location: Stone, Borough of Dartford; England
- Coordinates: 51°27′5.03″N 0°15′50.13″E
- Grid reference: TQ573749
- Manager: Southeastern
- Platforms: 2

Other information
- Station code: SCG
- Classification: DfT category E

History
- Opened: 2 November 1908

Passengers
- 2020/21: ▼82,318
- 2021/22: ▲0.174 million
- 2022/23: ▲0.222 million
- 2023/24: ▲0.277 million
- 2024/25: ▲0.319 million
Location
Notes
- Passenger statistics from the Office of Rail and Road

Stone Crossing railway station is located on the North Kent line, north-east of the village of Stone and east of Dartford. It was originally named Stone Crossing Halt. It is 19 miles 7 chains (30.7 km) down the line from London Charing Cross. Trains are operated by Southeastern and Thameslink.

Train services from the station run eastbound to Gravesend and early morning and late evening onward to Gillingham. Westbound trains run to London Charing Cross via one of the three lines into Central London, the Dartford Loop Line via Sidcup, the Bexleyheath Line or the North Kent Line via Woolwich Arsenal.

Before rail privatisation, a ticket office was provided here, on the 'up' side, in the signal cabin adjacent to the level crossing gates at the eastern end of the station. This became unstaffed thereafter. A PERTIS passenger-operated ticket machine was in due course installed and issued 'Permits to Travel' - exchanged on-train or at staffed stations for travel tickets. In October 2016 the PERTIS machine was removed and replaced with a new ticket machine. The ticket machine is of the newer secure design and only accepts Card Payments. A ticket office service is now provided for 3½ hours in the morning on weekdays.

== Layout ==
Planning applications were lodged by Network Rail in the autumn of 2016 for a footbridge to be built (replacing the level crossing) at a reported cost of over £2 million. The level crossing permanently closed on 25 February 2018 and the following day an adjacent footbridge, with ramped access, was opened.

== Services ==
Services at Stone Crossing are operated by Southeastern and Thameslink using Class 376, 465, 466, 700 and 707 EMUs.

The typical off-peak service in trains per hour is:

- 2 tph to London Charing Cross via Sidcup
- 2 tph to Luton via Woolwich Arsenal and Greenwich
- 2 tph to Gravesend
- 2 tph to Rainham via Chatham

Additional services, including trains to and from London Cannon Street via Woolwich Arsenal and Lewisham call at the station during the peak hours.

Preceding station	National Rail	Following station
Dartford	Southeastern North Kent Line	Greenhithe
Dartford	Thameslink North Kent Line	Greenhithe
