= Lee railway station =

National Rail station in London, England

Lee
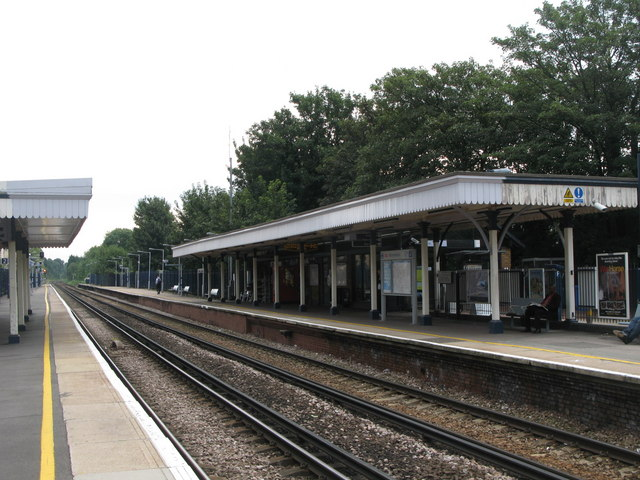
- Interactive map of Lee

General information
- Location: Lee
- Local authority: London Borough of Lewisham
- Managed by: Southeastern
- Owner: Network Rail
- Station code: LEE
- DfT category: D
- Number of platforms: 2
- Accessible: Yes
- Fare zone: 3

National Rail annual entry and exit
- 2020–21: ▼0.432 million
- 2021–22: ▲0.979 million
- 2022–23: ▲1.187 million
- 2023–24: ▲1.368 million
- 2024–25: ▲1.483 million

Key dates
- 1 September 1866: Opened

Other information
- External links: Departures; Facilities
- Coordinates: 51.4497°N 0.0135°E

Lee station is a suburban station on Burnt Ash Hill in Lee in south-east London, England, between Hither Green and Mottingham on the Dartford loop (also known as the Sidcup line). It is 7 miles 66 chains (12.6 km) down the line from London Charing Cross. The station name appears as Lee (London) on tickets. It was opened by the South Eastern Railway in 1866.

It is operated by Southeastern.

== History ==
The station opened on 1 September 1866. Goods facilities were meagre at first with a single siding on the down side just east of the station building, but the goods yard was gradually enlarged over the years as freight traffic increased in importance. In the early 1870s a second siding was installed dedicated to coal, and a coal shed was erected across the track. Later a further pair of sidings was inserted alongside the existing tracks. An SER-designed signal cabin was positioned some 150 yards (140 m) east of the up side station structure. In 1955 the platforms were lengthened to accommodate ten carriage trains. In British Railways days the SR green totem signs displayed the station name as Lee for Burnt Ash. In 1963, Colfe's School moved to its current location adjacent to Lee station, the station remains a method of transport for a significant portion of students. The goods yard closed in 1968. In 1988 the clapboard up side ticket office was demolished and replaced by a new ticket office. In 1992 the platforms were lengthened to accommodate twelve carriage trains.

== Location ==
Lee Station is in Burnt Ash Road, Lee, in the London Borough of Lewisham.

== Connections ==
London Buses routes 202, 261, 273 and SL4 serve the station.

== Facilities ==
The station has two platforms. Platform 1, the up platform for services to London, and Platform 2, the down platform for services to Kent. A ticket hall is situated on the up side but the station has no ticket gates. There is a subway connecting both platforms. There is step free access to both platforms.

== Services ==
All services at Lee are operated by Southeastern using Class 376, 465, 466 and 707 EMUs.

The typical off-peak service in trains per hour is:

- 4 tph to London Charing Cross (2 of these run direct and 2 run via Lewisham)
- 4 tph to Dartford of which 2 continue to Gravesend

Additional services, including trains to and from London Cannon Street via either Lewisham, or via Woolwich Arsenal and Greenwich, and to London Blackfriars call at the station during the peak hours.

Preceding station	National Rail	Following station
Hither Green	Southeastern Dartford Loop Line	Mottingham
