= New Eltham railway station =

National Rail station in London, England

New Eltham
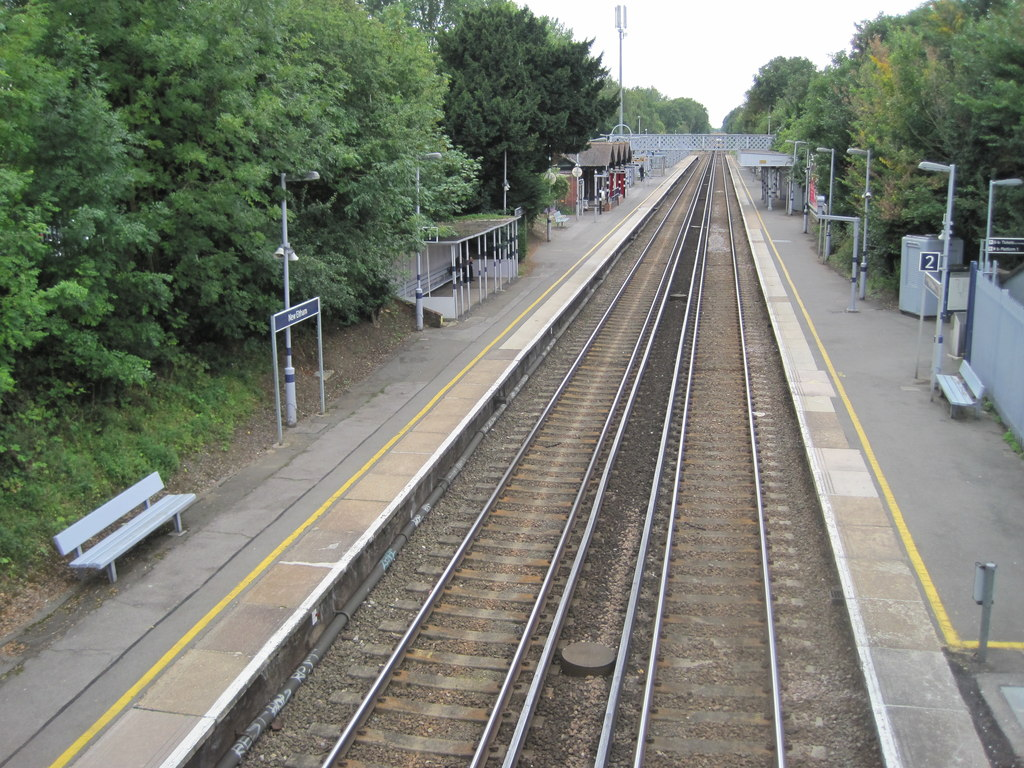
- Interactive map of New Eltham

General information
- Location: New Eltham
- Local authority: Royal Borough of Greenwich
- Managed by: Southeastern
- Station code: NEH
- DfT category: C2
- Number of platforms: 2
- Fare zone: 4

National Rail annual entry and exit
- 2020–21: ▼0.590 million
- 2021–22: ▲1.370 million
- 2022–23: ▲1.722 million
- 2023–24: ▲1.876 million
- 2024–25: ▲2.038 million

Key dates
- 1 April 1878: Opened

Other information
- External links: Departures; Facilities
- Coordinates: 51.4375°N 0.0722°E

New Eltham railway station is in the Royal Borough of Greenwich in south-east London. It is 10 miles 32 chains (16.7 km) down the line from London Charing Cross.

It is operated by Southeastern and is in London fare zone 4. It has two platforms: Platform 1 the "up" platform for services to London and Platform 2 the "down" platform, for services towards Kent.

== History ==
New Eltham station was opened as Pope Street Station in April 1878, twelve years after the opening of the Dartford Loop Line. The station was renamed New Eltham in 1886 although Pope Street was retained as a suffix until 1927. It had a goods yard on the up side which closed in 1963 and eventually became a car park, and a signal box just beyond the western end of the down platform. In 1955 the platforms were extended to take ten carriage trains. In the same year the signal box was taken out of use and demolished. The up side booking office was rebuilt in 1988.

== Location ==
The station is located in New Eltham in a shallow cutting near the crossroads of Footscray Road and Avery Hill Road.

== Connections ==
London Buses route 160, 162, 233, 314, 321 and B13 serve the station.

== Facilities ==
The station has been added to the Department for Transport "Access for All" scheme. The footbridge linking the two platforms was removed in the summer of 2013 and replaced with a new accessible footbridge with lifts which became operational in December 2014. Both platforms are accessible without using steps.

== Services ==
All services at New Eltham are operated by Southeastern using Class 376, 465, 466 and 707 EMUs.

The typical off-peak service in trains per hour is:

- 4 tph to London Charing Cross (2 of these run direct and 2 run via Lewisham)
- 4 tph to Dartford of which 2 continue to Gravesend

Additional services, including trains to and from London Cannon Street via either Lewisham, or via Woolwich Arsenal and Greenwich, and to London Blackfriars call at the station during the peak hours.

Preceding station	National Rail	Following station
Mottingham	Southeastern Dartford Loop Line	Sidcup
