= Mottingham railway station =

National Rail station in London, England

Mottingham
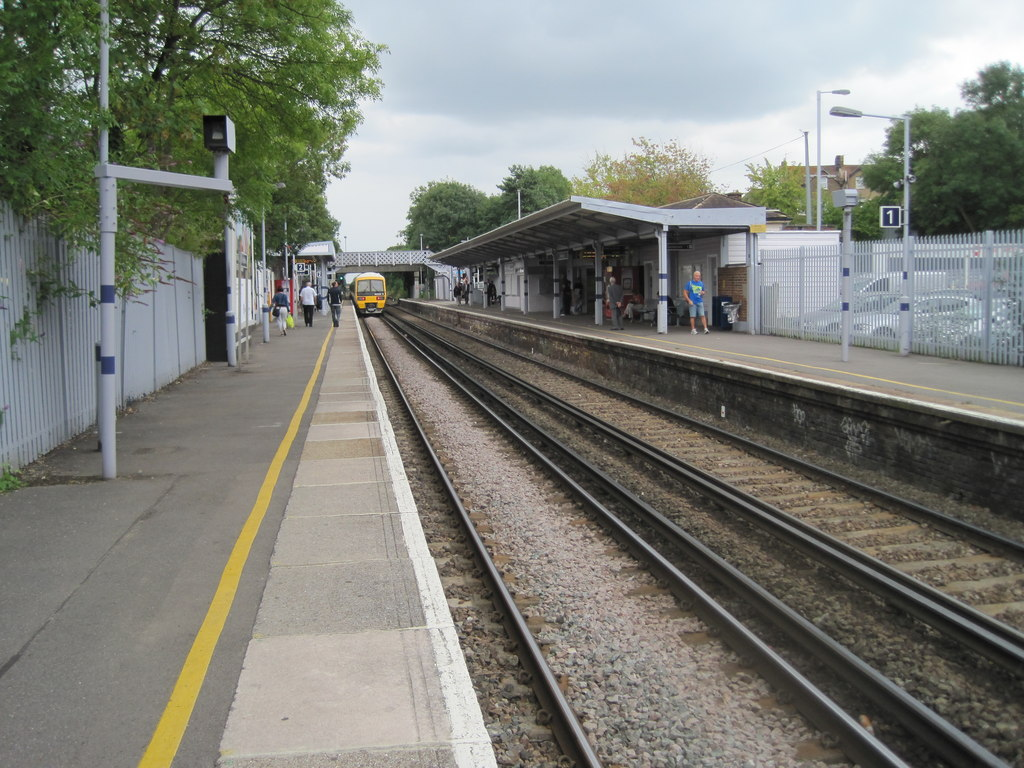
- Interactive map of Mottingham

General information
- Location: Eltham
- Local authority: Royal Borough of Greenwich
- Managed by: Southeastern
- Station code: MTG
- DfT category: D
- Number of platforms: 2
- Accessible: Yes
- Fare zone: 4

National Rail annual entry and exit
- 2020–21: ▼0.393 million
- 2021–22: ▲0.846 million
- 2022–23: ▲1.050 million
- 2023–24: ▲1.282 million
- 2024–25: ▲1.375 million

Key dates
- 1 September 1866: Opened

Other information
- External links: Departures; Facilities
- Coordinates: 51.4401°N 0.0504°E

Mottingham railway station is a station situated on Court Road between Eltham and Mottingham, in the Royal Borough of Greenwich, south-east London. It is 9 miles 40 chains (15.3 km) down the line from London Charing Cross the terminus of the Dartford loop line. The station is located in London fare zone 4 between Lee and New Eltham.

The station is operated by Southeastern.

== History ==
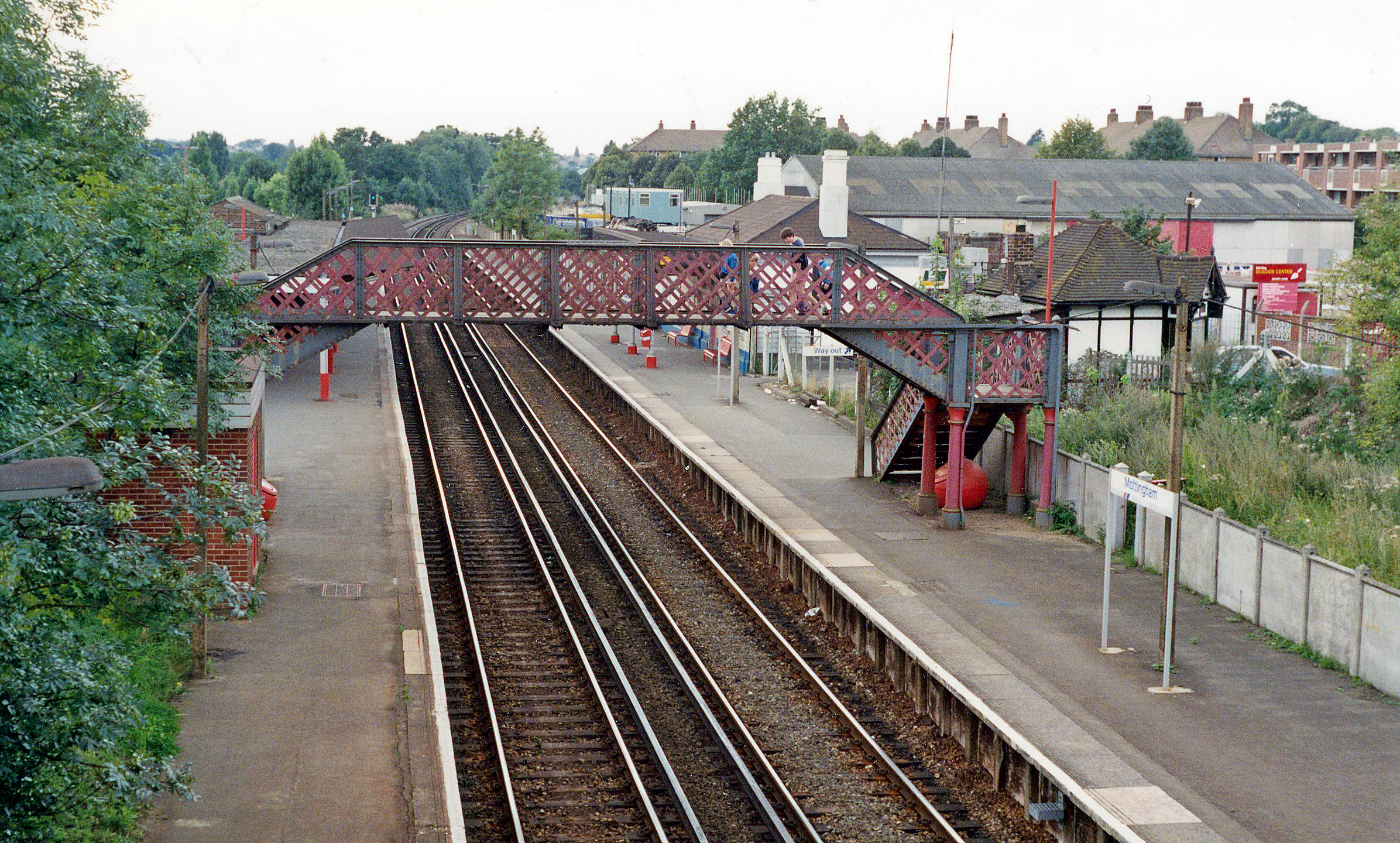
Platform view (1991)

The station was first opened by the South Eastern Railway on 1 September 1866 as Eltham for Mottingham. In 1892 it was renamed Eltham & Mottingham. In 1927 it became Mottingham.

The goods yard on the down side to the west of the platforms included a large coal office. A footbridge linking the two platforms was opened in the 1890s. Half a dozen sidings used for rolling stock were built around 1900 on the down side opposite the goods yard.

A three-storey high substation was built next to the station when the Dartford Loop Line was electrified in 1926. The substation was demolished in 1957 later to be replaced by more powerful substations at New Eltham and Hither Green.

On 19 March 1946 the station was the location of a fatal accident when an electric passenger train collided with a stationary light engine that was waiting to move into the sidings. The driver of the passenger train was killed and 13 passengers injured.

In 1955 the platforms were lengthened to take ten carriage trains. The goods yard closed and five of the six rolling stock sidings were decommissioned in 1968. The signal box closed the following year. In 1992 the platforms were lengthened again and in 2012 the platforms were extended for a final time in order to take twelve carriage trains.

The up side ticket office has a mixture of structures, the white clapboard dating from the original station of 1866, with brown brick construction of 1957 and sliding doors installed in 1988.

== Location ==
Mottingham Station is situated in the town of Mottingham, on Court Road close to its junction with the A20 Sidcup bypass and opposite The Tarn nature reserve and garden. The A20 road outside is a popular hitchhiking spot to Dover.

The station is served by London bus routes 124, 126, 161, 624.

== Facilities ==
The station has two platforms. Platform 1 is the up platform for westbound services to London and Platform 2 is the down platform for eastbound services to Kent. A ticket hall is situated on the up side but the station does not have ticket gates. There is an accessible toilet, as well as separate toilets for women and men. There is step free access to both platforms.

The station has a car park.

== Services ==
All services at Mottingham are operated by Southeastern using Class 376, 465, 466 and 707 EMUs.

The typical off-peak service in trains per hour is:

- 4 tph to London Charing Cross (2 of these run direct and 2 run via Lewisham)
- 4 tph to Dartford of which 2 continue to Gravesend

Additional services, including trains to and from London Cannon Street via either Lewisham, or via Woolwich Arsenal and Greenwich, and to London Blackfriars call at the station during the peak hours.

| Preceding station | National Rail | Following station |
|---|---|---|
| Lee | Southeastern Dartford Loop Line | New Eltham |
