= Eltham (disambiguation) =

Eltham is a district of southeast London, England, within the Royal Borough of Greenwich.

Eltham may also refer to:

- Eltham, Alberta, Canada
- Eltham, New Zealand, a small town in southern Taranaki, New Zealand.
- Eltham, Victoria, a suburb of Melbourne, Victoria, Australia.
- Eltham, New South Wales, a small rural place approximately 14 km (8.7 mi) northeast of Lismore
- Eltham, Virginia, a small unincorporated community in New Kent County, Virginia, United States

== See also ==
=== Eltham, London ===
- Eltham railway station
- Mottingham railway station, a different railway station, south of Eltham in Mottingham that was previously named Eltham station.
- Eltham (UK Parliament constituency), a former constituency in the House of Commons of the UK Parliament.
- Eltham Palace, a large house in Eltham, currently owned by English Heritage and open to the public.
- Eltham Well Hall rail crash, a derailment on the British railway system 1972.
- Eltham College, an independent school in Mottingham, south of Eltham.
- Eltham ordinances, a set of reforms to the administration of Henry VIII of England's court.
- John of Eltham, Earl of Cornwall John of Eltham, (1316–1336), son of Edward II of England and Isabella of France.
- Earl of Eltham, a title that has been created twice as a subsidiary title.
- New Eltham, a smaller district, previously called Pope Street, southeast of Eltham.
  - New Eltham railway station

=== Eltham, Victoria ===
- Eltham railway station, Melbourne
- Electoral district of Eltham
- Shire of Eltham, a Local Government that existed from 1856 until 1994. located about 25 kilometres (16 mi) northeast of Melbourne.
- Eltham Wildcats, basketball club
- Eltham Football Club
- Eltham College (Victoria), a private high school, situated in Research, northeast of Eltham, Victoria.
- Eltham High School
- Eltham North, Victoria, a suburb of Melbourne, north of Eltham, Victoria.

=== Eltham, Virginia ===
- Battle of Eltham's Landing, an 1862 battle, part of the Peninsula Campaign of the American Civil War.
