= Dartford Loop Line =

Railway line in the UK

Overview
- Status: Operational
- Owner: Network Rail
- Locale: Greater London
- Termini: Charing Cross; Dartford

Service
- Type: Commuter rail, Suburban rail
- System: National Rail
- Operator(s): Southeastern
- Rolling stock: British Rail Class 376; British Rail Class 465; British Rail Class 466; British Rail Class 707

Technical
- Number of tracks: 2
- Track gauge: 4 ft 8 1/2 in (1,435 mm) standard gauge
- Electrification: 750 V DC third rail
Route map
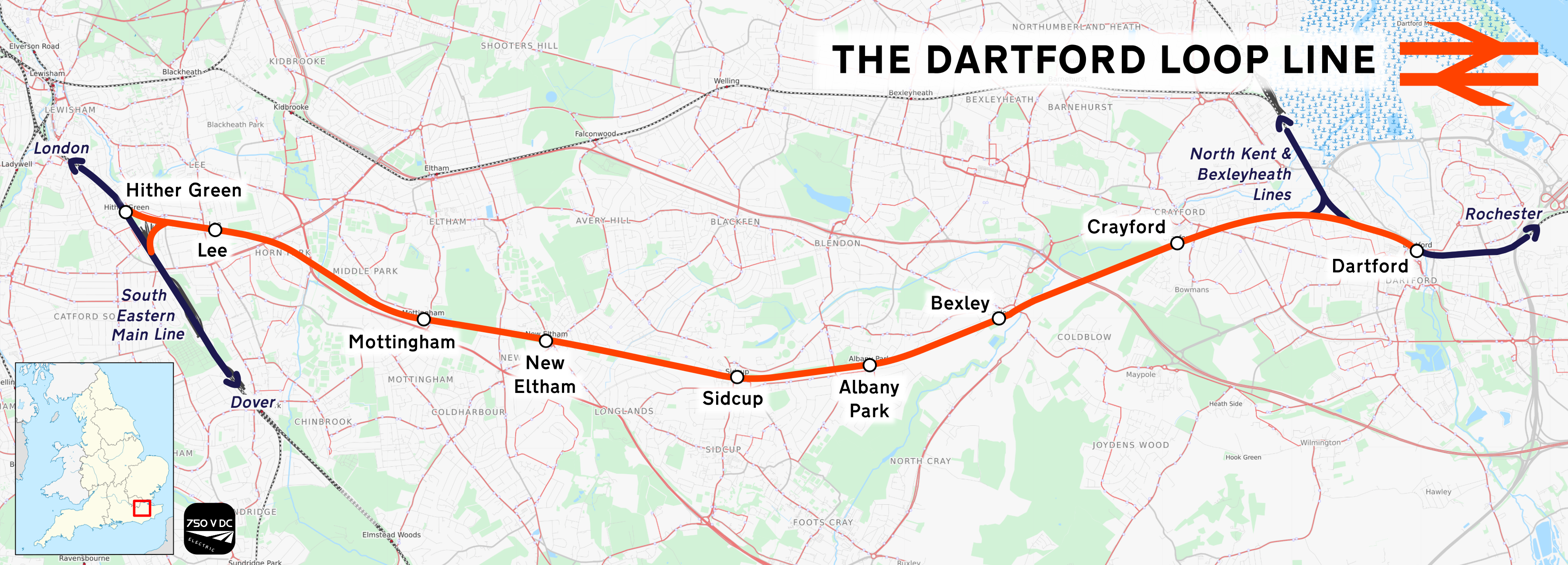
(Click to expand)

The Dartford Loop Line is one of three lines linking London with Dartford in Kent, England. It lies to the south of the other two: the North Kent Line (or Woolwich Line) and the Bexleyheath Line.

Informally, the line is known as the Sidcup Line in the context of Southeastern Metro services.

== History ==
In June 1862 the South Eastern Railway obtained powers for a second 10-mile (16 km) line between London and Dartford from a junction with the main line at Hither Green to its existing North Kent line to reduce congestion on the existing line and to give a more direct route between London and Dartford. This was to be routed via the town of Sidcup.

The Dartford Loop Line opened on 1 September 1866. A loop line in railway terminology is a line which leaves the main line at one location, and then rejoins in another place. The line initially had only five new stations: Lee, Eltham (now Mottingham), Sidcup, Bexley and Crayford. The station at Hither Green, near Lewisham, where the line deviates from the main line, was built after the opening of the third North Kent route, the Bexleyheath Line in 1895.

Pope Street, now New Eltham station, opened in 1878 between Eltham and Sidcup stations. Hither Green finally opened in 1895 serving both the Dartford Loop Line and the main line via Tonbridge. The final station to open was Albany Park in 1935. The Loop Line originally passed through mainly open country and farm land but it stimulated development around the new stations.

In 1899 the Lee Spur, a double track link between the up line of the Dartford Loop Line and the Hither Green marshalling yard, was built. The spur is occasionally used by freight and engineering work trains.

The Loop Line was electrified by the Southern Railway in 1926 along with the two other lines to Dartford.

In 1942 a double-track loop (the ‘Crayford Spur’) came into operation between the North Kent and Dartford Loop Lines, creating a triangular junction. This allowed direct running between the two routes, avoiding the need for a reversing manoeuvre at Dartford.

In 1955 the platforms on all Loop Line stations were extended to accommodate ten-coach trains, whilst continuing standard operation of eight-car trains. Most stations had goods yards which closed during the 1960s and were converted into car parks.

In the late 1960s the Dartford Loop Line along with the two other North Kent routes were re-signalled which saw the replacement of semaphores with colour light signals. In November 1970 most of the mechanical signal boxes on the line closed. In the mid-late 2000s the Dartford Area Resignalling Scheme saw the line resignalled.

== Infrastructure ==
The line is double track throughout and electrified at 750 V DC third rail.

== Stations ==
The line is a little over 8.7 miles (14.0 km) in length. The following are the stations served:

- Hither Green - the station lies on the main line from London to Kent: there are separate platforms for the Loop Line
  - here there is a triangular junction - the Lee Spur - for freight traffic going to the extensive Hither Green freight sidings
- Lee - opened in 1866
- Mottingham - opened in 1866 as Eltham, renamed Eltham & Mottingham in 1892 and then Mottingham in 1927
- New Eltham - opened in 1878 as Pope Street renamed New Eltham in 1886
- Sidcup - opened in 1866
- Albany Park - opened 7 July 1935 to serve a new housing development
- Bexley (the scene of the Bexley derailment)
- Crayford
  - here there is a triangular junction with the North Kent Line providing access to the Slade Green carriage sidings and to Dartford.

== Future plans ==
The line was due to be served by Thameslink trains following the completion of the first phase of the Thameslink Programme. The 2008 Network Rail Route Utilisation Strategy, however, made clear that consideration of running Thameslink trains to Dartford by any route had been abandoned due to timetabling and pathing difficulties. Subsequently, however, Thameslink services between Luton and Rainham (Kent) were introduced running on the North Kent line between London Bridge and Dartford replacing the Charing Cross to Gillingham (Kent) services operated by Southeastern.

== Service patterns ==
Train services on the Dartford Loop Line are operated by Southeastern using Class 376, 465, 466 and 707 EMUs.

As of December 2022, the off-peak, Saturday and Sunday service is:

- 2 trains per hour between London Charing Cross and Dartford via Lewisham calling at all stations except New Cross, St Johns and Albany Park
- 2 trains per hour between London Charing Cross and Gravesend running non-stop from London Bridge to Hither Green, then calling at all stations

During the peak hours, the line is served by an additional 2 trains per hour circular service to and from London Cannon Street which runs both clockwise and anticlockwise using the Dartford Loop Line as far as Crayford, before using the North Kent Line to travel back to London Cannon Street via Woolwich Arsenal and Greenwich.

In addition, there is a single peak hour return service between Dartford and London Blackfriars and a number of services are extended beyond Gravesend to and from Strood and Gillingham During the peak hours.

The Sidcup Line is a freight route for trains to Kent. Most services use the Lewisham flyover via Nunhead.

== Rolling stock ==
Rolling stock used on the line is Class 465 and Class 466 'Networkers', Class 376 Suburban Electrostars and Class 707 Desiro Cities.

== Accidents ==
On 11 October 1977, the derailed wagons of an eastbound coal train were struck by a Northfleet to Dunstable cement train between Lee and Mottingham. The locomotive ended up at the bottom of a garden of a house in Mottingham. There were no serious human injuries but several caged budgerigars in the garden were killed.

On 4 February 1997, an EWS freight train derailed near Bexley station (the Bexley derailment).
