= Sidcup railway station =

National Rail station in London, England

Sidcup
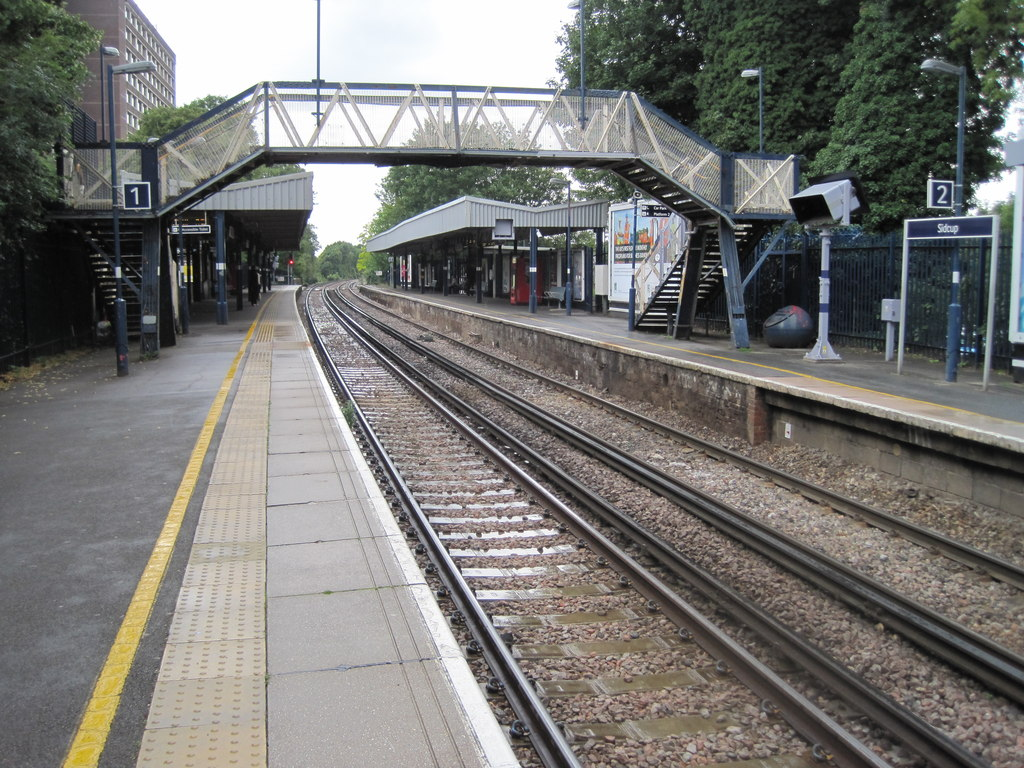
- Interactive map of Sidcup

General information
- Location: Sidcup
- Local authority: London Borough of Bexley
- Managed by: Southeastern
- Station code: SID
- DfT category: C2
- Number of platforms: 2
- Accessible: Yes
- Fare zone: 5

National Rail annual entry and exit
- 2020–21: ▼0.751 million
- 2021–22: ▲1.779 million
- 2022–23: ▲2.179 million
- 2023–24: ▲2.443 million
- 2024–25: ▲2.615 million

Key dates
- 1 September 1866: Opened

Other information
- External links: Departures; Facilities
- Coordinates: 51.4338°N 0.104°E

Sidcup railway station serves Sidcup, south-east London, within the London Borough of Bexley. It is 11 miles 73 chains (19.2 km) down the line from London Charing Cross.

It is in London fare zone 5, and the station is managed by Southeastern.

== History ==
Sidcup station opened on 1 September 1866 with the opening of the Dartford Loop Line. The station was built 1 mile (1.6 km) north of Sidcup town centre in the parish of Lamorbey. It had a small goods yard positioned on the down side and a station master's house. A new booking office was built in 1887. In the early 1890s a signal box was built on the up side which was in use until November 1970. A station hotel was built near the entrance to the goods yard. The hotel was demolished in 1975.

In the 1930s the station was partially rebuilt with new platform canopies. In 1955 the platforms were lengthened to take ten coach trains. In 1965 a footbridge was constructed between the up and down platforms which allowed the closure of the down side booking office. The goods yard closed in August 1966. The following year a short turnback siding was opened at a cost of £50,000 on the down side to the east of the platforms on part of the former goods yard. This enabled services to start or terminate from the station without blocking the main running lines. It was extended in 2013 to accommodate 12 car trains. The remaining area of the goods yard became a car park.

In 1988 a new brick built entrance and booking hall with a glazed pitched-roof opened on the up side. In 1992 the platforms were extended to take twelve coach trains.

In January 2017 the old cross-platform bridge was fully removed, with the new bridge built further along the platform.

== Location ==
The station is situated on Jubilee Way in Sidcup, almost 1 mile (1.6 km) away from Sidcup High Street.

== Connections ==
London Buses routes 51, 160, 229, 233, 269, 286, 492 and SL3 serve the station.

== Facilities ==
The station has two platforms, platform 1 being for trains to Central London via Hither Green and platform 2 for trains to Dartford, Woolwich Arsenal and to Gravesend.

Facilities at the station include a mini cafe, ticket booths, photo booth and toilets. There are also free bike racks and a car park. The station has ticket gates on both up and down platforms, although the down side gates are rarely used outside peak hours.

== Services ==
All services at Sidcup are operated by Southeastern using Class 376, 465, 466 and 707 EMUs.

The typical off-peak service in trains per hour is:

- 4 tph to London Charing Cross (2 of these run direct and 2 run via Lewisham)
- 4 tph to Dartford of which 2 continue to Gravesend

Additional services, including trains to and from London Cannon Street via either Lewisham, or via Woolwich Arsenal and Greenwich, and to London Blackfriars call at the station during the peak hours.

Preceding station	National Rail	Following station
New Eltham	Southeastern Dartford Loop Line	Albany Park
