= Slade Green Depot =

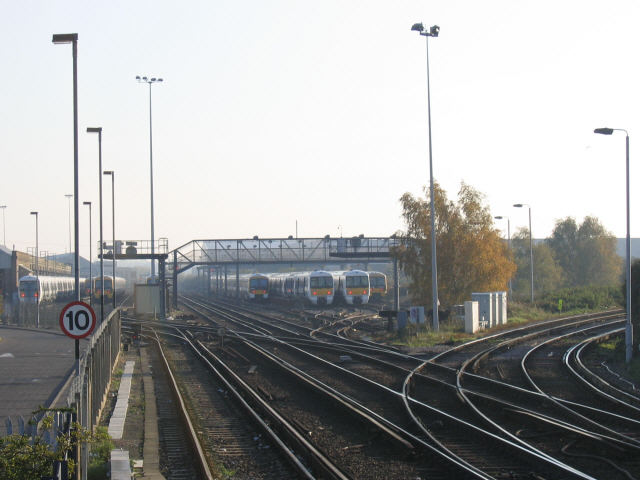
- View of Slade Green Depot, from the platform end of Slade Green railway station. The track curving off to the right is the line to Central London via Bexleyheath, and straight ahead is the main line to Dartford
- Interactive map of Slade Green Depot

Location
- Location: Slade Green, London, England
- Coordinates: 51.4645°N 0.1940°E
- OS grid: TQ524762

Characteristics
- Owner: Network Rail
- Operator: Southeastern
- Depot code: SG (1973-)
- Type: EMU, Departmental

History
- Opened: 1899
- Original: South Eastern and Chatham Railway
- Pre-grouping: South Eastern and Chatham Railway
- Post-grouping: Southern Railway
- BR region: Southern Region
- Former depot code: SLGN

Slade Green Depot is a railway depot in Slade Green in the London Borough of Bexley. The depot is situated south of Slade Green railway station.

== History ==
=== Development ===
The late-Victorian era hamlet of Slade Green consisted of two small farming communities until the South Eastern Railway's (SER) development of the North Kent Line from Strood and Dartford to London Bridge.

After considering enlarging the existing depot at Bricklayers Arms, it was concluded that the growth in freight traffic necessitated a new depot. Land was purchased on Crayford marshes, with plans for a brick-built 10-road shed of 600 feet (180 m) in length, with two of these feeding a repair shed located in the north eastern corner. With a budget of £55,000, construction started in April 1898, with an allowance for building 145 railway workers houses. On 1 May 1895 a triangular junction was opened with the Bexleyheath line.

The shed, initially called Whitehall, Erith was completed on 27 October 1899, under the South Eastern & Chatham Railway (SE&CR). Better equipped than major depots at Stewarts Lane or Ashford, the main building was fed by two 50 feet (15 m) turntables, with a 150,000 imperial gallons (680,000 L; 180,000 US gal) water tank feeding out via a dedicated water softener. The repair shed was equipped with two 5-tonne travelling cranes, allowing full reconstruction of all allocated engines. By the time the first locomotives arrived in November 1899, an external contractor had constructed the 158 houses of the new railway village. The total cost of the project was £74,500, and in scale it was only second to Stewarts Lane, able to service 100 steam locomotives. But its opening allowed closure of the smaller sheds at Woolwich Arsenal and Deptford.

Slades Green railway station was opened to serve the depot and adjoining community on 1 July 1900, and by 1910 the full "railway village" of houses and ancillary community buildings had been completed.

=== Southern Railway ===
After grouping in 1923, the Southern Railway (SR) began the electrification of the former SE&CR suburban lines, but using the London and South Western Railway 660 V third-rail system. It was planned that the line to Dartford would be an early conversion, so the new trains required servicing. In 1924 the SR proposed reconstruction of Slade Green into a dedicated electric maintenance and repair unit. A budget of £30,000 was allocated to convert the existing shed, added to by an adjoining heavy maintenance shed facing Dartford, capable of all repairs and maintenance. Work started immediately, including conversion of the roof to a flat form, and were completed by the end of 1925, with electric services to Dartford commencing on 6 June 1926. In 1935, along with Orpington, the site became home to the first mechanical carriage washer in the UK.

=== British Rail Southern Region ===
With the introduction in 1952 of the BR Class 415 4EPB units, under the Southern Region of British Railways, in June 1954 the shed was extended by 100 feet (30 m) at its London end to fully accommodate a complete 10-carriage unit. The bricks purposefully replicated the original 1899 building, while the new roof had a hump to allow for better rain water removal. On completion, on 1 August 1953, the depot and adjacent railway station officially became Slade Green.

=== 1990/1: Networker depot rebuild ===
With the introduction of the Class 465 Networker and Class 466 Networker fleet, it was proposed in 1990 by British Railways to demolish the 1925 shed and build a brand new eight road structure. Allocated a budget of £20million, the new maintenance depot was officially opened on 8 April 1991, with original BR green 4EPB No. 5001 and a cab mock-up of No. 465001. The new building still had the facilities to carry out heavy repairs on the 1952 slam-door 4EPB stock, a function it fulfilled until the final 4EPB withdrawals in March 1995.

== Present ==
Today the site is owned by Network Rail and operated by Southeastern, providing berthing for a range of different EMUs. It consists of the Networker shed to the northside, and on the other side of the Main line associated sidings to the south, which are linked by a pedestrian overbridge.

EMU types that are stabled there include Class 465 Networker, Class 466 Networker, Class 376 Electrostar and Class 707 EMUs.
