= Dartford railway station =

Railway station in Kent, England

Dartford
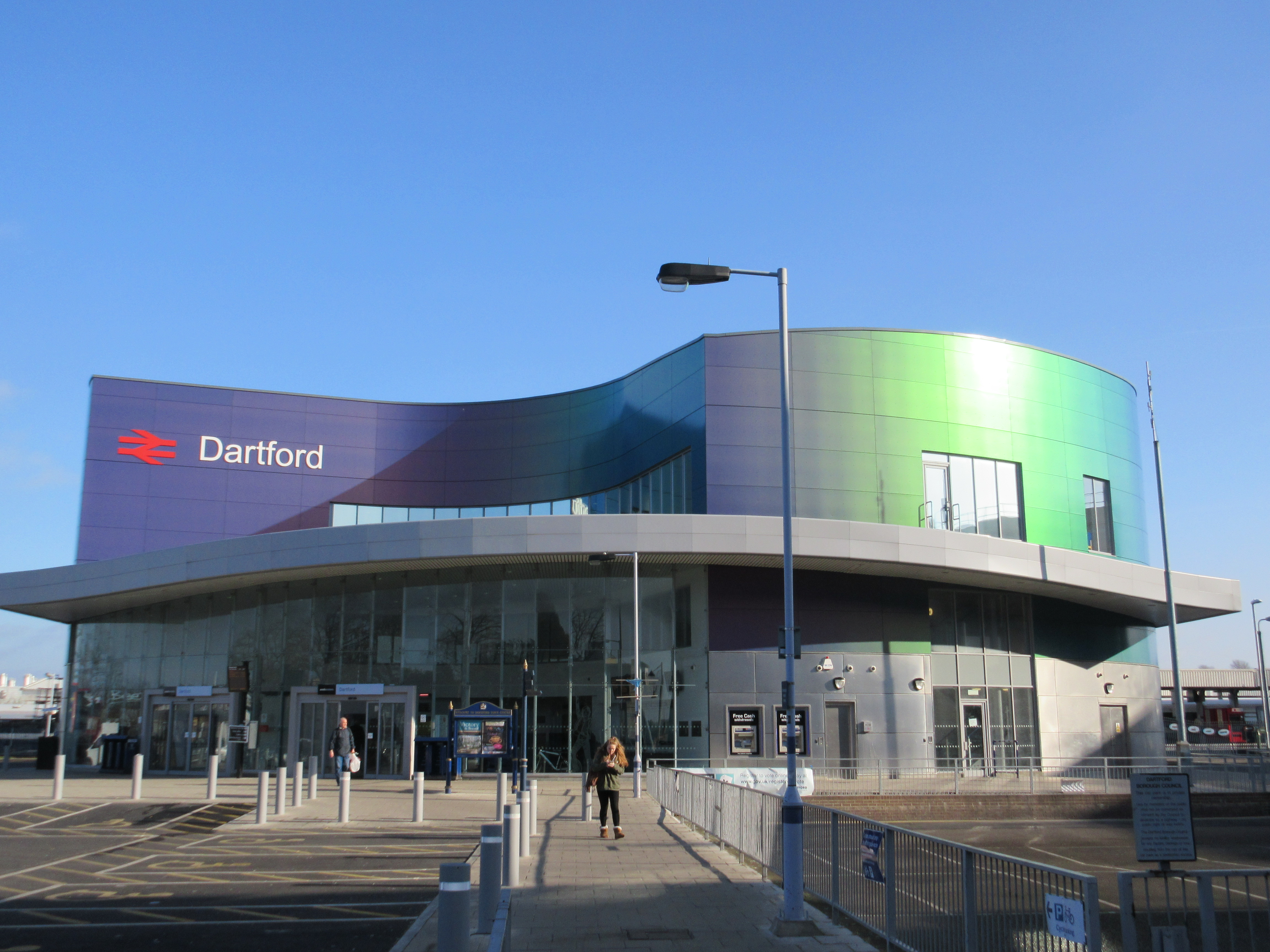
- Interactive map of Dartford

General information
- Location: Dartford
- Local authority: Borough of Dartford
- Grid reference: TQ543743
- Managed by: Southeastern
- Station code: DFD
- DfT category: C1
- Number of platforms: 4
- Accessible: Yes
- Fare zone: 8

National Rail annual entry and exit
- 2020–21: ▼1.485 million
- Interchange: ▼0.105 million
- 2021–22: ▲3.153 million
- Interchange: ▲0.210 million
- 2022–23: ▲3.991 million
- Interchange: ▲0.404 million
- 2023–24: ▲4.498 million
- Interchange: ▼0.312 million
- 2024–25: ▲4.816 million
- Interchange: ▲0.416 million

Key dates
- 30 July 1849: Station opened

Other information
- External links: Departures; Facilities
- Coordinates: 51.4475°N 0.2193°E

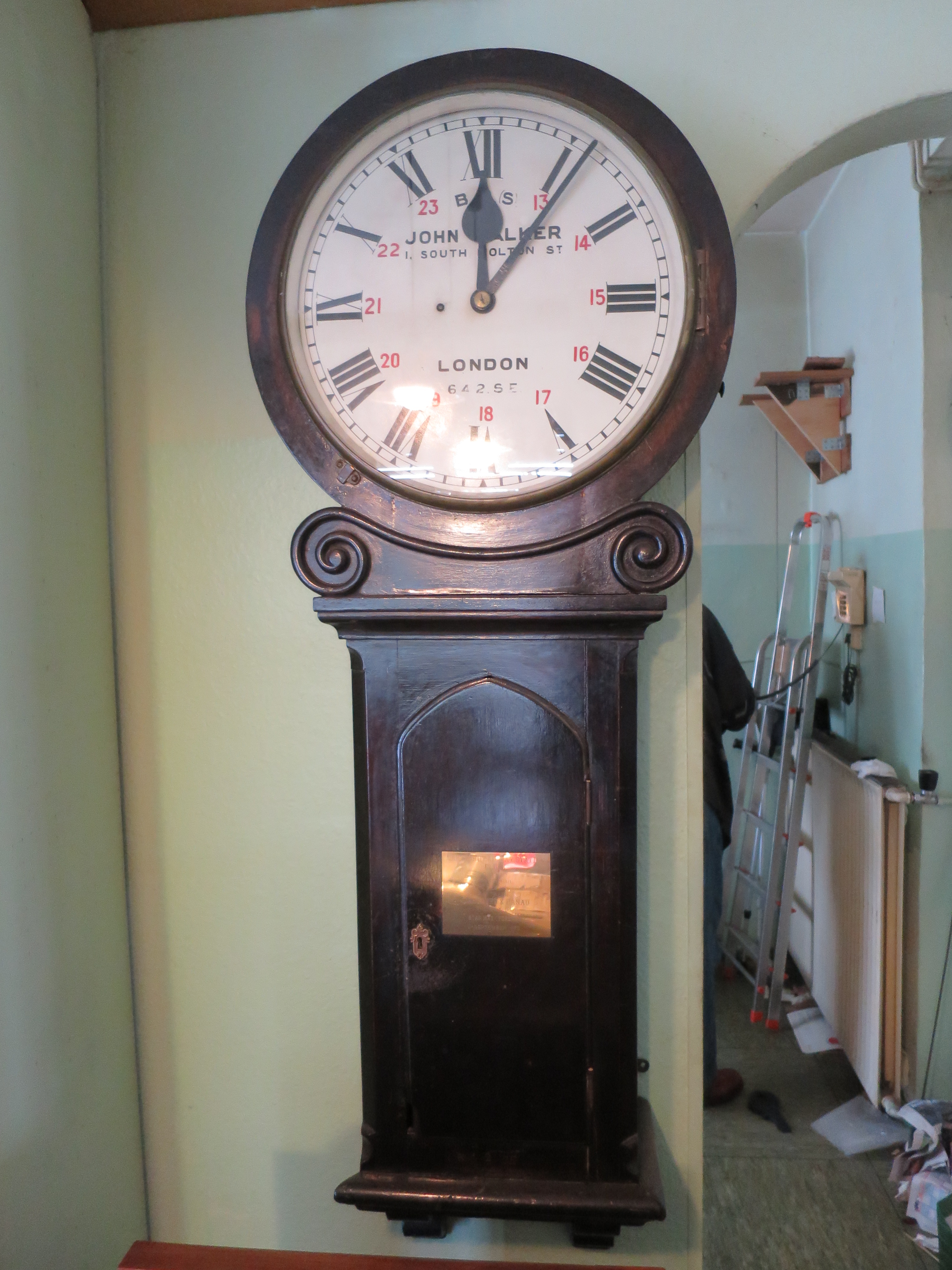
Station clock of Dartford's 19th-century station building (1895)

Dartford railway station serves the town of Dartford in Kent, England. It is 17 miles 12 chains (27.6 km) down the line from London Charing Cross and is in London fare zone 8. Train services from the station are operated by Southeastern and Thameslink. Southeastern also manages the station. Dartford is a major interchange station in the North Kent region of the Southeastern network. Ticket barriers control access to the platforms.

Dartford has become the busiest station in Kent, with an annual passenger usage of 4.62 million in 2018/19. Use of the station increased by 11% between 2018 and 2019, a much higher rate than other stations in Kent. More people use Dartford than Ebbsfleet International and all the other stations in the borough put together.

The station is at the point where three lines from London meet:

- the North Kent Line, via Woolwich Arsenal
- the Bexleyheath line
- the Dartford Loop Line via Sidcup.

Westbound services normally terminate at London Charing Cross, London Cannon Street (both via London Bridge), London Victoria and, for Thameslink trains, Luton and Bedford. Services from London also continue through Dartford to Greenhithe (for Bluewater) to terminate at Gravesend, Strood, Rochester or Gillingham. Thameslink trains terminate at Rainham.

Many of the terminating services at Dartford form London-bound services, but the remainder will be stabled and maintained at Slade Green Depot approximately two miles west on the North Kent Line. There are several sidings to the east of the station where terminating trains can be stabled until such time as needed to return to Dartford to form London-bound services or until drivers are available to return the train to Slade Green Depot.

== History ==
The first station was opened here by the South Eastern Railway. It extended its North Kent Line from Gravesend on 30 July 1849, taking the line from there to London. The original station building had an Italianate design; this was replaced by a glass-and-metal ticket office complex in 1972. A footbridge leads across the line to the two island platforms.

Replacement of the 1972 station building was approved in 2011, with enabling works started late that year, and major works commenced in mid-2012. The new building was completed in November 2013.

== Future development ==
In the future, Dartford station may form part of a Crossrail extension line, linking to Canary Wharf, London Paddington station, Heathrow Airport and Reading.

== Trivia ==
In 1961, Mick Jagger and Keith Richards met by chance at the station, going on to be the core writing team of the Rolling Stones. There is a plaque on the London-bound platform to commemorate this fact.

At one time Dartford railway station gained a lot of attention due to the high numbers of people who travelled using this line while mistakenly not knowing that Oyster cards were not valid; there was evidence of such people being approached by staff and receiving penalty fares. In September 2015, Transport for London extended the London fare zones to add Dartford to zone 8, thus allowing Oyster and contactless payment methods to be used there.

== Services ==
Services at Dartford are operated by Southeastern and Thameslink.

The typical off-peak service in trains per hour (tph) is:

- 4 tph to London Charing Cross via Sidcup (two of these run direct and two run via Lewisham)
- 1 tph to London Charing Cross via Bexleyheath
- 2 tph to London Victoria via Bexleyheath
- 2 tph to London Cannon Street via Woolwich Arsenal and Lewisham
- 2 tph to Luton via Woolwich Arsenal and Greenwich
- 4 tph to Gravesend (two of these call at all stations and two call at Greenhithe only)
- 2 tph to Rainham via Chatham

Additional services call at the station during the peak hours.

Preceding station	National Rail	Following station
Crayford	Southeastern Dartford Loop Line	Stone Crossing or Terminus
Slade Green	Thameslink North Kent Line	Stone Crossing
Slade Green	Southeastern North Kent Line	Greenhithe
Barnehurst	Southeastern Bexleyheath line	Terminus

== Connections ==
London Buses, Arriva Kent Thameside, Kent Country and Go-Coach serve the station.

== Concessionary and electronic ticketing ==
Dartford entered the TfL zonal Oyster/contactless system on Sunday 6 September 2015, in London fare zone 8. While season tickets, daily capping and contactless weekly capping are set at standard zone 8 levels, single fares from Dartford are lower than "standard" zone 8 fares.

This followed Southeastern's agreement to seek to bring Oyster/contactless PAYG to Dartford by 31 January 2016 as part of the 2014–2018 franchise extension.

== Passenger representation ==
Dartford Rail Travellers' Association campaigns for improvements across the seven railway stations in the Dartford area – Dartford, Stone Crossing, Greenhithe for Bluewater, Swanscombe, Ebbsfleet International, Longfield and Farningham Road. The group operates through social media on Facebook and Twitter.
