= British Rail Class 707 =

Electric multiple unit train built by Siemens

British Rail Class 707 City Beam
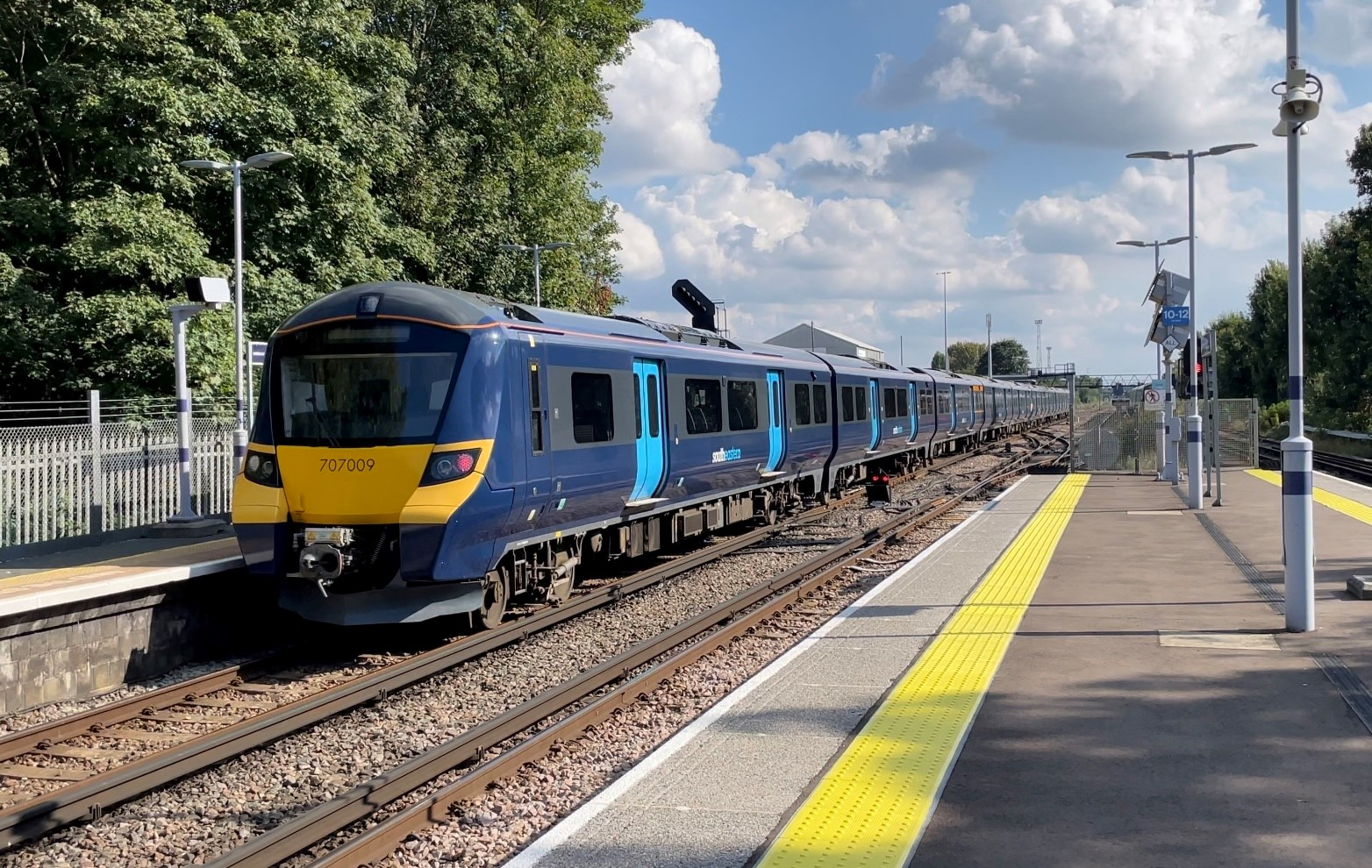
- Southeastern Class 707s at Hither Green

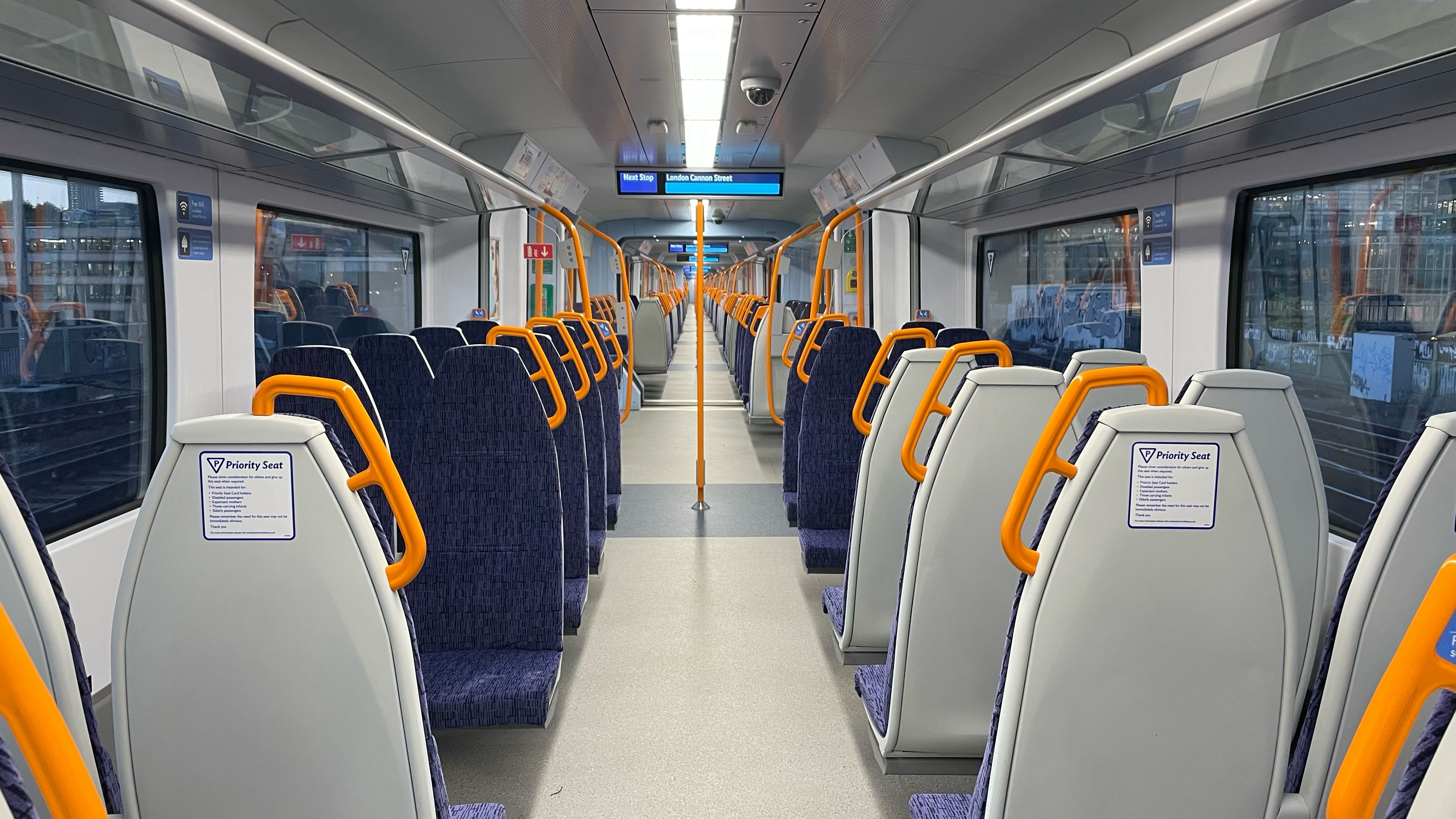
- Interior as refreshed by Southeastern
- Stock type: Electric multiple unit
- In service: 17 August 2017 – present
- Manufacturer: Siemens Mobility
- Built at: Krefeld, Germany
- Family name: Desiro City
- Replaced: Class 465; Class 466
- Constructed: 2015–2018
- Entered service: 2017
- Number built: 30
- Successor: Class 455 (SWR); Class 458 (SWR)
- Fleet numbers: 707001–707030
- Capacity: 275 seats
- Owner: Angel Trains
- Operators: Current: Southeastern; Former: South Western Railway; South West Trains
- Depots: Current: Slade Green; Former: Wimbledon
- Lines served: London Charing Cross/Cannon street and Hayes; London Cannon street loopers (via Slade Green, Barnehust and Crayford); London Charing Cross and Gravesend (via Dartford); London and Sevenoaks

Specifications
- Car body construction: Aluminium
- Train length: 101.6 m (333 ft 4 in)
- Car length: DM cars: 20.52 m (67 ft 4 in); Trailers: 20.16 m (66 ft 2 in)
- Width: 2.80 m (9 ft 2 in)
- Floor height: 1.10 m (3 ft 7 in)
- Doors: Double-leaf pocket sliding (2 per side per car)
- Wheel diameter: 820–760 mm (32.28–29.92 in) (new–worn)
- Wheelbase: Motor bogies: 2,200 mm (87 in); Trailer bogies: 2,100 mm (83 in)
- Maximum speed: 100 mph (160 km/h)
- Weight: 165 tonnes (162 long tons; 182 short tons)
- Axle load: Motor bogies: 15.5 t (15.3 long tons; 17.1 short tons); Trailer bogies: 14.5 t (14.3 long tons; 16.0 short tons)
- Power output: 1,200 kW (1,600 hp)
- Acceleration: 0.85 m/s^{2} (1.9 mph/s)
- Electric systems: Third rail, 750 V DC
- Current collection: Contact shoe
- UIC classification: Bo′Bo′+2′2′+2′2′+2′2′+Bo′Bo′
- Bogies: Siemens SGP SF7000
- Minimum turning radius: 120 m (390 ft)
- Safety systems: AWS; TPWS; (plus provision for ETCS)
- Coupling system: Dellner
- Multiple working: Within class
- Track gauge: 1,435 mm (4 ft 8 1/2 in) standard gauge

Notes/references
- Sourced from unless otherwise noted.

The British Rail Class 707 City Beam is a class of electric multiple unit passenger trains built by Siemens Mobility on its Desiro City platform, and operated in England by Southeastern. The units were previously operated by South Western Railway.

== History ==
=== Background ===
In September 2014, rail franchise operator South West Trains (SWT) announced plans to procure 30 five-car trains to expand its fleet to take advantage of significant infrastructure improvements that would allow the operation of ten-car trains. The Class 707 was the second product purchased for use on the British network from the Desiro City range, following the purchase of the Class 700 for Thameslink. All are leased from rolling stock company (ROSCO) Angel Trains. A further order of trains was expected in future, to allow the wider SWT suburban fleet to be replaced.

Construction of the first vehicles began in June 2015, with the first completed in March 2016. The first two were completed as dual-voltage units with pantographs for operation on 25 kV 50 Hz AC overhead lines. This was a temporary arrangement for testing purposes at Siemens' Wildenrath test centre from May 2016. They also operated in England in this configuration, being tested operating on the East Coast Main Line to Peterborough. The rest of the fleet was delivered with just 750 V DC shoegear for use on third rail electrified lines, but all will have the ability to be modified for dual-voltage use if required in future. The first reached Britain on 9 December 2016. Entry into service was originally planned for July 2017, with all 30 planned to be delivered by the end of 2017.

=== Entry into service with SWT ===
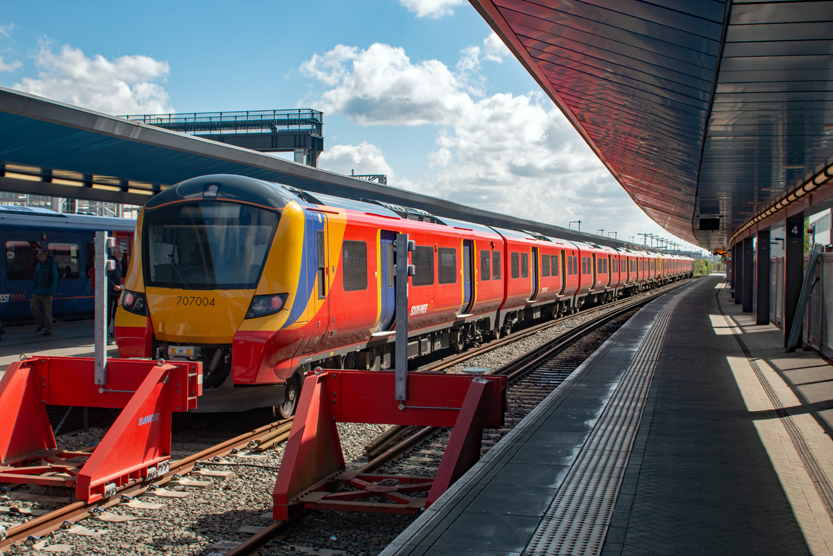
SWT Class 707 at Reading in 2017

The first units entered service with SWT on 17 August, just three days before the South Western franchise was taken over by South Western Railway on 20 August 2017. The last entered service in March 2018.

The Class 707 was introduced on services between London Waterloo and Windsor & Eton Riverside and London Waterloo and Weybridge via Hounslow, allowing the Class 458 trains used on those services to be cascaded back to operations to Reading, which then allowed the Class 450 units to move elsewhere on the network. When operated by South Western Railway, Class 707 units were based at the Wimbledon Traincare Depot.

Despite the 707s being brand new trains, SWR decided in 2021 that they would be replaced as part of a larger order of Class 701 Arterio trains, as the leasing cost of the 707s was around £300k more expensive.

=== Move to Southeastern ===
In April 2020, London & South Eastern Railway signed a deal to lease the entire Class 707 fleet from owners Angel Trains. The first four units were transferred from South Western Railway in January 2021, with fourteen more following in small batches throughout the rest of 2021. The first Southeastern Class 707 units entered service on 27 September 2021. The final twelve were expected to transfer to Southeastern by early 2022, but in January 2022 South Western Railway announced that continuing delays to its Class 701 programme had resulted in it extending its lease on the remaining 12 units until late 2022. By November 2022 the lease had been extended again, into 2023.

Thirty sets are now in service with Southeastern having been transferred from South Western Railway to Southeastern between late 2023 and late 2024. The last two sets from South Western Railway were transferred in September 2024.

Upon their introduction into service, Southeastern branded them City Beams, and deployed them on shorter-distance services from London Cannon Street and Charing Cross stations to Gravesend, Dartford, Sevenoaks, and Hayes. Passengers praised the new trains for providing air conditioning and charging points for mobile devices, but expressed dissatisfaction that they were not fitted with toilets. Southeastern noted in response that it was "not practical" to install toilets in the already-built units, and that the Class 376 units already in use on the same routes were also not fitted with toilets, although Southeastern eventually announced in January 2025 that it would retrofit the Class 707 units with toilets.

== Fleet details ==
Class	Operator	Qty.	Year built	Cars per unit	Unit nos.
707	Southeastern	30	2015–2018	5	707001–707030

=== Named units ===
The following units have received names:

- 707001: Spirit of Ukraine.
- 707005: Remembering Rt Hon James Brokenshire MP Old Bexley and Sidcup.
