= British Rail Class 465 =

British class of electric multiple units

British Rail Class 465 Networker
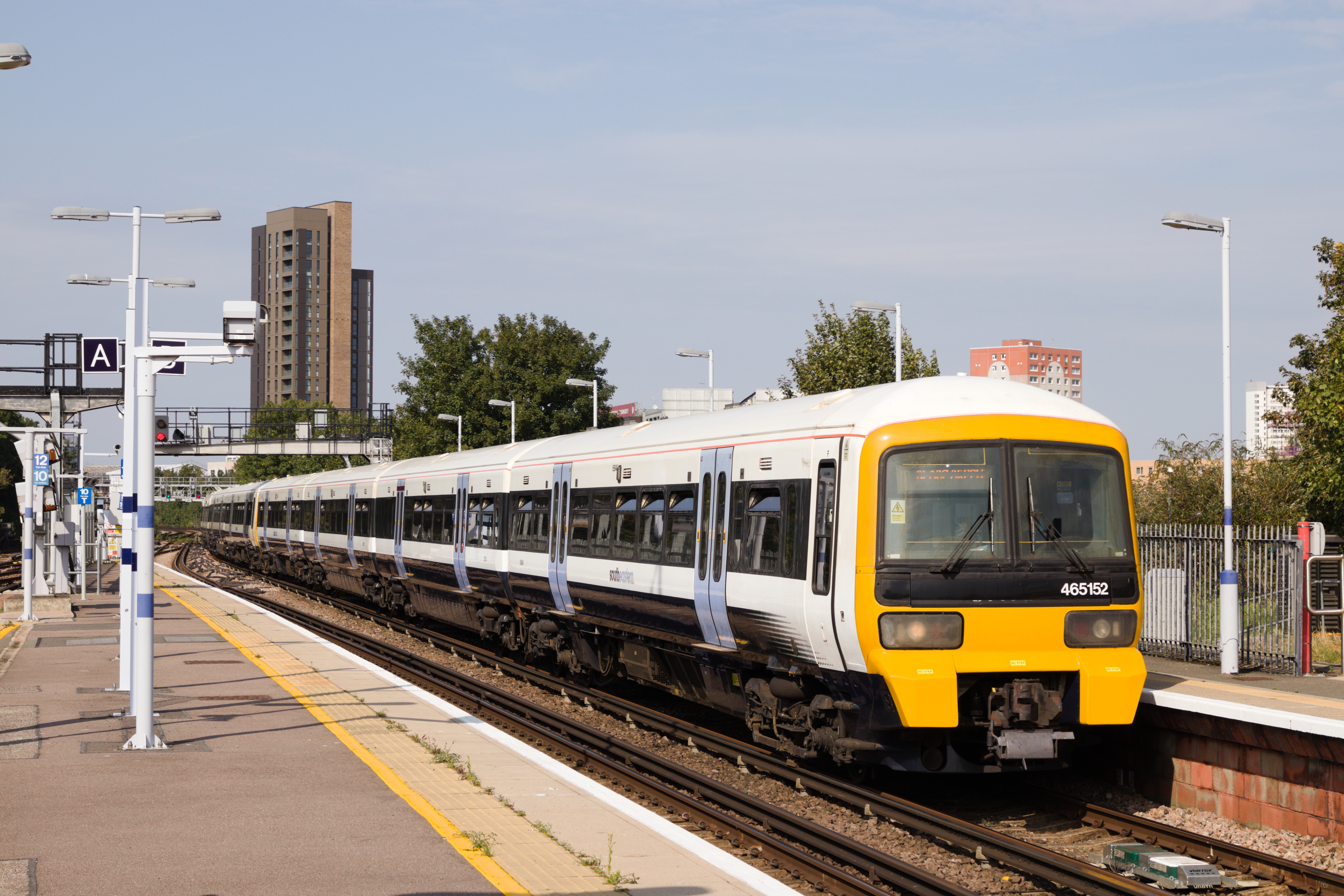
- Southeastern (Govia) Class 465 in 2020

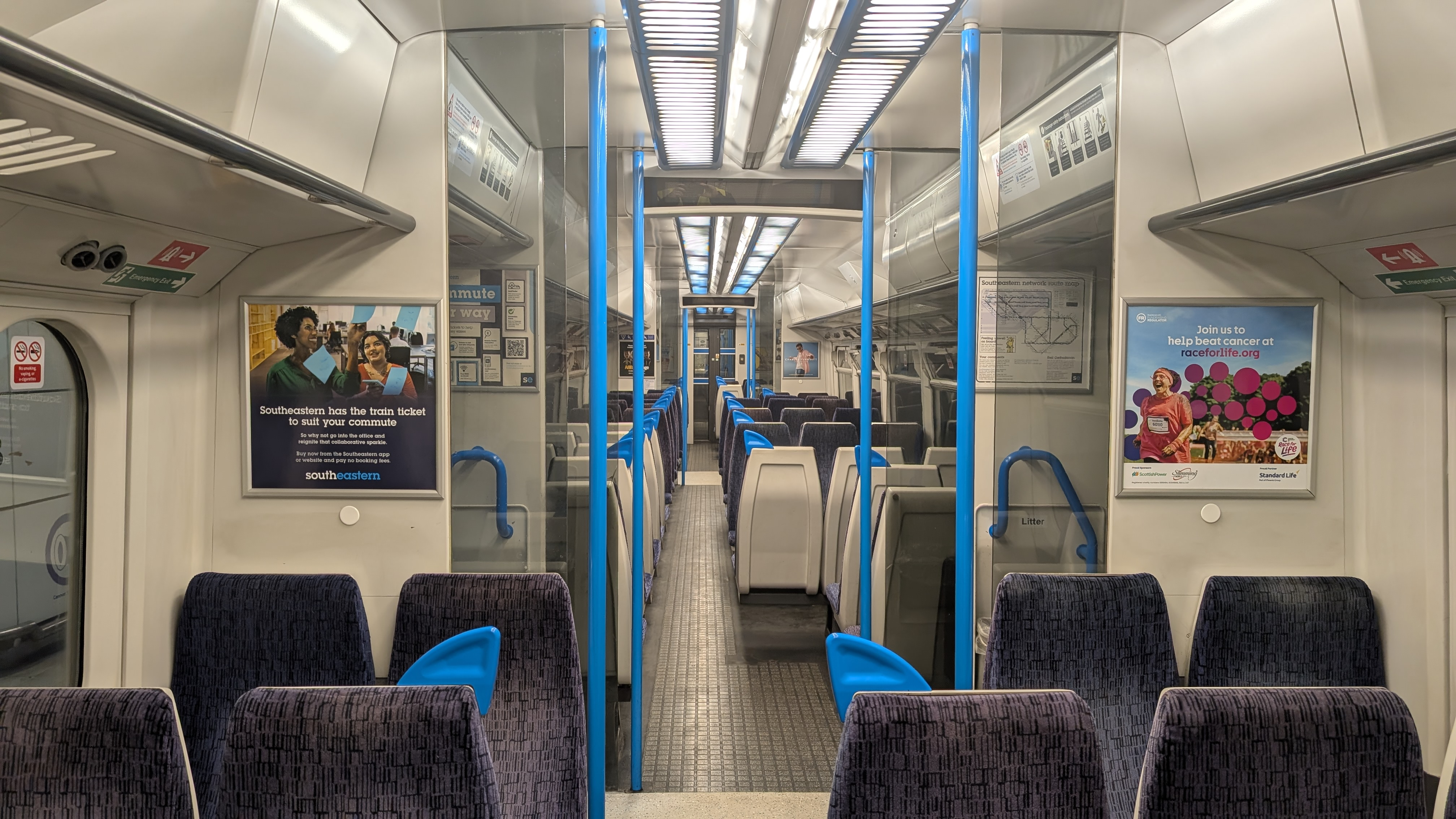
- The refreshed saloon of a Class 465
- In service: 1 December 1992 – present
- Manufacturers: British Rail Engineering Limited; ABB Transportation; Metro-Cammell; GEC-Alsthom
- Built at: York Carriage Works (BREL/ABB); Washwood Heath (Metro-Cammell)
- Family name: Networker
- Replaced: Class 415; Class 416; Class 423
- Constructed: 1991–1994
- Refurbished: 2005 (465/2 conversion to /9); 2010–2012; 2016
- Number built: 147
- Number in service: 116
- Number scrapped: 24
- Successor: Class 707
- Formation: 4 cars per 465/0, /1, /2 unit: DMSO(A)-TSO-TSOL-DMSO(B); 4 cars per 465/9 unit: DMCO(A)-TSO-TSOL-DMCO(B)
- Capacity: 465/0: 334 seats; 465/1: 334 seats; 465/2: 331 seats; 465/9: 319 seats
- Owners: Angel Trains; Eversholt Rail Group
- Operators: Current: Southeastern; Former: Network SouthEast; Connex South Eastern; South Eastern Trains; Southeastern (Govia)
- Depot: Slade Green

Specifications
- Car body construction: Aluminium
- Car length: DM vehs.: 20.89 m (68 ft 6 in); Trailers: 20.06 m (65 ft 10 in)
- Width: 2.81 m (9 ft 3 in)
- Height: 3.77 m (12 ft 4 in)
- Doors: Double-leaf sliding plug (2 per side per car)
- Maximum speed: 75 mph (121 km/h)
- Weight: DMSO vehs.: 39.2 t (38.6 long tons; 43.2 short tons); TSO vehs.: 27.2 t (26.8 long tons; 30.0 short tons); TSOL vehs.: 28.0 t (27.6 long tons; 30.9 short tons)
- Traction system: As built: 465/0 and 1: Brush Traction GTO-VVVF; 465/2 and 9 : GEC Alsthom GTO-VVVF; Upgraded 465/0 and /1 units: Hitachi IGBT-VVVF
- Traction motors: 8 × 3-phase AC; 465/0 & /1: Brush Traction TIM970; 465/2 & /9: GEC-Alsthom G352AY
- Power output: 2,240 kW (3,000 hp)
- Acceleration: 0.98 m/s^{2} (3.2 ft/s^{2})
- Electric systems: 750 V DC third rail
- Current collection: Contact shoe
- UIC classification: Bo′Bo′+2′2′+2′2′+Bo′Bo′
- Bogies: 465/0 & /1: Powered: BREL P3; Unpowered: BREL T3; 465/2 and & /9: Powered: SRP BP58; Unpowered: SRP BT49
- Braking systems: Electropneumatic (disc) and rheostatic/regenerative
- Safety systems: AWS; TPWS
- Coupling system: Tightlock
- Multiple working: Within class, and with Class 466
- Track gauge: 1,435 mm (4 ft 8 1/2 in) standard gauge

The British Rail Class 465 Networker are electric multiple unit passenger trains that were built by Metro-Cammell, GEC-Alsthom, British Rail Engineering Limited (BREL) and ABB Rail between 1991 and 1994. Originally operated by Network SouthEast, these units are now operated by Southeastern.

== Background ==
The Network SouthEast sector of British Rail began the planning for the development of the Class 465 Networker in 1988, and invited a tender for 710 vehicles to be built. The Class 465 was introduced in order to replace the 41-year-old Class 415 (4EPB) slam-door EMUs.

The first unit was delivered in December 1991, and the last unit in April 1995. The units entered passenger service from 1 December 1992 with a ceremony at Cannon Street station, by Transport Secretary John MacGregor. As part of the privatisation of British Rail, the 97 465/0s and 465/1s were sold to Eversholt Rail Group and the 50 Class 465/2s to Angel Trains.

All trains were originally supplied in the Network SouthEast livery and branded as the "Kent Link Networker". They have mostly been used on suburban routes out of London Victoria, Charing Cross, Blackfriars, and Cannon Street to destinations in South London and Kent, and the first 20 Class 465/0s were repainted into the Connex South Eastern Yellow and Blue livery in 1998, the same livery as seen on the 16 Class 365s introduced in June 1997.

Some have been replaced by Class 707s, with two hauled to Worksop for store by Harry Needle Railroad Company in June 2021.

== Construction ==
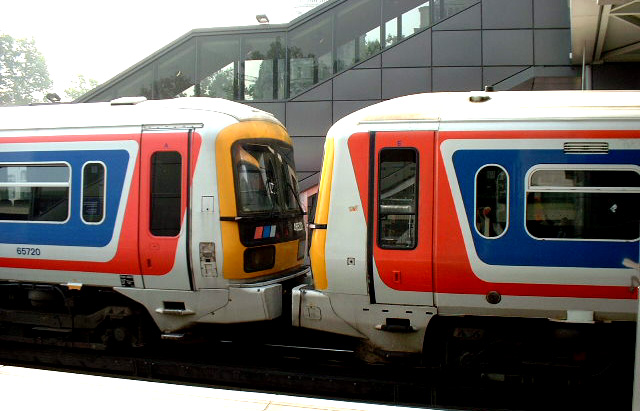
A Metro-Cammell unit (left) coupled cab-to-cab with a BREL unit (right). BREL-built units have air vents above some saloon windows; Metro-Cammell units do not

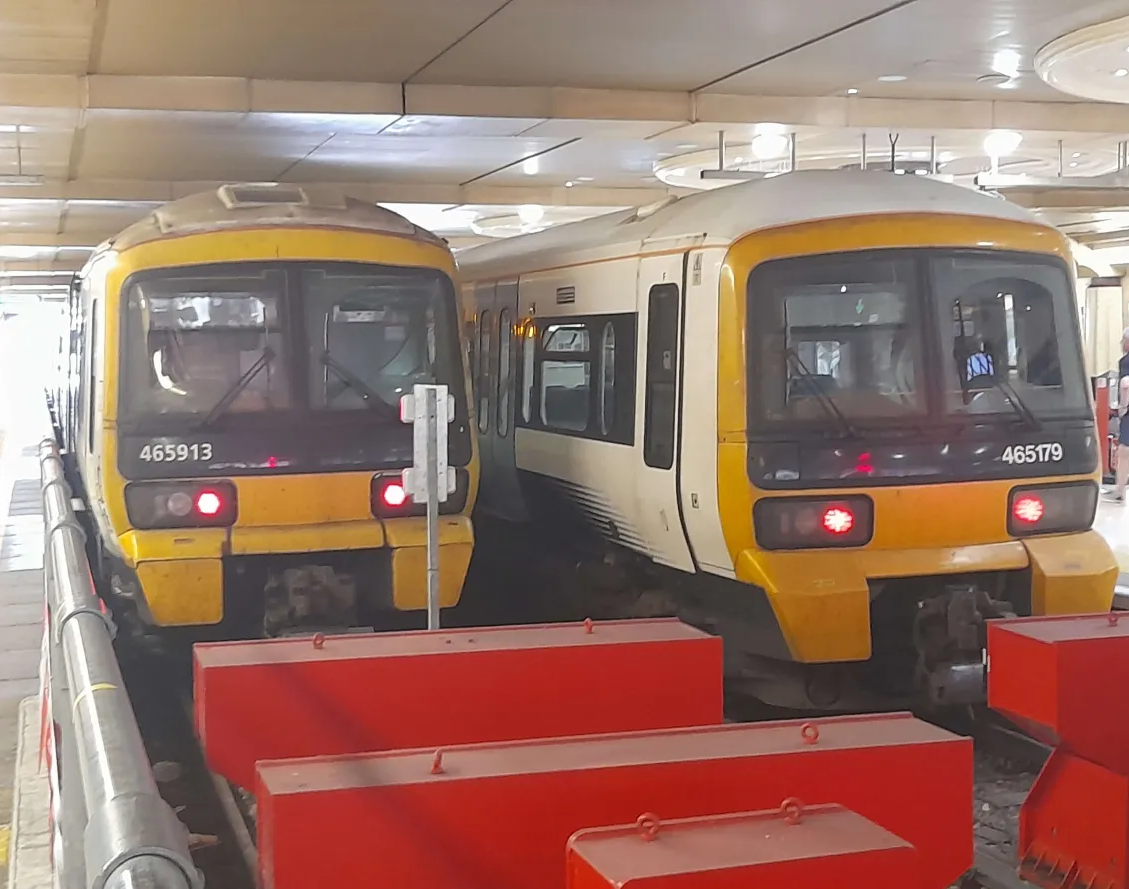
A refurbished 465/9 and a 465/1 at Charing Cross Station showing the difference in the roofs

Due to the size of the original order, British Rail approached two separate manufacturers to supply the new rolling stock. The first two sub-classes (designated 465/0 and 465/1) were built by BREL/ABB while the third sub-class (465/2) as well as the two-car (466) units were built by Metro-Cammell. Although built to the same specification and utilised interchangeably, there are subtle differences between the two fleets and they do not share common parts. The maximum speed of the Class 465 is 75 mph (120 km/h), and they are designed only for 750 V DC third rail operation. A Solid State Traction Converter package controls three-phase AC traction motors, which allows for rheostatic or regenerative dynamic braking. Primary braking system is electro-pneumatically actuated disc brakes, which is blended with the Dynamic brakes. Tachometers on every axle of the unit provide for Wheel Slip/Slide Protection.

== Traction equipment replacement ==
Plans were drawn up in 2007 to improve the reliability of the BREL and ABB units (Classes 465/0 and 465/1) by the installation of new traction equipment. The new package was developed and manufactured by Hitachi Rail. It was retrofitted across all 97 465/0 and 465/1 trains over the course of 2009/2010. Brush Traction, the supplier/manufacturer of the original traction equipment, worked as consultants to assist in retro-fitting the new equipment.

== Refurbishment ==
In 2005, the first 34 465/2 units (465201–465234) were given an extensive refurbishment at Doncaster Works. This included new interior panelling, new flooring, new lighting, new seat moquette (in the same grey and blue design as on the Class 375 Electrostars) and the addition of a new first class compartment at the front and rear of the units, plus many other changes. This was done to allow them to be moved to outer-suburban routes alongside the Class 375s. They would be replaced on inner suburban services by Class 376s. They were reclassified as a separate sub-fleet designated 465/9 (465901–465934) and replaced the remaining Class 423 slam-door stock. The last train in the original Network SouthEast livery was repainted in September 2007.

Between 2010 and 2012, all Class 465/0 and 465/1s had an overhaul by RailCare of their door systems, air systems, couplings and trailer bogies. It was also at this time that all of the seats were given a retrim in Southeastern current mauve and blue seat moquette.

A further refresh of the entire Class 465 fleet took place gradually from 2016. This included the installation of new wheelchair spaces and fully accessible toilets, more handrails, and tactile floor surfaces in the vestibule areas, and louder, more audible door alarms. This was done in order to maintain RVAR (Railway Vehicle Accessibility Regulations) compliance. The Metro-Cammell units also had new doors fitted.

In 2025, unit 465908 was re-painted into Network SouthEast livery and named after Chris Green, the former managing director of Network South East. This was done as part of celebrations marking the 200th anniversary of modern railways.

On 23 December 2025 Alstom announced it had signed a contract with Eversholt Rail to overhaul the remainder of Southeastern's Class 465 fleet.

== Fleet details ==
Units:
Class	Operator	Qty.	Year built	Cars per unit	Manufacturer	Unit nos.	Notes
465/0	Southeastern	47	1991–1993	4	BREL/ABB	465001–465004, 465006-465031, 465034–465044, 465046-465050	Includes 465301, built in 1992 as demonstrator for the Universal Networker;
465/0	Stored	1	1991–1993	4	BREL/ABB	465045	
465/0	Scrapped	2	1991–1993	4	BREL/ABB	465005, 465032	
465/1	Southeastern	44	1993–1994	4	ABB	465151–465168, 465170-465174, 465176-465187, 465189-465197	
465/1	Stored	2	1993–1994	4	ABB	465169, 465175	
465/1	Scrapped	1	1993–1994	4	ABB	465188	
465/2	Stored	4	1991–1993	4	Metro-Cammell	465235, (Note: Only vehicles 65734 and 65784 remain of 465235.) 465241–465242, 465247	
465/2	Scrapped	12	1991–1993	4	Metro-Cammell	465235-465240, (Note: Vehicles 72787 and 72788 of 465235 scrapped.) 465243–465246, 465248–465249, 465250	
465/9	Southeastern	25	1991–1993	4	Metro-Cammell	465901–465904, 465906–465914, 465916, 465919, 465922–465930, 465932	Converted from 465/2 units (465201–465234)
465/9	Scrapped	9	1991–1993	4	Metro-Cammell	465905, 465915, 465917-465918, 465920-465921, 465931, 465933-465934	Converted from 465/2 units (465201–465234)

=== Named units ===
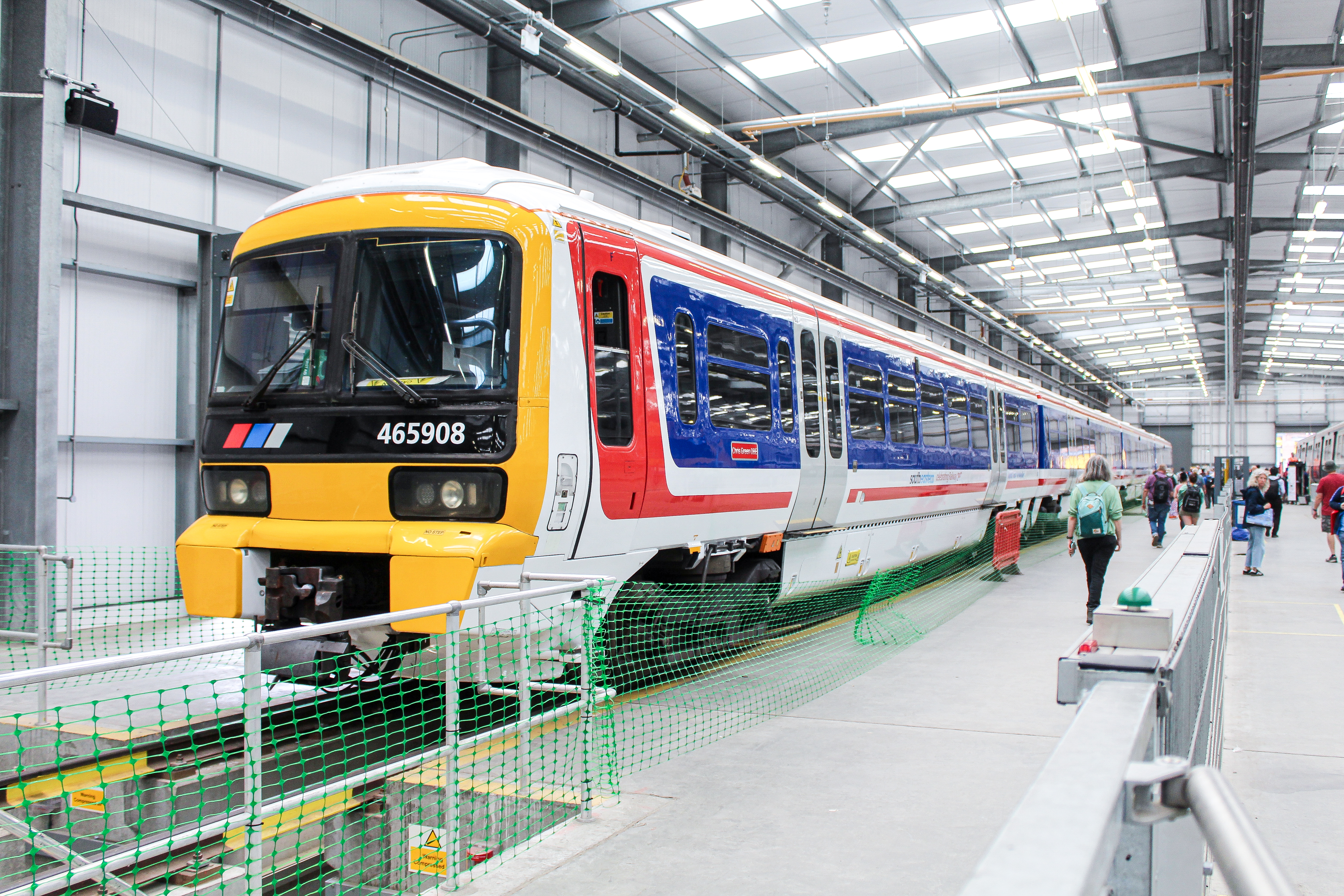
465908 Chris Green OBE in Network SouthEast livery at the Greatest Gathering, Derby in 2025

Unit 465908 was repainted in Network SouthEast livery in February 2025 as part of Railway 200 celebrations. The unit is named Chris Green.

=== Vehicle numbers ===
Vehicle number ranges:
Class	Motor vehicles	Trailer vehicles
465/0	64759–64858	72028–72172
465/1	65800–65893	72900–72993
465/2	65734–65749, 65784–65799	72787–72818
465/9	65700–65733, 65750–65783	72719–72786

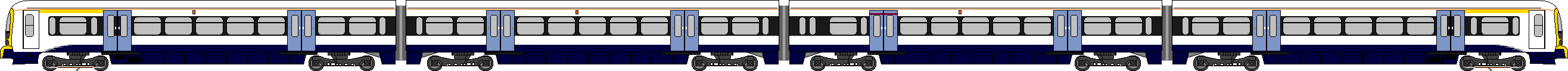
Illustration of a Southeastern Class 465/9 unit
