= Cannon Street station =

London railway and Underground station

Cannon Street
- London Cannon Street
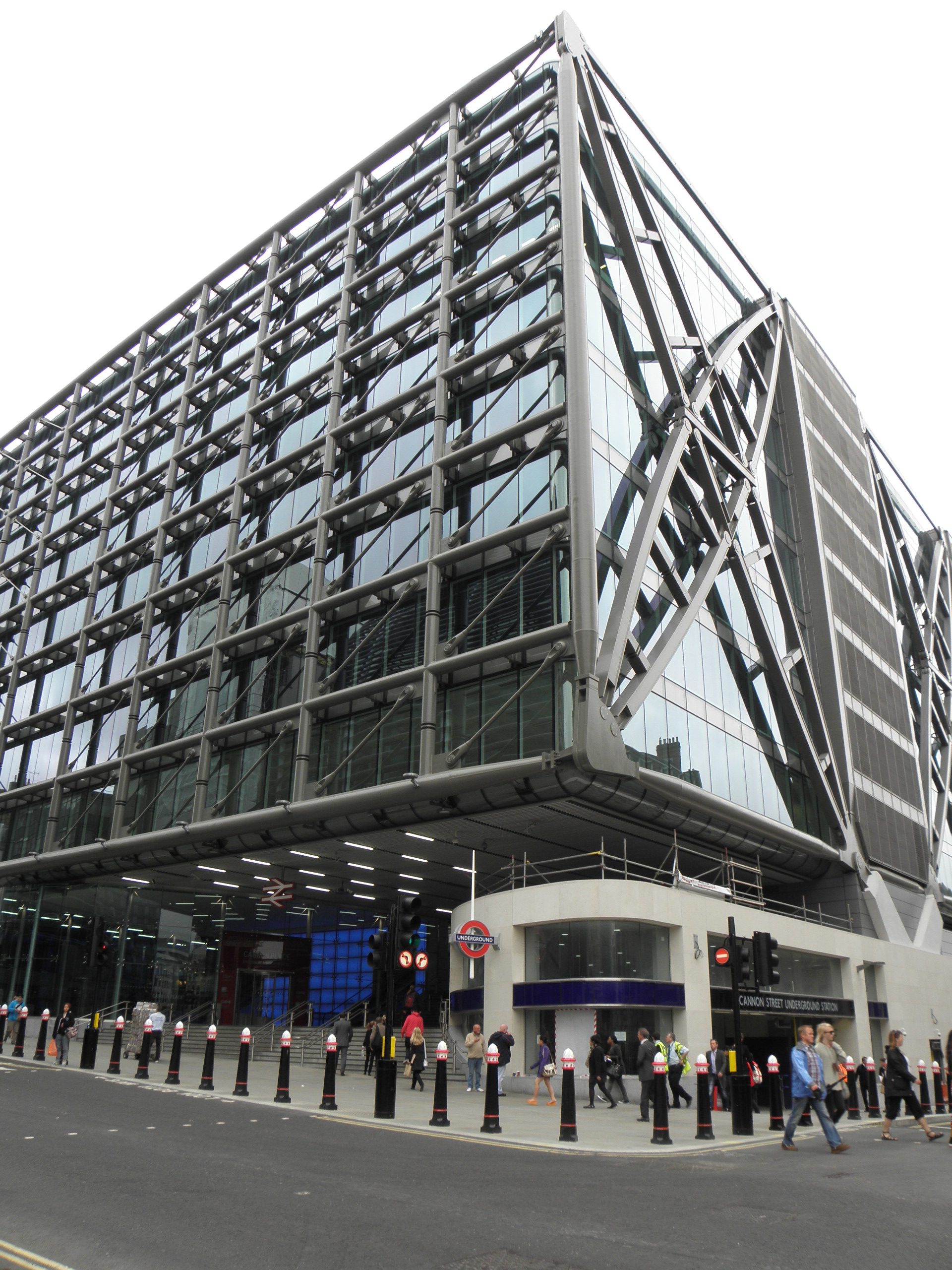
- Main entrance
- Interactive map of Cannon Street

General information
- Location: Cannon Street
- Local authority: City of London
- Grid reference: TQ326808
- Managed by: Network Rail
- Station code: CST
- DfT category: A
- Number of platforms: 7
- Accessible: Yes
- Fare zone: 1
- OSI: Bank

National Rail annual entry and exit
- 2020–21: ▼2.684 million
- 2021–22: ▲7.024 million
- 2022–23: ▼6.723 million
- 2023–24: ▲7.102 million
- Interchange: 0.294 million
- 2024–25: ▲7.508 million
- Interchange: ▼0.258 million

Railway companies
- Original company: South Eastern Railway
- Pre-grouping: South Eastern and Chatham Railway
- Post-grouping: Southern Railway

Key dates
- 1 September 1866: Opened
- 5 June 1926: Closed
- 28 June 1926: Reopened
- 5 August 1974: Closed
- 9 September 1974: Reopened

Other information
- External links: Departures; Facilities
- Coordinates: 51.5104°N 0.0907°W

Cannon Street station, also known as London Cannon Street, is a central London railway terminus and connected London Underground station in London fare zone 1 located on Cannon Street in the City of London and managed by Network Rail. It is one of two London termini of the South Eastern Main Line, the other being Charing Cross, while the London Underground station is on the Circle and District lines, between Mansion House and Monument stations. The station runs services by Southeastern, mostly catering for commuters in southeast London and Kent, with occasional services further into the latter.

The station was built on a site of the medieval Steelyard, the trading base in England of the Hanseatic League. It was built by the South Eastern Railway in order to have a railway terminal in the City and compete with the rival London, Chatham and Dover Railway. This required a new bridge across the River Thames, which was constructed between 1863 and 1866. The station was initially a stop for continental services from Charing Cross, and that route was convenient for travel between the City and the West End, until the construction of the District Railway. It remained popular with commuters, though its off-peak services were discontinued in the early 20th century, leading to it being closed on Sundays for almost 100 years. The original hotel on the station was unsuccessful, and eventually closed. The station was controversially renovated in the late 1950s by John Poulson, while further construction on top of the station building occurred during the City's 1980s property boom. The Poulson building was replaced in 2007 as part of a general renovation of the station to make it more accessible. As part of the Thameslink Programme development in the 2010s, it was re-opened on Sundays and began to offer more long-distance services in place of Charing Cross.

== Location ==
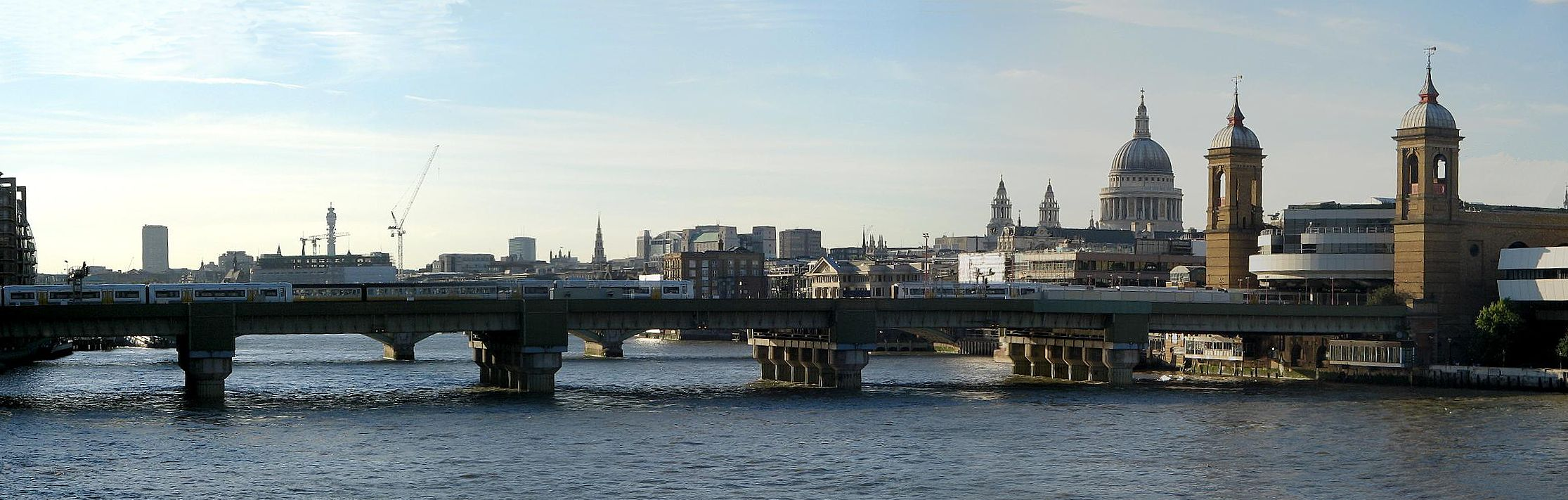
Cannon Street Railway Bridge, 2005

Cannon Street is a terminal station, approached across the River Thames by the Cannon Street Railway Bridge. Its approach by rail is through a triangular connection to both London Bridge and Charing Cross. It is one of eighteen stations in the country that are managed by Network Rail.

There were originally eight platforms; a refurbishment in the late 1990s removed the original platform 1. It has entrances on Cannon Street itself and Dowgate Hill. It is located near London Stone (to the north of the station).

London Buses routes 15 and 17 and night routes N15 and N199 serve the station.

== History ==
=== Original structure ===
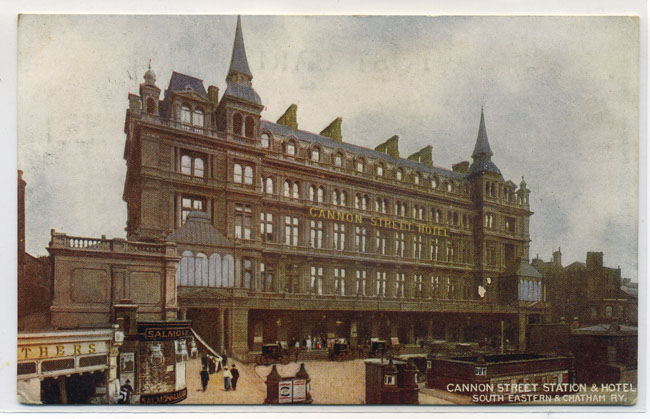
Front of original station building, c. 1910

Cannon Street station was built on a site where the Hanseatic merchants' Steelyard had been based from the 10th century until 1598. The site was proposed in 1860 by the South Eastern Railway (SER) in response to its rival, the London, Chatham & Dover Railway (LC&DR), extending a line into the City of London as far north as Ludgate Hill. The SER had already made plans to extend its line towards Charing Cross, but decided that it should complement this with a terminus in the City.

In 1861, the company obtained an act of Parliament for a station in Cannon Street, a short distance from Mansion House and the Bank of England. In addition to taking traffic from the LC&DR, the new station would provide a direct railway link between the City and the West End, over which a journey could be made in a fraction of the time taken travelling by road. The approach was a 60-chain (4,000 ft; 1,200 m) branch of the line to Charing Cross, west of London Bridge. Work started on the station and its approach in July 1863. The construction work was undertaken by Lucas Brothers.

The station was opened on 1 September 1866 at a cost of £4 million (now £412 million). The original building was designed by Sir John Hawkshaw and John Wolfe-Barry and was characterised by its two Christopher Wren-style towers, 23 ft (7.0 m) square and 135 ft (41 m) high, which faced on to the River Thames. The towers supported an iron train shed, 700 ft (210 m) long and crowned by a high single arch, almost semicircular, of glass and iron. The station is carried over Upper Thames Street on a brick viaduct, 700 ft (210 m) long and containing 27 million bricks. Below this viaduct exist the remains of a number of Roman buildings, which form a scheduled monument. The bridge was open to pedestrians between 1872 and 1877; they paid a toll of ½d.

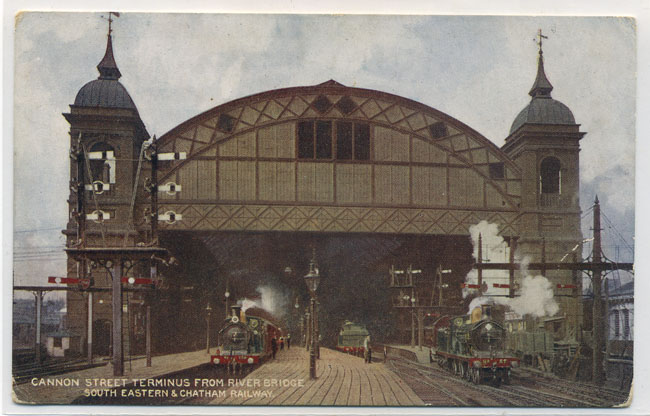
Original station viewed from the railway bridge, c. 1910

The five-storey City Terminus Hotel, which fronted the station, was opened in May 1867. It was an Italianate style hotel and forecourt, designed by E. M. Barry, and it provided many of the station's passenger facilities, as well as an appropriate architectural frontispiece to the street. This arrangement was very similar to that put in place at Charing Cross. The hotel was also built by Lucas Brothers. The hotel was not profitable, and was over £47,000 (now £4,837,000) in debt by 1870. The City Terminus Hotel was renamed the Cannon Street Hotel in 1879. In July 1920, the hotel was the venue for the Foundation Congress of the Communist Party of Great Britain. Most of the hotel was closed in 1931, but the public rooms were kept open for meetings. The rest were converted into offices and renamed Southern House. The hotel is referred to in The Fire Sermon section of T. S. Eliot's The Waste Land.

Upon its opening Cannon Street station was a stopping point for all services to and from Charing Cross, including boat trains to Continental Europe. A shuttle service between the two stations ran every 20 minutes and became a popular way of travelling between the City and the West End. However, the opening of the District Railway as far as Blackfriars caused traffic to decline, and its extension to Mansion House the following year reduced it further. The SER's route could not compete with the Underground, which was more direct and reliable, but suburban traffic to Cannon Street remained significant, and the bridge was widened to 120 feet (37 m) in the late 1880s, allowing ten tracks with sidings. The rebuilt bridge was opened on 13 February 1892. The signal boxes outside the station were upgraded the following year.

The SER merged with the LC&DR in 1899 to form the South Eastern and Chatham Railway (SECR). The following year, the station was earmarked for part-time closures as it relied primarily on business travel, but this was rejected. A further proposal was a monorail running between London Bridge and Cannon Street, at an estimated cost of £100,000; this was also abandoned. The London and Southwestern Railway (LSWR) became interested in using Cannon Street as a terminus, as it would allow a connection between Waterloo and the City.

=== War and inter-war years ===
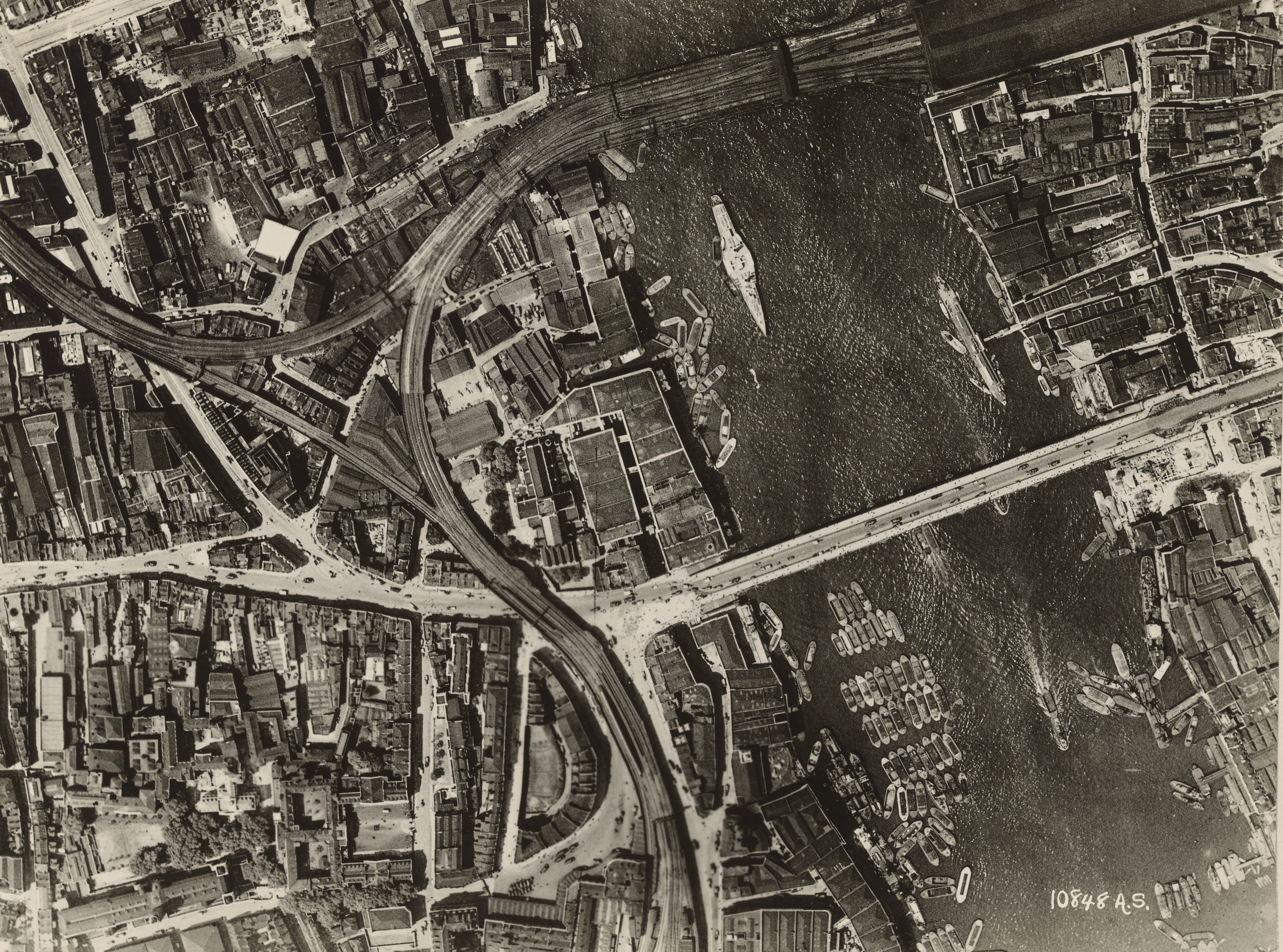
Aerial view, 1920s

Work on strengthening the bridge, by the addition of six new 443-foot (135 m) girders in between the existing ones, was completed in 1913.

Most Cannon Street train services ceased during World War I. Continental boat trains were stopped on 15 November 1914 and rerouted to Victoria. The station stopped being served by through services from Charing Cross on 31 December 1916, and was closed on Sundays. Services were reduced further on 1 May 1918, when it was closed after 3 p.m. on Saturdays and between 11 a.m. and 4 p.m. Mondays to Fridays. This allowed Cannon Street to be used as a goods depot for war supplies.

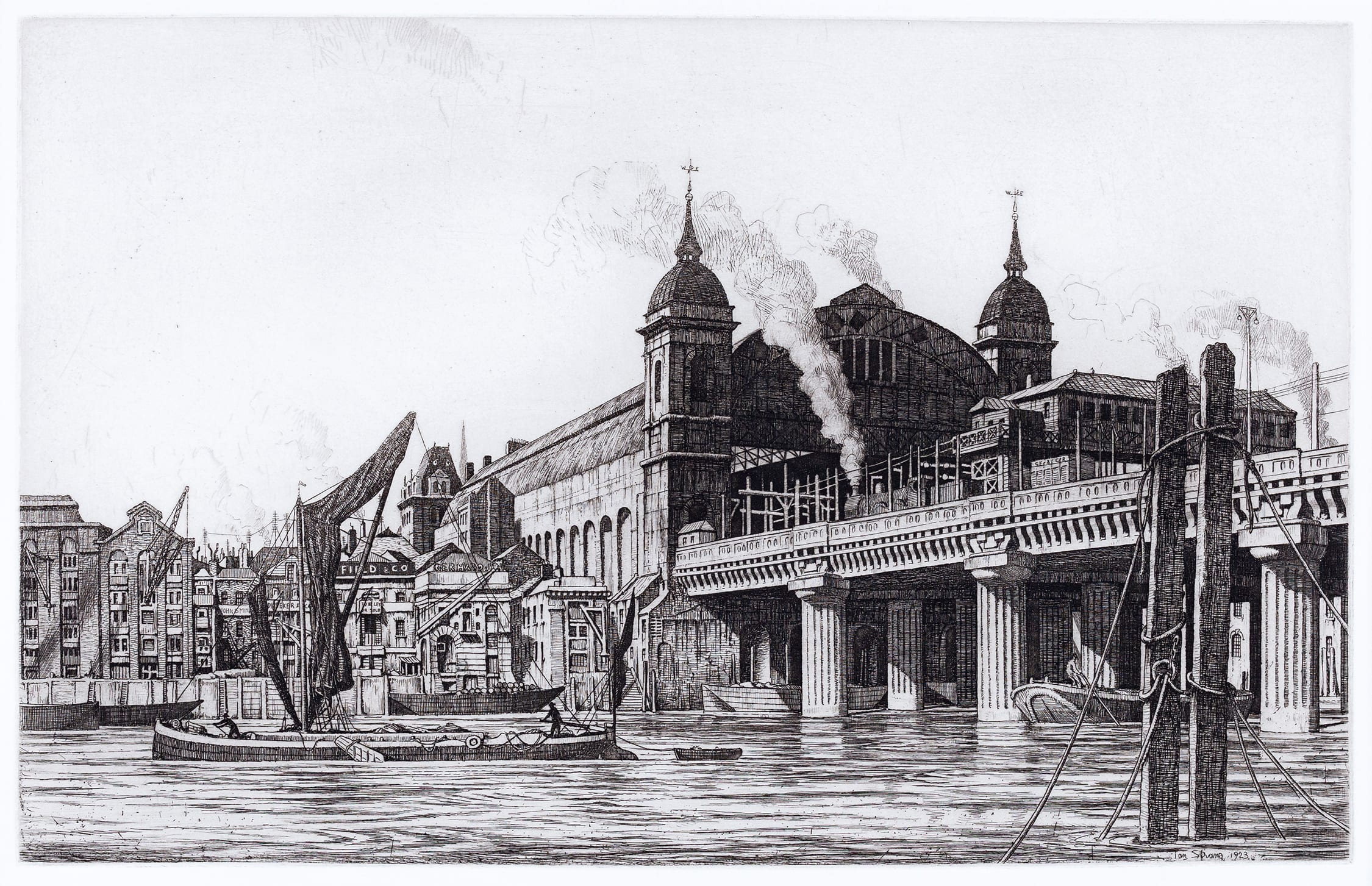
The station in 1923, in an etching by Ian Strang

Between 5 and 28 June 1926, the station was closed to allow the Southern Railway to carry out various works, including the rebuilding of the platforms, relaying of the tracks and installation of a new system of electrical signalling – the four-aspect colour light scheme. The station was also renovated and the glass roof cleaned. The number of platforms was reduced from nine to eight, with five set aside for the new electric trains. The signal box spanning the width of the railway bridge was removed. In July 1939, Cannon Street was closed for a week following a fire in Borough Market which prevented any trains accessing it.

The station, which had been subject to structural neglect prior to World War II, suffered extensive bomb damage and was hit by several incendiary devices which damaged the roof. In 1943 a high explosive also hit platform 8. The original glass roof had been removed before the war, in an attempt to save it; however, the factory in which the roof was stored was itself badly bombed, destroying the roof.

=== Redevelopment ===
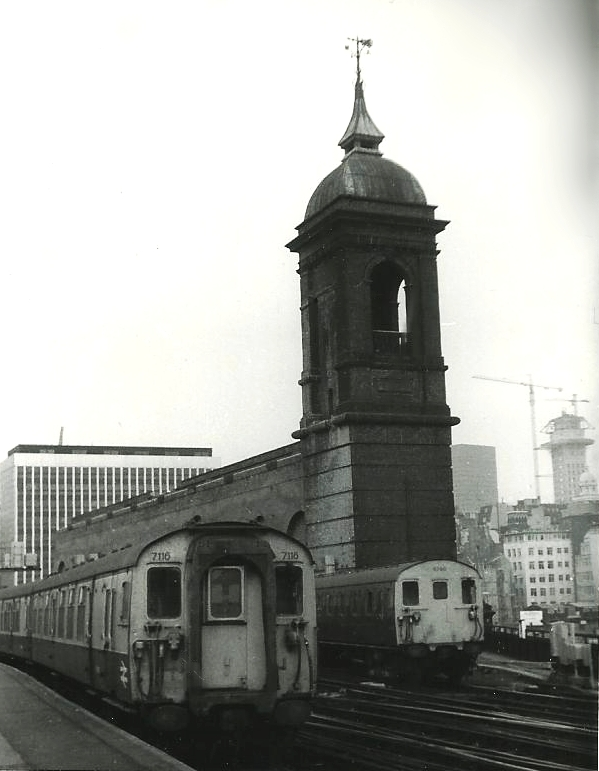
Cannon Street station in 1969, showing the easterly of the twin towers

Following nationalisation of the railways in 1948, the station was managed by the Southern Region of British Railways. The station's prime location coupled with the property boom of the 1950s and the need for British Rail to seek alternative revenue streams made war-damaged Cannon Street a key target for property developers. Steam trains stopped running from Cannon Street in 1961

Various plans were mooted for the reconstruction of the station, from the installation of a new ticket hall and concourse under Southern House in 1955 as part of British Rail's Modernisation Plan to the construction of a car park estimated to cost £125,000 (now £2,843,000) and even a helipad. (Note: The preferred site was the old Nine Elms goods yard in Battersea) In 1962, the British Transport Commission entered into an agreement with Town & Country Properties for the construction of a multi-storey office building above the station with 154,000 sq ft (14,300 m^{2}) of floor space. The cost of the development was £2.35 million (now £40 million) and it was scheduled for completion by June 1965.

In preparation for redevelopment, the remains of the train shed roof had been demolished in 1958, and Barry's hotel (which had been used as offices since 1931) soon followed in 1960. The architect selected to design the new building was John Poulson who was good friends with Graham Tunbridge, a British Rail surveyor whom he had met during the war. Poulson took advantage of this friendship to win contracts for the redevelopment of various British Rail termini. He paid Tunbridge a weekly income of £25 and received in return building contracts, including the rebuilding of Waterloo and East Croydon stations. At his trial in 1974, Poulson admitted that, shortly before receiving the Cannon Street building contract, he had given Tunbridge a cheque for £200 and a suit worth £80. Poulson was later found guilty of corruption charges and given a seven-year concurrent sentence; Tunbridge received a 15-month suspended sentence and a £4,000 fine for his role in the affair.

All that now remains of the original station architecture are the twin 120 ft (37 m) yellow brick towers at the country-end and parts of the low flanking walls.

=== Modern era ===
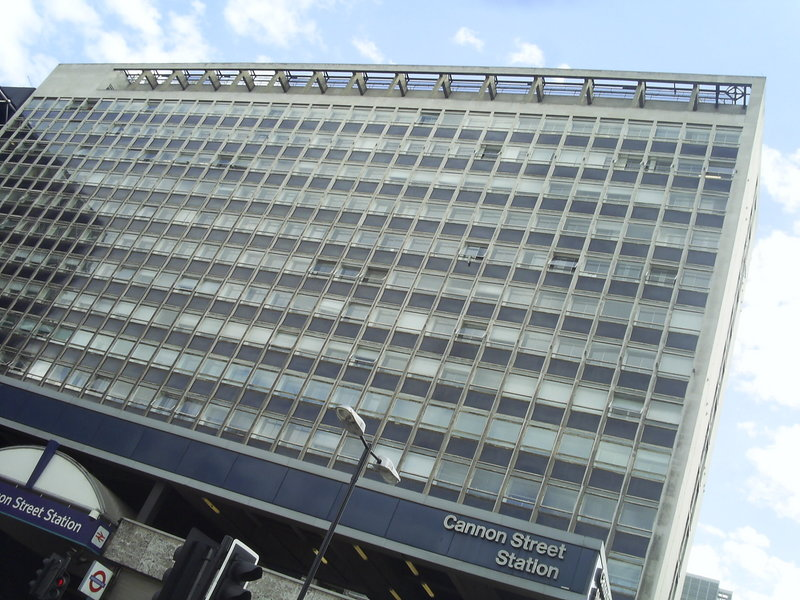
John Poulson's office block in 2007 prior to redevelopment

The station's twin brick towers were listed Grade II in 1972. In 1974, the station was closed for five weeks from 2 August to 9 September to enable alterations to be made to the track and the approaches to London Bridge to be resignalled. Traffic was diverted to London Bridge, Charing Cross and Blackfriars. On 4 March 1976, a Provisional Irish Republican Army (IRA) bomb of about 10 lb (4.5 kg) exploded on an empty commuter train leaving Cannon Street, injuring eight people on another train travelling alongside. (Note: Had the bomb exploded 13 minutes earlier it would have caused widespread carnage as the train had been carrying hundreds of commuters on a service from Sevenoaks.)

On 15 February 1984, it was reported in The Times that Cannon Street was to close. At the time, the station had been closed for weekends and evenings, and the publication of British Rail's new timetable for 1984–1985 revealed that it would lose all its direct off-peak services to the south-east. Services from Sevenoaks, Orpington, Hayes, Dartford, Sidcup, Bexleyheath, Woolwich, Lewisham and Greenwich would instead terminate at London Bridge except during peak hours. This was denied by British Rail (Southern)'s manager David Kirby, who pointed out that it had invested £10 million in redecking the railway bridge, and that passengers travelling from the south-east during off-peak hours would most likely be visiting the West End and not the City.

In 1986, the twin towers were restored in a project costing £242,000 (now £2,866,000). The works revealed that the east tower still contained a large water tank which was used during the days of steam traction to replenish locomotives and to power the station's hydraulic systems. The brickwork was repaired, cleaned and repointed, and the weather vanes gilded to complement the dome of nearby St Paul's Cathedral. This work was one of the Railway Heritage Trust's first projects and coincided with an exhibition held in the station in August of the same year to mark its 150th anniversary.

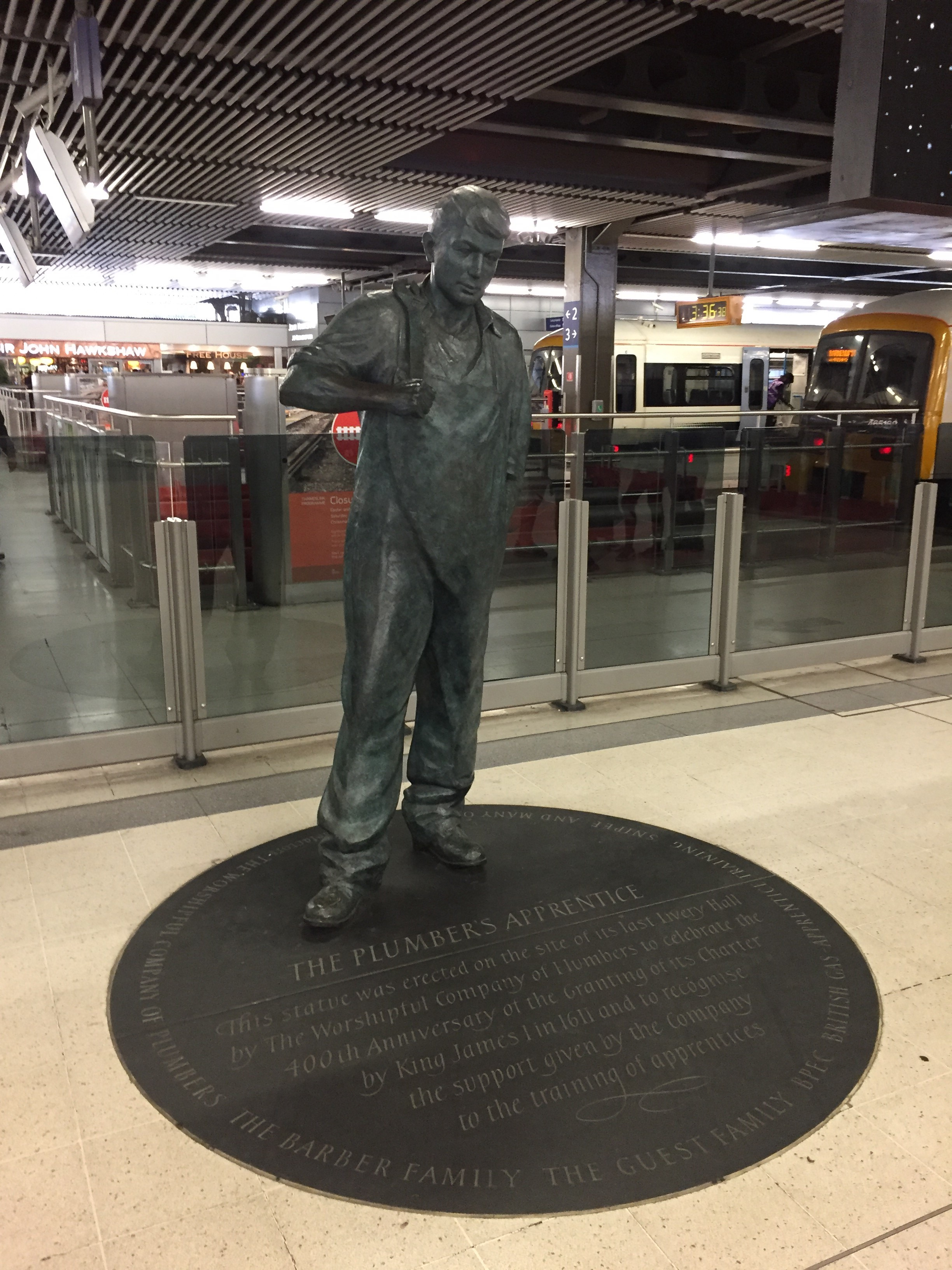
The Plumber's Apprentice by Martin Jennings, unveiled in 2011 to mark the 400th anniversary of the Worshipful Company of Plumbers whose Guild Hall was demolished to make way for the station.

In the 1980s, there was another property boom and British Rail again began looking into further commercial uses of the Cannon Street landspace, including 500,000 square feet (46,000 m^{2}) of office space. The air rights over the platforms to the rear of Poulson's office were sold to Speyhawk which appointed Bovis Construction to build a free-standing structure comprising two office blocks on a 6,000 tonne steel deck constructed over the station's eight platforms. The Cannons Club, a sports club, was founded beneath the station's arches around this time, and quickly became one of the most prestigious squash clubs in the country. InterCity, the high-speed arm of British Rail, subsequently sponsored the National Squash Championships and National Squash Challenge.

The larger office block, the "Atrium building", provides 190,000 sq ft (18,000 m^{2}) of office space on six floors and is linked to the smaller building, the "River building", via a glazed link raised through a central glazed atrium. The River building, which has two storeys, is built on the steel deck and contained within the station's two flank walls, which were rebuilt, providing 95,000 sq ft (8,800 m^{2}) of office space. This building projects slightly beyond the restored twin towers which form the riverside boundary to the development. The Atrium building was later let to the London International Financial Futures and Options Exchange (Liffe). The River building has a 1 acre (0.40 ha) roof garden. The project cost around £500,000 and was laid to comply with planning restrictions which required the building to be low and flat to maintain the sight lines from St Paul's to Tower Bridge.

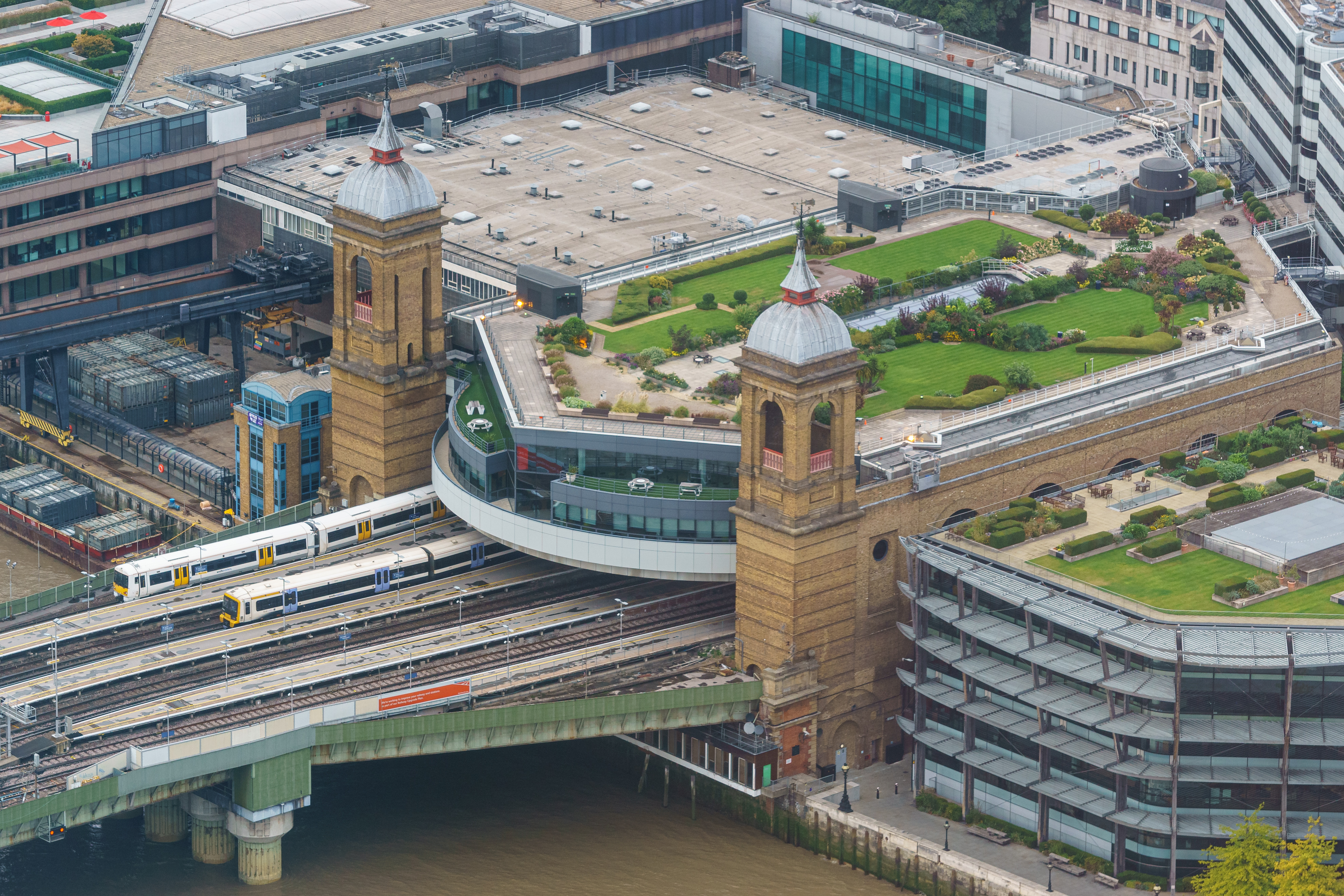
Cannon Street station seen from The Shard, showing roof garden and twin towers

Planning permission was granted in March 2007 to replace the Poulson building, with a new air rights building designed by Foggo Associates. Hines, the US developer, led a £360 million project involving the demolition of Poulson's office block, replacing it with a mixed-use development containing more than 400,000 sq ft (37,000 m^{2}) of office space alongside 17,000 sq ft (1,600 m^{2}) of station retail space. The redevelopment was part of a larger regeneration programme undertaken by Network Rail to modernise and "unlock the commercial potential" of the main London termini; Euston and London Bridge were also redeveloped. Network Rail's director of commercial property said that the finished station would be "less congested and more accessible for passengers." Cannon Street won the award for "Major Station of the Year" at the 2013 National Rail Awards.

In January 2015, the station's opening hours were extended to 0500–0100 Monday to Sunday (prior to this, the station had been closed on Sundays and during the evenings), and several services which previously terminated at Charing Cross were diverted to Cannon Street as a result of Thameslink Programme works. Some of these services reverted to terminating at Charing Cross following the completion of the works, while services from the Greenwich line and from New Cross and St Johns will permanently run to Cannon Street due to the removal of the Spa Road Junction.

== National Rail ==
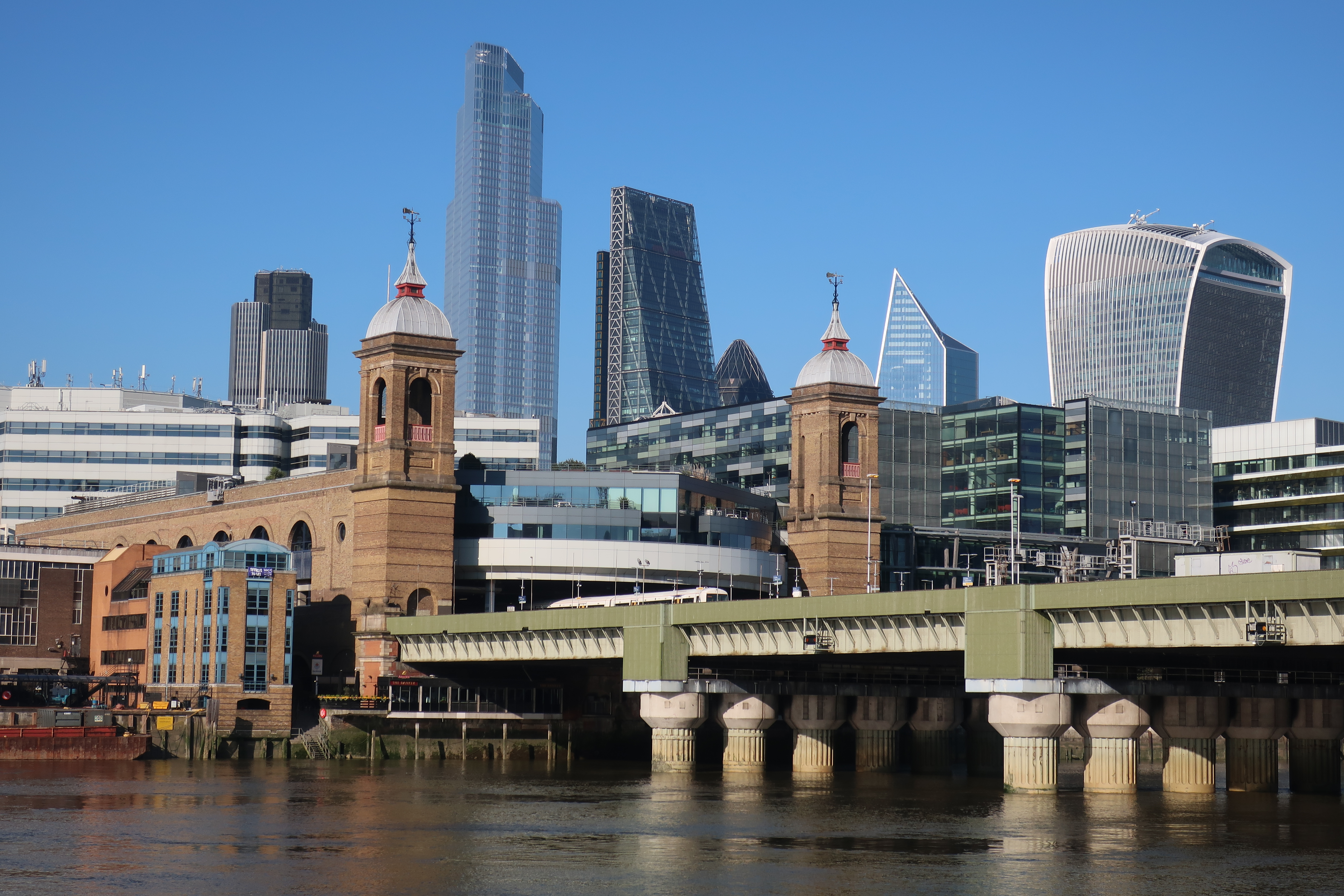
The station viewed from the south bank of the Thames, 2020

The station connects the south side of the City to south and south-east London via London Bridge station. Some services run directly into Cannon Street from Kent and East Sussex, but generally only during peak hours. Occasionally during the weekends when track maintenance is in progress, the station serves as an intermediate station between London Bridge and Charing Cross. Either trains reverse at the station or rail passengers change trains here. From 1918 to 2015, the station was closed on Sundays; this changed with Southeastern's introduction of a new timetable from January 2015 which resulted in the station's opening hours being extended over the entire week, except when engineering works require its closure and most services can be diverted to Charing Cross. In the same way, many trains can be diverted to Cannon Street if engineering works affect Charing Cross.

=== Services ===
All services at London Cannon Street are operated by Southeastern.

The typical off-peak service in trains per hour (tph) is:

- 2 tph to Orpington via Grove Park
- 2 tph to Slade Green via Bexleyheath, returning to London Cannon Street via Woolwich Arsenal and Greenwich
- 2 tph to Slade Green via Greenwich and Woolwich Arsenal, returning to London Cannon Street via Bexleyheath
- 2 tph to Dartford via Lewisham and Woolwich Arsenal

During peak hours, there are also additional services to Ashford International, Tunbridge Wells, Hastings and Ore, and to Ramsgate and Dover Priory via Chatham.

=== Accidents and incidents ===
- On 26 December 1867, seven passengers and three train crew members were injured when, "during a very thick fog", a train arriving at Cannon Street from Greenwich collided with another from Waterloo due to a signaller's error.
- On 27 June 1914, one person was killed and 20 were injured in a collision and subsequent derailment at Cannon Street. A train departing for Hastings was in a side-long collision with a train arriving, across its path, from Plumstead and, although the collision occurred at low speed, part of the Plumstead service was derailed and one of its carriages overturned. The driver of the Plumstead service was blamed for a failure to observe, and a misreading of, signals which took his train into the path of the Hastings-bound service. An investigation found the man who died was likely leaning out of the window at the moment his carriage overturned, and he might have avoided serious injury had he been seated.
- On 16 July 1919, 75 people were injured or left shaken when a train arriving from Dartford hit the buffers at the end of Cannon Street's platform seven. Twelve of the injured required hospital treatment. A Board of Trade report into the incident blamed "an error of judgment" on the driver's part while he was braking on his approach to the platform end.
- On 11 May 1941, the station was bombed in a Luftwaffe air raid. SR V class 4-4-0 No. 934 St. Lawrence was severely damaged.
- On 20 March 1951, a diesel electric multiple unit and an electric multiple unit were in a side-long collision when the driver of the latter misread signals.
- On 5 April 1957, the signal box was destroyed by a fire due to an electrical fault. The station was consequently put out of action. Using hand signals, a skeleton service was put in place on 8 April. A temporary signal box was erected which came into operation on 5 May. Steam locomotives were temporarily banned from using the station, with Hastings Units being introduced into service earlier than planned. A full service was resumed from 6 May. Construction of a new signal box began on 19 April and it came into service on 16 December.
- On 20 March 1961, a side-long collision and partial derailment resulted in injury to 12 people aboard an arriving service whose driver inadvertently passed a red signal and ran into an empty train as it left Cannon Street.
- On 4 March 1976, a bomb exploded on an empty electric multiple unit at the station. Eight people in an adjacent train were injured.
- On 20 August 1989, the Marchioness pleasure boat sank close to Cannon Street Railway Bridge, killing 51 people.
- On 8 January 1991, two people were killed and hundreds were injured when an electric multiple unit failed to stop on a dead-end platform and collided with the buffers.

== London Underground ==
Cannon Street
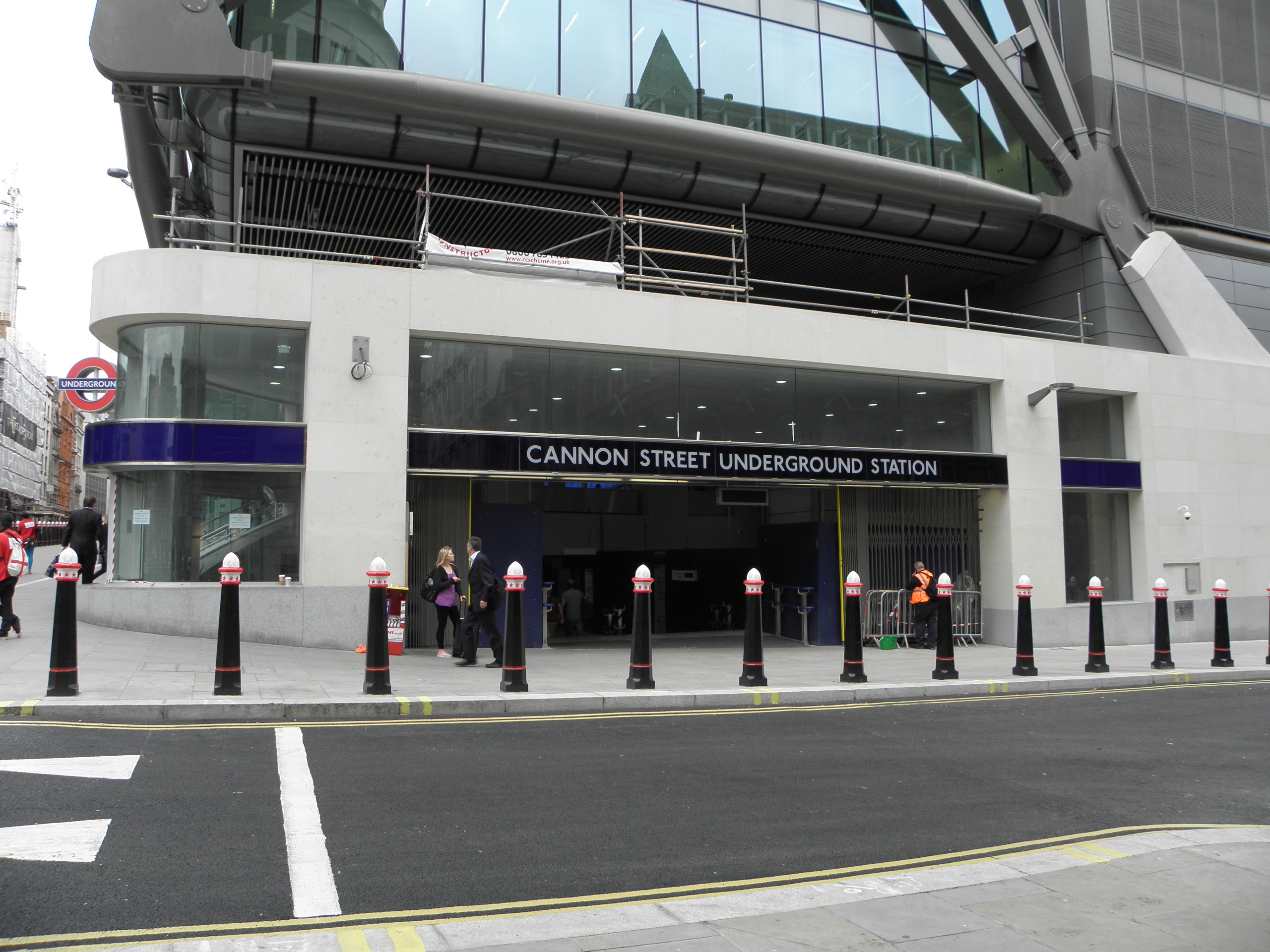
- Entrance from Dowgate Hill

General information
- Location: Cannon Street
- Local authority: City of London
- Managed by: London Underground
- Number of platforms: 2
- Accessible: Yes(Westbound only)
- Fare zone: 1

London Underground annual entry and exit
- 2021: ▲2.15 million
- 2022: ▲3.79 million
- 2023: ▲3.84 million
- 2024: ▲4.13 million
- 2025: ▲4.39 million

Key dates
- 1884: Opened (MICCR)

Other information
- External links: TfL station info page

The London Underground station is sub-surface, situated immediately below the main line station. It is served by the District and Circle lines. Entrances are located on Cannon Street, Dowgate Hill, and on the main line concourse upstairs at the National Rail station, providing an interconnection for commuters. Since 2018, out of station interchange has been permitted between Cannon Street and Bank stations.

=== History ===
By 1876, the Metropolitan Railway (MR) and District Railway (DR) had constructed the majority of the Inner Circle (now the Circle line), reaching Aldgate and Mansion House respectively. The companies were in dispute over the completion of the route as the DR was struggling financially and the MR was concerned that completion would affect its revenues through increased competition from the DR in the City area. In 1874, city financiers who were keen to see the line completed established the Metropolitan Inner Circle Completion Railway (MICCR) to link Mansion House to Aldgate. Forced into action, the MR bought out the company, and it and the DR began construction of the final section of the Inner Circle in 1879.

On 6 October 1884, the final section of the Inner Circle was opened, along with Cannon Street station. Initially, the station was served by trains of both companies as part of the circular Inner Circle service, but various operational patterns have been used during the station's life. The Inner Circle service achieved a separate identity as the Circle line in 1949, although its trains were still provided by the District or Metropolitan lines.

A station here was part of the abandoned phase two expansion of the Fleet line (now Jubilee line). It had originally been planned in 1943, and was revived as a major transport plan in 1965. London Transport spent £10m (now £118m) in 1972 safeguarding the route underneath Cannon Street and building reinforcements for laying a tube in the water-bearing ground around the station. The plan was abandoned in the early 1980s in favour of the current extension further south.

The Underground station underwent major reconstruction at the same time as the main line station, with the work being completed in 2012. From 14 December 2014, the station's opening hours changed significantly, with the station opening on Sundays and no longer closing early in the evenings. The station previously had restricted opening hours because it primarily served the local financial services sector, so there was low demand for services outside office hours. However, with the main line station's opening hours being extended due to the Thameslink Programme, the Underground station's opening hours were changed to accommodate the additional passengers.

Preceding station	London Underground	Following station
Mansion House towards Edgware Road via Victoria	Circle line	Monument towards Hammersmith via King's Cross St Pancras
Mansion House towards Wimbledon, Richmond or Ealing Broadway	District line	Monument towards Upminster
Preceding station	National Rail	Following station
Terminus	Southeastern South Eastern Main Line	London Bridge
Abandoned plans
Preceding station	London Underground	Following station
Ludgate Circus towards Stanmore	Jubilee line Phase 2 (never constructed)	Fenchurch Street towards New Cross Gate or Lewisham
