= London & South Eastern Railway =

Former train operating company in South East England

Southeastern
- Logo (2006-2014) Logo (2014-2021)

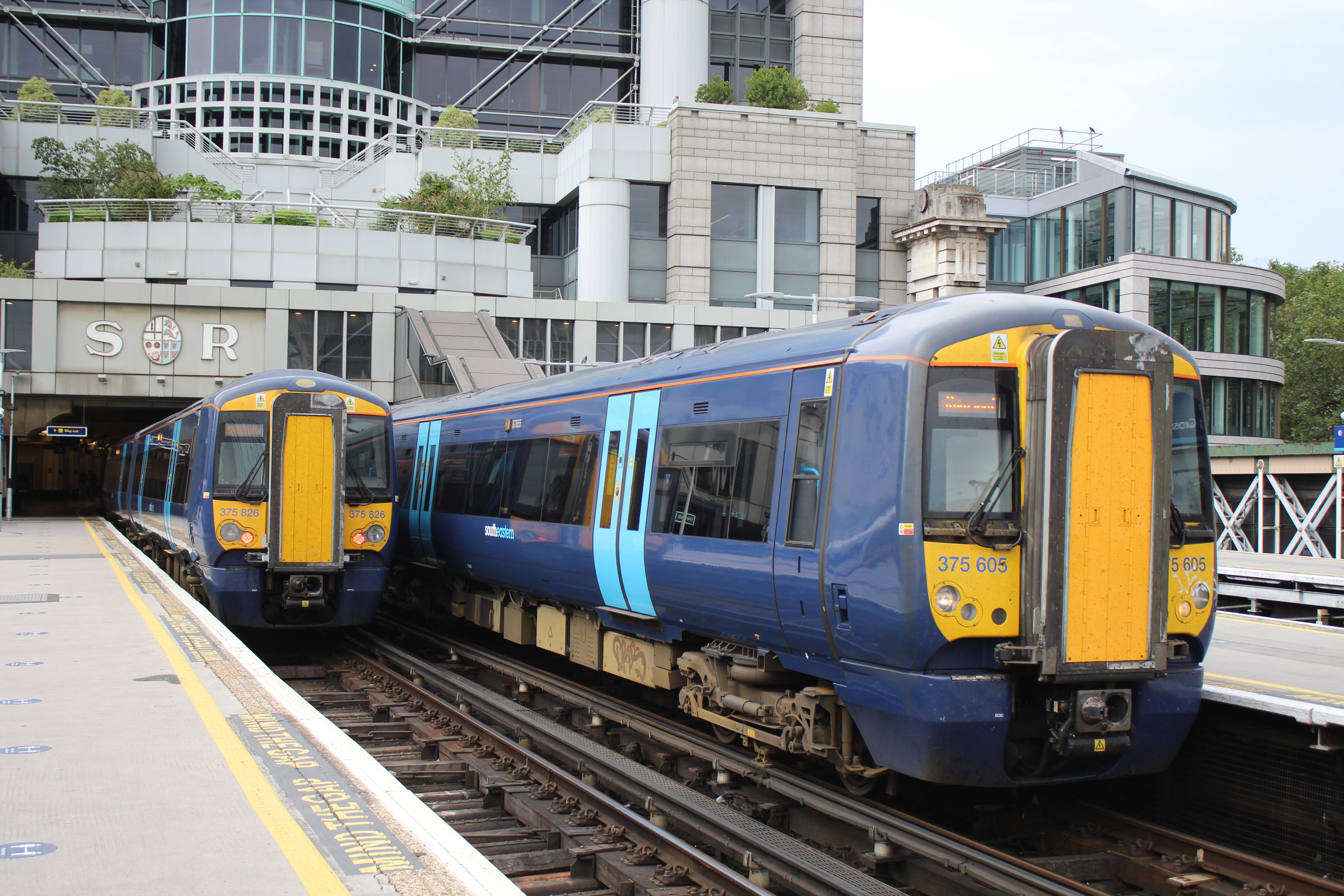

Overview
- Franchises: Integrated Kent; 1 April 2006 – 16 October 2021
- Main regions: Greater London, Kent
- Other region: East Sussex
- Fleet: Class 375 Electrostar; Class 376 Electrostar; Class 377 Electrostar; Class 395 Javelin; Class 465 Networker; Class 466 Networker; Class 707 Desiro City
- Stations called at: 180
- Stations operated: 164
- Parent company: Govia (joint venture between the Go-Ahead Group (owning 65%) and the French company Keolis (35%))
- Reporting mark: SE
- Predecessor: South Eastern Trains
- Successor: Southeastern (SE Trains Limited)

Other
- Website: www.southeasternrailway.co.uk
Route map

London & South Eastern Railway Limited, trading as Southeastern, was a British train operating company owned by Govia that operated passenger rail services in South East England. It was the key operator of commuter and regional services in South East London and Kent, and also served parts of East Sussex.

Southeastern commenced operations on 1 April 2006 as the franchisee for the new Integrated Kent franchise (IKF), replacing the state-owned South Eastern Trains on the former South Eastern franchise. Initially set to operate the franchise for a period of eight years, the company received numerous extensions and was at one point contracted to operate through to 2022. However, the franchise was terminated early after it was discovered that the company had held onto £25 million of unaccounted-for taxpayer money. On 16 October 2021, operations were transferred to the Department for Transport-owned operator Southeastern.

== Overview ==
Southeastern served the main London stations of Charing Cross, Victoria, Cannon Street, London Bridge, Waterloo East and St Pancras. The Southeastern network has a route mileage of 540, with 179 stations. About 70% of its services run to and from London.

Southeastern trains operated on three main routes: the South Eastern Main Line from London Cannon Street and London Charing Cross to Dover via Sevenoaks; the Chatham Main Line between London Victoria and Dover/Ramsgate via the Medway towns; and High Speed 1 from London St Pancras. On 14 December 2009, Southeastern launched full operations of its high-speed services using a purpose-built fleet of British Rail Class 395 high speed trains. Southeastern operated special high speed services using its Class 395s during the 2012 Summer Olympics and Paralympics under the Olympic Javelin brand.

Southeastern operated numerous commuter services that served South-East and South London as well as Kent, many of which came under the Metro brand. Between March 2009 and May 2012, due to substantial reconstruction work at London Blackfriars as part of the Thameslink Programme, Southeastern services that previously terminated at Blackfriars, mostly from Sevenoaks via the Catford loop, were extended to Kentish Town, St Albans, Luton or Bedford. During 2016, Transport for London (TfL) proposed to take over several Southeastern-ran commuter services within the city. However, the planned redistribution was not approved by the British government. Despite this decision, in the late 2010s, several services formerly operated by Southeastern were reorganised as Thameslink routes, including services to Sevenoaks and Gillingham.

It was owned by Govia, a joint venture between Go-Ahead Group and Keolis, which also operates the neighbouring Southern franchise that overlapped with Southeastern in some western areas.

== History ==
Map of the Southeastern network (click to expand)

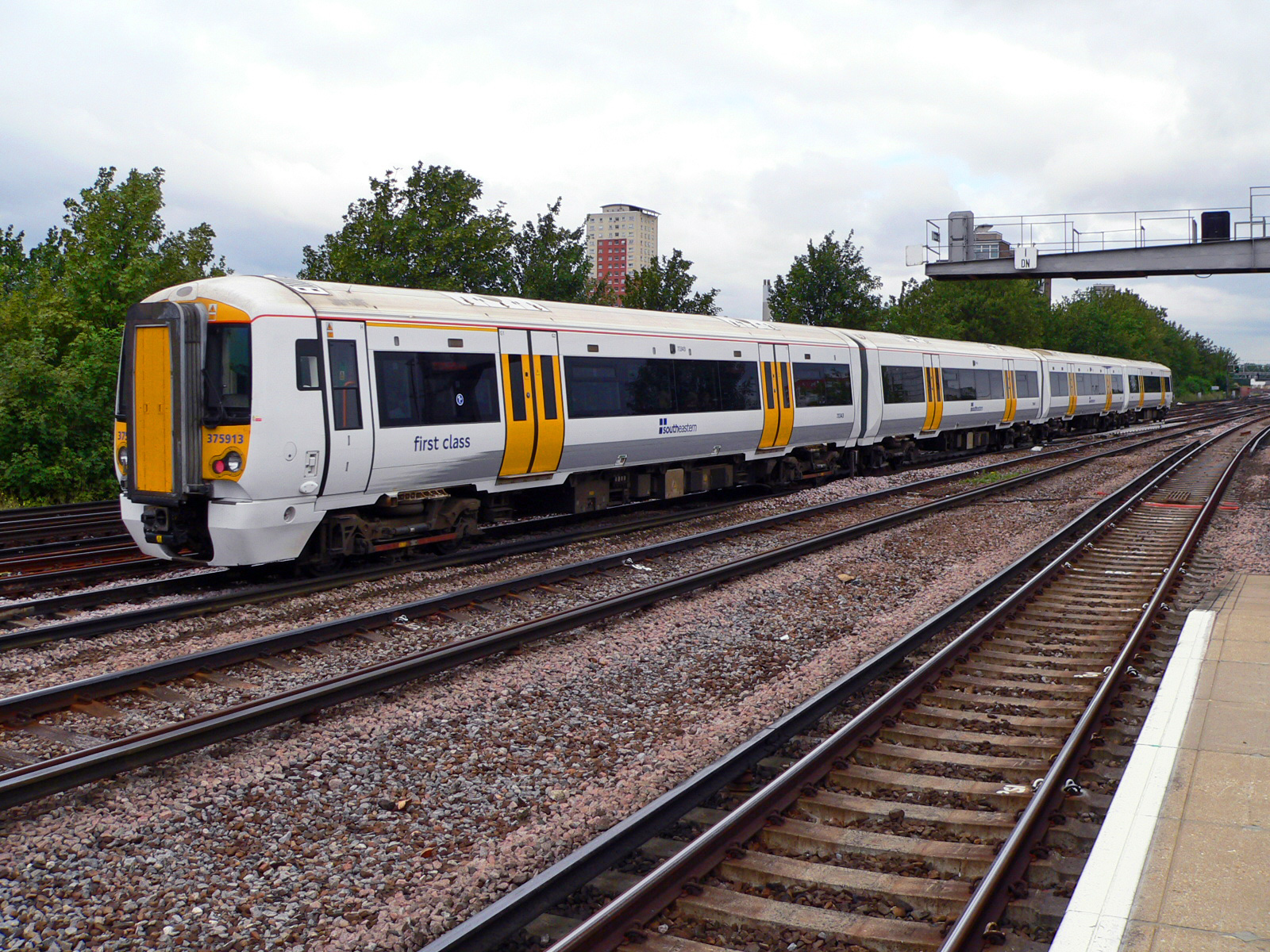
Class 375 Electrostar in the old livery

During December 2003, the Strategic Rail Authority announced that Danish State Railways/Stagecoach, FirstGroup, Govia and MTR/Sea Containers had been shortlisted to bid for the new Integrated Kent franchise, which would replace the South Eastern franchise and include services on High Speed 1 operating from St Pancras. In November 2005, the Department for Transport (DfT) announced Govia had been awarded the franchise; the services operated by South Eastern Trains were transferred to Southeastern on 1 April 2006.

During November 2007, the second phase of High Speed 1 was opened to traffic, resulting in the freeing up of train paths on the traditional network previously used by Eurostar, which permitted Southeastern to increase certain services two months later. During December 2008, as part of the franchise agreement, responsibility for the Redhill to Tonbridge Line was transferred to Southern.

On 14 December 2009, Southeastern launched full operations of its high-speed services using its newly procured fleet of British Rail Class 395 high speed trains. Seven million journeys were recorded on in the first year of this service's operation. The introduction of Southeastern's high-speed services was typically regarded as successful, achieving good reliability and passenger satisfaction figures, as well as being credited for an increase in passenger numbers above that already being experienced on the Kent network.

The initial terms of the franchise had included a period of eight years, along with a two-year option dependent on performance targets being met. During March 2011, having fulfilled these performance criteria, it was announced that the DfT had granted Govia a two-year franchise extension until March 2014.

During March 2009, the bay platforms at London Blackfriars were temporarily closed for reconstruction as part of the Thameslink Programme; accordingly, Southeastern services that previously terminated at Blackfriars, mostly from Sevenoaks via the Catford loop, were extended to Kentish Town, St Albans, Luton or Bedford. When the station fully reopened with new bay platforms in May 2012, these services continued to run, but in the evening and on weekends (when the station had been closed), instead of terminating at Victoria, services terminated at Blackfriars.

Following the DfT review after the cancellation of the InterCity West Coast franchise process in 2012, extensions were granted to the franchises due for renewal in the near future. In 2013, the coalition government opted to extend Southeastern's franchise without competitive tender from March 2014 to June 2018, and in 2016 further extended it until December 2018. The Invitation to Tender was to be released in September 2017 for contract award in August 2018.

Amidst the 2016–18 United Kingdom rail strikes that impacted numerous train operators across the nation, Southeastern cleaning staff, outsourced to employment agency Wettons, voted to stage industrial action in a dispute over pay and working conditions in September 2017. A strike, which involved Wettons cleaning staff affiliated with the National Union of Rail, Maritime and Transport Workers (RMT), took place on 19 October 2017 and lasted for 24 hours. There was no further industrial action, although negotiations between the RMT, Southeastern and Wettons continued for some time.

As part of the 2018 Thameslink Programme, several of the routes formerly operated by Southeastern changed into Thameslink routes, including services to Sevenoaks and Gillingham. These services using the Class 700 now run from Bedford through the London Core via London Bridge and on to the Kent Main Line or the North Kent Line.

=== Development of future franchise ===
During January 2016, Transport for London (TfL) announced its intention to take over the London suburban parts of the franchise from 2018, integrating the routes into a proposed metro network. However, in December 2016, Transport Secretary Chris Grayling rejected this proposed reorganisation; the decision was quickly condemned by Mayor of London Sadiq Khan.

In June 2017, the DfT announced that four parties, comprising an Abellio/East Japan Railway Company/Mitsui consortium, incumbent Govia, Stagecoach and Trenitalia, had been shortlisted to bid for the next South Eastern franchise. On 10 August 2017, Trenitalia withdrew its interest in the franchise. During November 2017, the Invitation to Tender for the next franchise was issued. During February 2018, Alstom joined Stagecoach's bid.

The bid evaluation process was protracted, contributing to short term extensions of the franchise to the incumbent operator. The franchise competition was cancelled on 7 August 2019 and the DfT instead took up a further extension and the operator was to run services until 31 March 2020. However, a new contract was then agreed on 30 March 2020, running up to 16 October 2021, with a possible extension to 31 March 2022.

=== Termination of franchise ===
During September 2021, the DfT announced it would be terminating Govia's South Eastern franchise after revenue declaration discrepancies involving £25 million of public money were discovered. Secretary of State for Transport Grant Shapps stated that this was a serious breach of the "good faith" obligation in the franchise agreement. Following the announcement, shares in Go-Ahead Group (joint owner of Govia) fell 22% and their Chief Financial Officer resigned. During December 2021, Go-Ahead issued an admission of "serious errors and failures", while the trading of its shares on the London Stock Exchange was suspended as the company was unable to publish financial results.

In February 2022, Go-Ahead announced the outcome of investigations into the termination of the franchise; it found that "serious errors had been made” since 2006, with the expected cost to the company to be over £80 million. The amount owed to the DfT was increased to £51.3 million, with errors dating back to the start of the franchise in 2006. Go-Ahead also stated that they expect to have to pay a fine to the DfT, setting aside up to £30 million for this. Go-Ahead also stated that they may also owe DfT an additional £21.3 million, related to a dispute over profit sharing. In March 2022, the government imposed a £23.5 million penalty in addition to the £64 million that it is seeking to recover from the former operator.

On 17 October 2021, state-owned Southeastern (SE Trains Limited) took over the franchise as an operator of last resort.

== Southeastern sub-brands ==
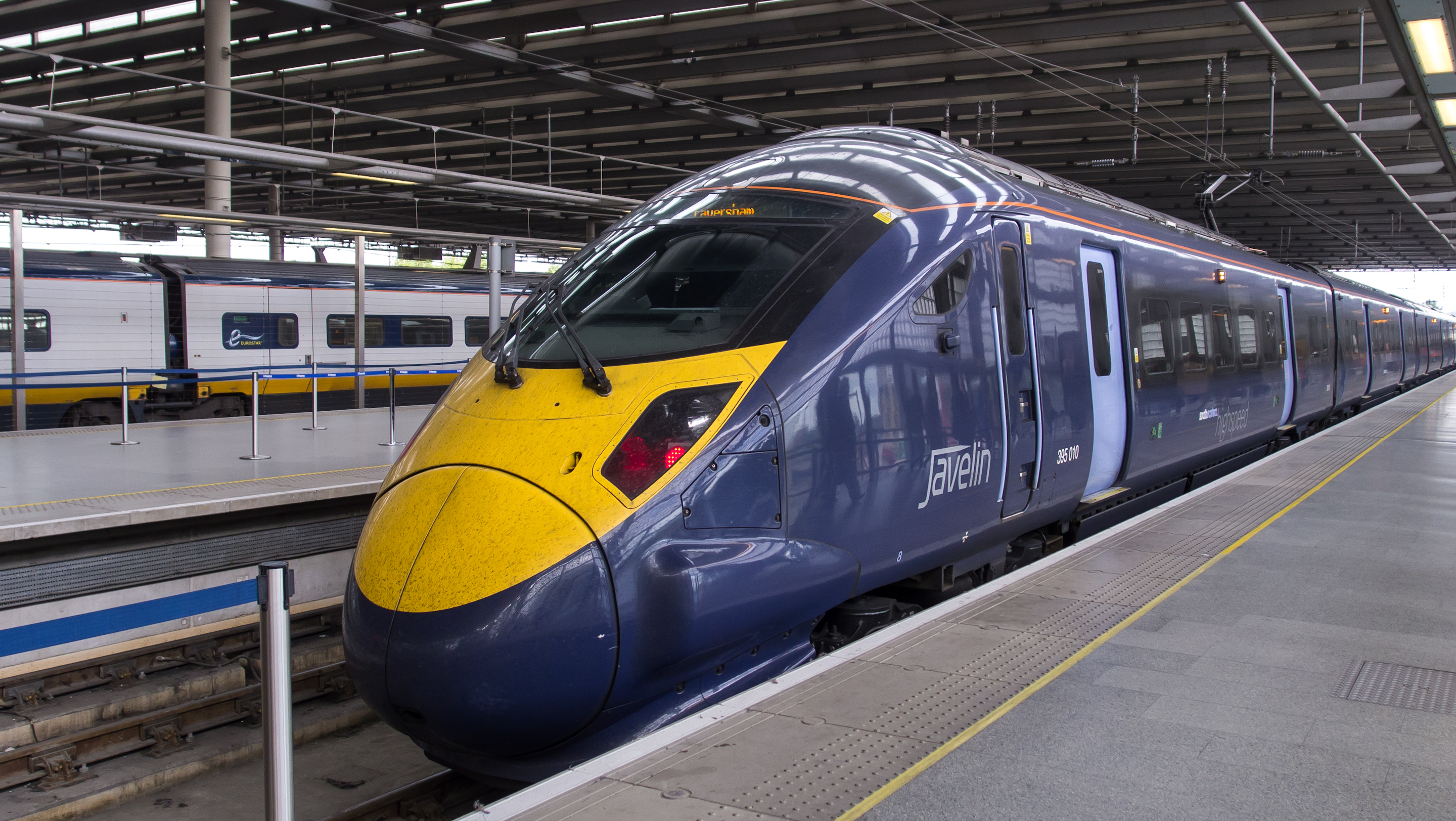
A Class 395 at St Pancras railway station in 2012

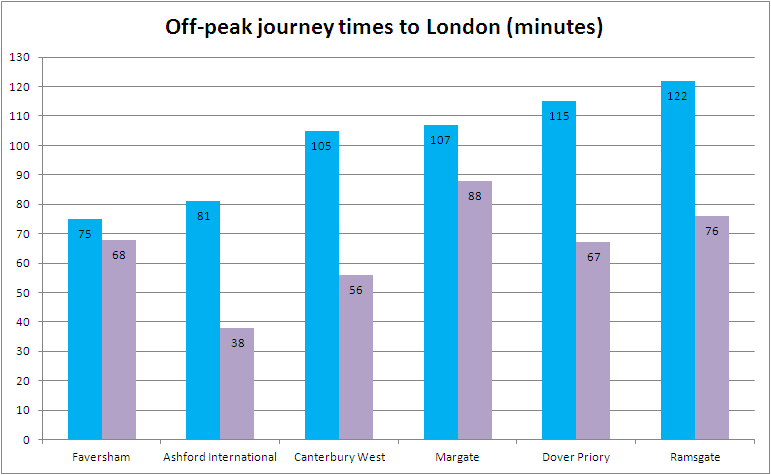
Off-peak journey times from Kent towns to London using classic lines and High Speed 1 in October 2012

=== Highspeed ===
Southeastern introduced a full timetable of domestic high-speed services branded Southeastern Highspeed over High Speed 1 between London St Pancras and Ashford International on 13 December 2009; a limited preview service had been running since 29 June 2009. High-speed trains use High Speed 1 calling at Stratford International and Ebbsfleet International. Trains from London to the Medway towns and Faversham leave the high-speed line at Ebbsfleet and continue via the North Kent line and Chatham Main Line. Trains for Dover Priory and Margate leave the high-speed line at Ashford International. A limited peak-hour service now also operates between St Pancras and Maidstone West via Ebbsfleet and Strood.

When bidding for the franchise, Southeastern made a point of advertising part-owner SNCF's experience operating integrated high-speed train services on the French TGV network. A fleet of 29 six-coach Shinkansen-derived high-speed 'A-trains' were built in Japan by Hitachi for this route. Known as Class 395, this was Hitachi's first train sale in Britain. The colour scheme for the high-speed trains' livery was dark blue. The services were marketed as Southeastern Highspeed, and some of the trains were named after British Olympians such as Steve Redgrave and Ben Ainslie.

At the same time, there was the largest change to the timetable in the area in 40 years. With the fast trains now travelling over High Speed 1, the Charing Cross to Ashford stopping service was extended to Dover, Canterbury and Ramsgate. Fares for journeys that included the High Speed 1 section of line (between St Pancras International and Gravesend) generally included a surcharge.

==== Javelin shuttle ====
Southeastern operated special high speed services using the Class 395 during the 2012 Summer Olympics and Paralympics, branded as the Olympic Javelin or Javelin. As a result, the class is still sometimes referred to as the Javelin.

Announced as part of the successful London 2012 Olympic bid, it was an integral part of a plan to improve public transport in London in readiness for the Olympics, an area of the bid that was initially regarded as being poor by the International Olympic Committee (IOC). The British Olympic Association applied to register Javelin as a UK trademark on 19 July 2005 and this was granted on 2 June 2006.

The service ran for the duration of both games, between St Pancras International station and Ebbsfleet International station, via Stratford International station, which is close to the Olympic Park. Eight trains per hour ran between St Pancras and Ebbsfleet, calling at Stratford, replacing the usual East Kent highspeed service. Two of these were extended to Ashford and one to Faversham. Between 11pm and 1am the service between St Pancras and Ebbsfleet was increased to twelve per hour.

At St Pancras, there is an interchange with the London Underground and with trains to/from the Midlands, Scotland, and the North of England. For track capacity reasons, Eurostar trains, which have never called at Stratford, did not do so during the games. It was expected that over 80% of Olympic spectators would travel to and from the venues by rail. Services to the Olympic Park were planned to offer a total capacity of 240,000 travellers per hour, some 25,000 of whom were expected to use the Javelin service.

=== Mainline ===
Southeastern was the key operator for Kent, and also serves East Sussex. 'Mainline' services connect central London with Dover, Folkestone, Hastings, Royal Tunbridge Wells, Ramsgate, Chatham, Maidstone and Canterbury. The backbone fleet on these services is the Class 375 Electrostar, although Class 377 Electrostars and Class 465/9 Networkers are also used on some routes.

In December 2009, Southeastern saw 'Highspeed' trains stopping at 'Mainline' stations, and some longer timings on 'Mainline' services as trains called at more stations. Services to Tonbridge were maintained at six trains per hour off-peak, two per hour going forward to Ashford and beyond, two per hour to Hastings, and two per hour terminating at Tunbridge Wells. With high-speed services reaching Faversham, the half-hourly Victoria to Faversham stopping service was replaced with an hourly service to Gillingham and additional stops on the "fast" services to London Victoria. On the Maidstone East Line, services from London Cannon Street to Ashford International via Maidstone East and from London Victoria to Maidstone East and to Canterbury West via Ashford were replaced by a half-hourly Victoria to Ashford service. The Strood to Paddock Wood service was extended to Tonbridge. The Sittingbourne to Sheerness on Sea branch line also comes under 'Mainline' services, using Class 375 Electrostars which replaced Class 466 Networkers. Mainline services use a dark blue livery, similar to that of the "Javelin" high-speed trains.

=== Metro ===
Southeastern served South-East London, South London and on into Kent, its central stations being London Blackfriars, London Bridge, Charing Cross, Cannon Street, London Victoria and Waterloo East. 'Metro' trains served Greenwich, New Cross, Lewisham, Dartford, Gravesend, Woolwich Arsenal, Hayes, Peckham Rye, Bromley South, Bickley, Bexleyheath, Petts Wood, Orpington and Sevenoaks. Southeastern ran Class 376 Electrostar, and Class 466 and Class 465 Networkers for 'Metro' services, although a Class 375 Electrostar was used on occasion. The livery for these was white with the Southeastern logo, which was also formerly used for "Mainline" services.

== Routes ==
As of August 2023, the weekday off-peak service pattern, with frequencies in trains per hour (tph), was:

High Speed 1
| Route | tph | Calling at |
|---|---|---|
| London St Pancras International to Ramsgate via Faversham | 1 | Stratford International, Ebbsfleet International, Gravesend, Strood, Rochester, Chatham, Gillingham, Rainham, Sittingbourne, Faversham, Whitstable, Herne Bay, Birchington-on-Sea, Margate, Broadstairs; Supplemented during peak hours with an hourly service to Faversham. |
| London St Pancras International to Ramsgate via Ashford International | 1 | Stratford International, Ebbsfleet International, Ashford International, Folkestone West, Folkestone Central, Dover Priory, Martin Mill, Walmer, Deal, Sandwich |
| London St Pancras International to Margate via Canterbury West | 1 | Stratford International, Ebbsfleet International, Ashford International, Canterbury West, Thanet Parkway, Ramsgate, Broadstairs |
Chatham Main Line
| Route | tph | Calling at |
| London Victoria to Ramsgate via Faversham | 1 | Bromley South, Longfield (London-bound only), Meopham (London-bound only), Rochester, Chatham, Gillingham, Rainham, Sittingbourne, Faversham, Whitstable, Chestfield & Swalecliffe, Herne Bay, Birchington-on-Sea, Westgate-on-Sea, Margate, Broadstairs, Dumpton Park |
| London Victoria to Dover Priory via Faversham | 1 | Bromley South, Longfield (Dover-bound only), Meopham (Dover-bound only), Rochester, Chatham, Gillingham, Rainham, Newington, Sittingbourne, Teynham, Faversham, Selling, Canterbury East, Bekesbourne, Adisham, Aylesham, Snowdown, Shepherds Well, Kearsney |
| London Victoria to Gillingham | 1 | Denmark Hill, Bromley South, St Mary Cray, Swanley, Farningham Road, Longfield, Meopham, Sole Street, Rochester, Chatham |
| Sittingbourne to Sheerness-on-Sea (branch line) | 1 | Kemsley, Swale, Queenborough |
Maidstone Line
| Route | tph | Calling at |
| London Victoria to Ramsgate via Maidstone East | 1 | Bromley South, Swanley, Otford, Borough Green & Wrotham, West Malling, Maidstone East, Bearsted, Hollingbourne, Harrietsham, Lenham, Charing, Ashford International, Wye, Chilham, Chartham, Canterbury West, Sturry, Minster |
| London Victoria to Ashford International via Maidstone East | 1 | Bromley South, St Mary Cray, Swanley, Otford, Kemsing, Borough Green & Wrotham, West Malling, East Malling, Barming, Maidstone East, Bearsted |
South Eastern Main Line
| Route | tph | Calling at |
| London Charing Cross to Ramsgate via Tonbridge | 1 | Waterloo East, London Bridge, Sevenoaks, Tonbridge, Paddock Wood, Marden, Staplehurst, Headcorn, Pluckley, Ashford International, Westenhanger, Sandling, Folkestone West, Folkestone Central, Dover Priory, Martin Mill, Walmer, Deal, Sandwich |
| London Charing Cross to Hastings | 1 | Waterloo East, London Bridge, Orpington, Sevenoaks, Tonbridge, High Brooms, Tunbridge Wells, Wadhurst, Battle, St Leonards Warrior Square |
| London Charing Cross to Hastings | 1 | Waterloo East, London Bridge, Orpington, Sevenoaks, Hildenborough, Tonbridge, High Brooms, Tunbridge Wells, Frant, Wadhurst, Stonegate, Etchingham, Robertsbridge, Battle, Crowhurst, West St Leonards, St Leonards Warrior Square One early morning service (the 0616) starts back from Ore, the only Southeastern service to serve the station |
| London Charing Cross to Tunbridge Wells | 2 | Peak Hours only: Waterloo East, London Bridge, Orpington, Sevenoaks, Hildenborough, Tonbridge, High Brooms |
Medway Valley Line
| Route | tph | Calling at |
| Strood to Tonbridge | 1 | Cuxton, Halling, Snodland, New Hythe, Aylesford, Maidstone Barracks, Maidstone West, East Farleigh, Wateringbury, Yalding, Beltring, Paddock Wood; Supplemented during peak hours with an hourly service to Maidstone West. |
Metro - North Kent Line
| Route | tph | Calling at |
| London Cannon Street to London Cannon Street via Greenwich (clockwise) | 2 | London Bridge, Deptford, Greenwich, Maze Hill, Westcombe Park, Charlton, Woolwich Dockyard, Woolwich Arsenal, Plumstead, Abbey Wood, Belvedere, Erith, Slade Green... Services continue to/from London Cannon Street via Sidcup (see below). |
| London Charing Cross to Dartford via Blackheath and Abbey Wood | 2 | Waterloo East, London Bridge, Lewisham, Blackheath, Charlton, Woolwich Dockyard, Woolwich Arsenal, Plumstead, Abbey Wood, Belvedere, Erith, Slade Green, Dartford |
Metro - Bexleyheath Line
| Route | tph | Calling at |
| London Charing Cross to Dartford via Bexleyheath | 2 | Waterloo East, London Bridge, Lewisham, Blackheath, Kidbrooke, Eltham, Falconwood, Welling, Bexleyheath, Barnehurst |
| London Victoria to Dartford via Bexleyheath | 2 | Denmark Hill, Peckham Rye, Nunhead, Lewisham, Blackheath, Kidbrooke, Eltham, Falconwood, Welling, Bexleyheath, Barnehurst |
Metro - Sidcup Line
| Route | tph | Calling at |
| London Cannon Street to London Cannon Street via Sidcup (anticlockwise) | 2 | London Bridge, New Cross, St Johns, Lewisham, Hither Green, Lee, Mottingham, New Eltham, Sidcup, Albany Park, Bexley, Crayford, Slade Green... Services continue to/from London Cannon Street via Greenwich (see above). |
| London Charing Cross to Gravesend via Sidcup | 2 | Waterloo East, London Bridge, Hither Green, Lee, Mottingham, New Eltham, Sidcup, Albany Park, Bexley, Crayford, Dartford, Stone Crossing, Greenhithe, Swanscombe, Northfleet |
Metro - South Eastern Main Line
| Route | tph | Calling at |
| London Cannon Street to Orpington via Grove Park | 2 | London Bridge, New Cross, St Johns, Lewisham, Hither Green, Grove Park, Elmstead Woods, Chislehurst, Petts Wood |
| London Charing Cross to Sevenoaks via Grove Park | 2 | Waterloo East, London Bridge, Hither Green, Grove Park, Elmstead Woods, Chislehurst, Petts Wood, Orpington, Chelsfield, Knockholt, Dunton Green |
| Grove Park to Bromley North (branch line) | 3 | Sundridge Park |
Metro - Hayes Line
| Route | tph | Calling at |
| London Cannon Street to Hayes | 2 | London Bridge, New Cross, St Johns, Lewisham, Ladywell, Catford Bridge, Lower Sydenham, New Beckenham, Clock House, Elmers End, Eden Park, West Wickham; Supplemented during peak hours with a half-hourly service from London Charing Cross, additionally calling at Waterloo East and skipping New Cross, St Johns and Lewisham. |
Metro - Chatham Main Line
| Route | tph | Calling at |
| London Victoria to Orpington via Beckenham Junction | 2 | Brixton, Herne Hill, West Dulwich, Sydenham Hill, Penge East, Kent House, Beckenham Junction, Shortlands, Bromley South, Bickley, Petts Wood; Supplemented during peak hours with a half-hourly service to Bromley South. |

== Ticketing ==
At the time of its franchise ending in 2021, Oyster cards were valid from all Zone 1–9 stations served by the company, the London fare zones having been extended to include stations such as Dartford after an initial outcry by passengers being required to travel to Zone 6 stations such as Slade Green, Barnehurst or Crayford to "tap in" before continuing on their journey. Travelcards (including on Oyster) are however were not valid on High-Speed services, except between St Pancras International and Stratford International at a special pay-as-you-go fare.

== Performance ==
During late 2010, the company faced a barrage of criticism for its performance during extreme weather conditions in the south-east of England and there are also allegations from passenger advocacy groups and MPs of both parties that Southeastern deliberately runs reduced services to skew its official performance figures.

In 2014, a survey of UK rail passenger satisfaction showed Southeastern to be the lowest-rated train operating company, with just forty per cent of passengers believing that good service is provided and a rating of only one out of five for value for money. Southeastern claimed that the reason for this is that people dislike going to work and that if the survey were to be retaken on a "sunny summer's day" the outcome would be better for the company.

In a survey (Best and worst UK train companies) carried out in February 2015 by Which? magazine, Southeastern continued to rank poorly, rated as the second-worst UK train operating train companies customer score of just 44%. This was narrowly ahead of Govia Thameslink Railway, with 43%. Southeastern also achieved only 2/5 or 3/5 star ratings across the six specific categories assessed in the survey (such categories included Punctuality, Reliability and Cleanliness of toilets).

Southeastern performed poorly in performance and passenger satisfaction in 2016, with the 2016 survey by Which? magazine finding Southeastern to be the joint-worst performing train operating company in Britain, with a customer score of just 46%. The Spring 2016 National Rail Passenger Survey further underlined Southeastern's continuing poor performance and passenger satisfaction. The company issued a joint response with Network Rail on the day of publication, primarily blaming outside factors and survey methodology. The 2016 Which? figures were backed up by the 2016 Transport Focus survey, which placed Southeastern joint bottom in satisfaction on service delivery. Satisfaction with the frequency of services declined year on year from 73% to 56%, and satisfaction with ticket value scored 30%, the lowest of any operator in the country.

In the Autumn 2019 National Rail Passenger Survey, 81% of passengers using Southeastern services were satisfied with their journeys. This was the company's highest score for six years and an increase of 3% on the previous year.

== Rolling stock ==
Southeastern operated a fleet of approximately 400 trains, all of which are electric multiple units and have been taken over by its successor Southeastern.

=== Fleet at end of franchise ===
| Family | Class | Image | Type | Top speed | | Number | Carriages | Routes operated | Built | Operated from |
| Family | Class | Image | Type | mph | km/h | Number | Carriages | Routes operated | Built | Operated from |
|---|---|---|---|---|---|---|---|---|---|---|
| Bombardier Electrostar | 375 | | EMU | 100 | 160 | 10 | 3 | Main line routes | 1999–2005 | 2006 |
| Bombardier Electrostar | 375 | | EMU | 100 | 160 | 102 | 4 | Main line routes | 1999–2005 | 2006 |
| Bombardier Electrostar | 376 | | EMU | 75 | 120 | 36 | 5 | Metro routes | 2004–2005 | 2006 |
| Bombardier Electrostar | 377/1 | | EMU | 100 | 160 | 2 | 4 | Main line routes | 2003 | 2017 |
| Bombardier Electrostar | 377/5 | | EMU | 100 | 160 | 23 | 4 | Main line routes | 2008-2009 | 2016-2017 |
| Hitachi AT300 | 395 Javelin | | EMU | 140 | 225 | 29 | 6 | High Speed 1 services | 2007–2009 | 2009 |
| Networker | 465 | | EMU | 75 | 120 | 147 | 4 | Main line and metro routes | 1991–1994 | 2006 |
| Networker | 466 | | EMU | 75 | 120 | 43 | 2 | Metro and limited main line routes. | 1993–1994 | 2006 |
| Desiro City | 707 City Beam | | EMU | 100 | 161 | 14 | 5 | Metro routes | 2015–2018 | 2021 |

=== Past fleet ===
The transfer of some routes to Southern and Thameslink allowed Southeastern to withdraw its small fleet of Class 508 EMUs and replace them with Networker stock cascaded from other services.

| Family | Class | Image | Type | Top speed | | Number | Cars | Routes operated | Built | Withdrawn |
| Family | Class | Image | Type | mph | km/h | Number | Cars | Routes operated | Built | Withdrawn |
|---|---|---|---|---|---|---|---|---|---|---|
| BREL 1972 | 508/2 | | EMU | 75 | 120 | 12 | 3 | Rural routes (mainly branches) | 1979–1980 | 2008 |

== Driver depots ==
Southeastern's drivers were based at the following locations;

- Ashford
- Dartford
- Dover
- Faversham
- Gillingham
- Grove Park
- Hastings
- Charing Cross
- London Victoria (Eastern)
- Orpington
- Ramsgate
- Slade Green
- Tonbridge

| Preceded by South Eastern Trains; South Eastern franchise | Operator of Integrated Kent franchise 2006 – 2021 | Succeeded by Southeastern (SE Trains) |
| Incumbent | Operator of Integrated Kent franchise 2006 – 2021 | Succeeded by Southeastern (SE Trains) |
| Incumbent | New creation HS1 Domestic Services | Succeeded by Southeastern (SE Trains) |
