= South Eastern Trains =

Former British train operator

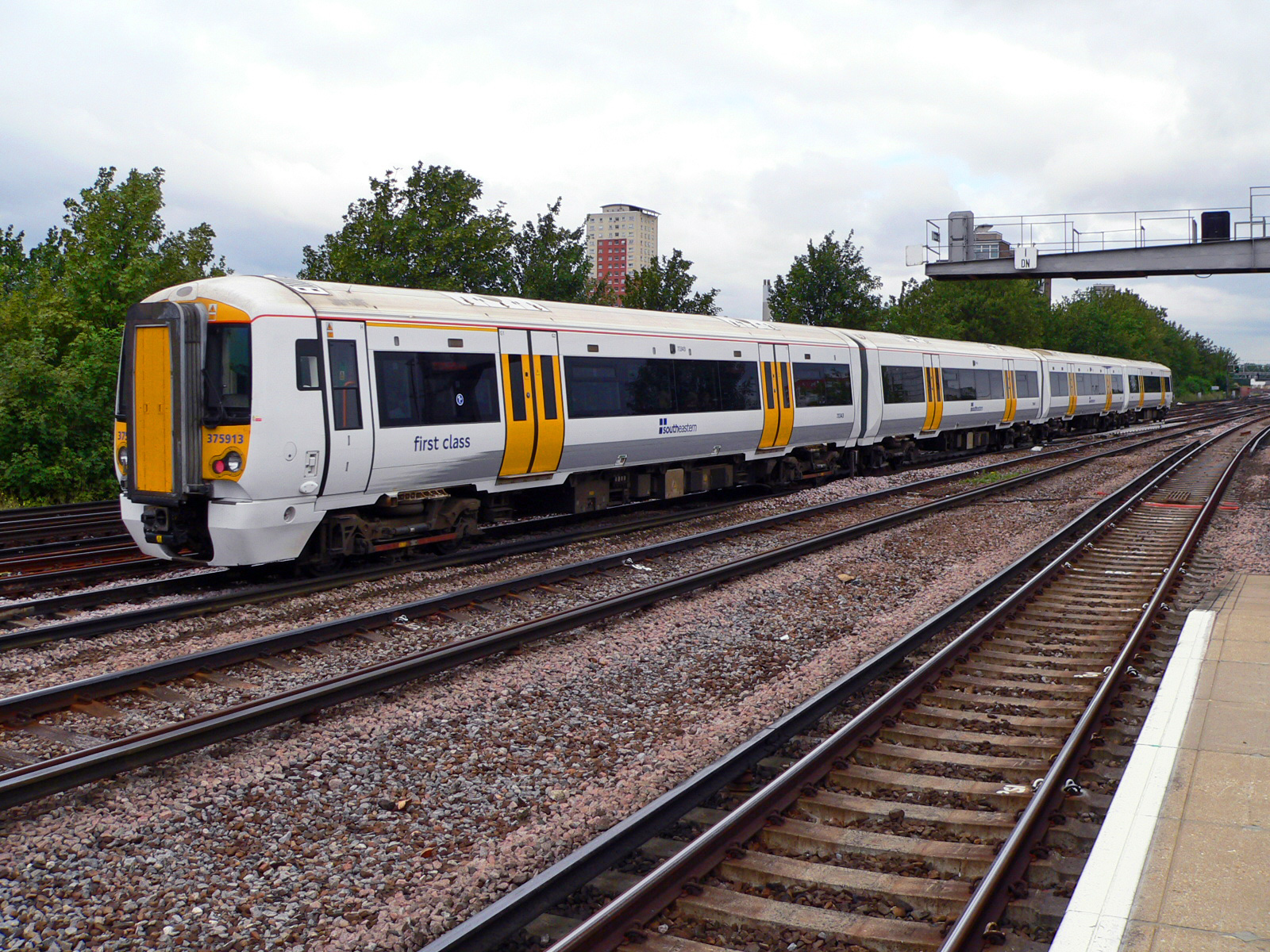
- Class 375 Electrostar at New Cross in 2006

Overview
- Franchises: South Eastern; 9 November 2003 – 31 March 2006
- Main regions: Greater London, Kent
- Other regions: East Sussex, West Sussex, Surrey
- Fleet: approximately 350
- Stations called at: 178
- Parent company: Strategic Rail Authority (state-owned)
- Reporting mark: SE
- Predecessor: Connex South Eastern
- Successor: London & South Eastern Railway

Other
- Website: http://www.southeasternrailway.co.uk

South Eastern Trains (stylised as Southeastern) was a state-owned British train operating company that operated the South Eastern Passenger Rail Franchise between November 2003, when it took over from Connex South Eastern, and 1 April 2006, when London & South Eastern Railway began operating the new Integrated Kent franchise.

== History ==
South Eastern Trains began operating the South Eastern franchise from November 2003, taking over after the franchise was removed from Connex South Eastern. On 18 January 2005 the Strategic Rail Authority issued the Integrated Kent franchise Invitation to Tender to the shortlisted bidders.

On 30 November 2005 the Department for Transport awarded Govia the Integrated Kent franchise. The services operated by South Eastern Trains transferred to London & South Eastern Railway on 1 April 2006.

== Services ==
=== Main lines ===
The railway lines of Kent, many of which South Eastern Trains ran services on

From London termini (London Victoria, London Bridge, London Charing Cross, London Blackfriars and London Cannon Street) unless otherwise stated;

- North Kent Line – services via Dartford to Gillingham
- Chatham Main Line – services to the Kent Coast via Bromley South and Chatham, dividing at Faversham to Ramsgate and Dover
- Swanley to Ashford (via Maidstone East) Line
- South Eastern Main Line – services to the Kent Coast via Ashford and Sevenoaks
  - Ashford to Ramsgate (via Canterbury West) line
  - Ashford to Ramsgate (via Folkestone and Dover) line (Kent Coast Line)
- Hastings Line (Hastings via Tunbridge Wells)
- London Bridge to Tunbridge Wells (via East Croydon and Redhill) – uses part of the Brighton Main Line
- Horsham to Tunbridge Wells (via Gatwick and Redhill) – uses part of the Brighton Main Line

=== Suburban lines ===
The suburban services (called ‘Metro’ in the SET timetables) ran to:

- Sevenoaks: two services – one via Grove Park, and one via Bromley South
- Hayes line
- Mid-Kent Line
- Orpington via Lewisham and via Bromley South
- Swanley
- Dartford via: North Kent Line; the Bexleyheath Line and the Dartford Loop Line.
- Bromley North Line

=== Rural lines ===
- Medway Valley Line, some services extended to Tonbridge.
- Sheerness Line

== Rolling stock ==
South Eastern Trains inherited a fleet of Class 365, Class 375, Class 411, Class 421, Class 423, Class 508, Class 465 and Class 466s from Connex South Eastern. During its tenure South Eastern Trains introduced the remaining Class 375s into service as well as the full Class 376 fleet. All remaining Class 411, Class 421 and Class 423s were withdrawn and scrapped by October 2005, while the Class 365s were transferred to West Anglia Great Northern in 2004. Rolling stock was maintained at Ashford and Ramsgate depots.

Preceded by Connex South Eastern	Operator of South Eastern franchise 2003–2006	Succeeded by London & South Eastern Railway; Integrated Kent franchise
