= South Eastern franchise =

Railway Franchise In the UK

South Eastern
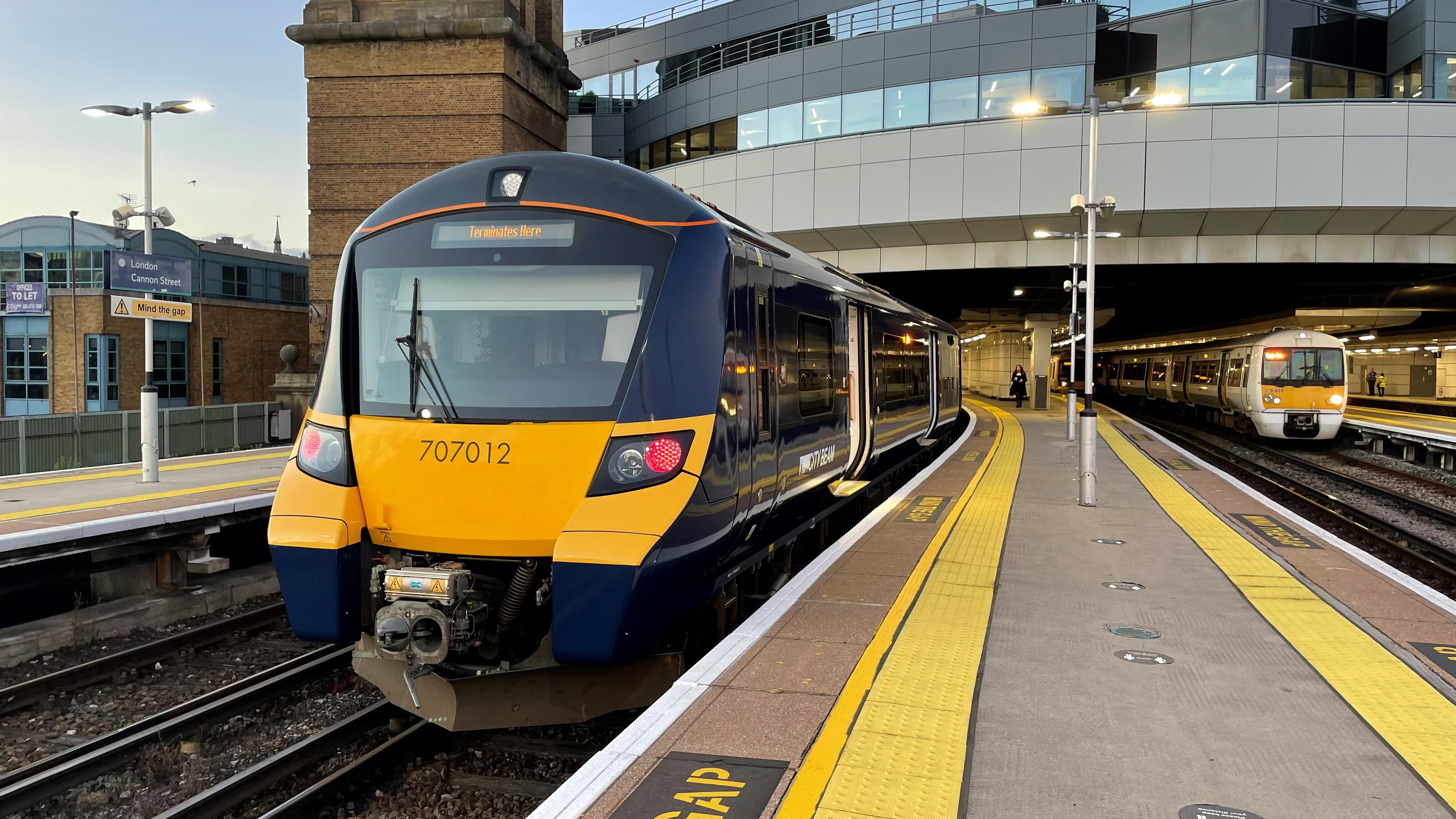
- Southeastern Class 707 City Beam and Class 376 trains at Cannon Street in September 2021
- Operator: Southeastern
- Main Regions: London; Kent
- Stations called at: 179
- Stations operated: 174
- Dates of operation: Connex South Eastern: 13 Oct 1996 – 8 Nov 2003; South Eastern Trains: 9 Nov 2003 – 31 Mar 2006; Southeastern (Govia-owned): 1 Apr 2006 – 16 Oct 2021; Southeastern (DfT-owned): 17 Oct 2021 – 17 October 2027
Route map

The South Eastern franchise, also known as the Integrated Kent franchise, is a railway franchise for the provision of passenger services between London and Kent in South East England.

== History ==
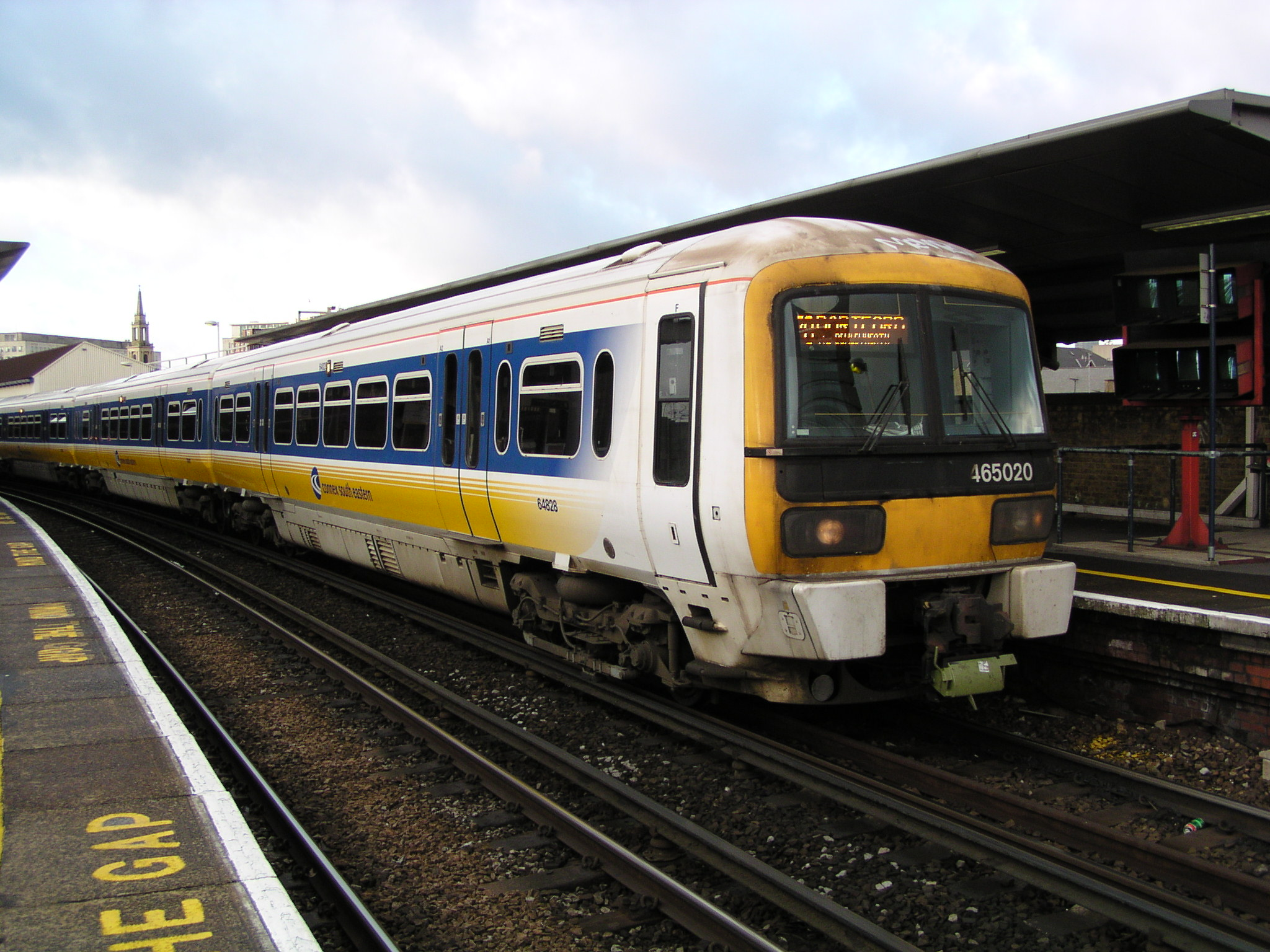
Connex South Eastern 465020 at Waterloo East in January 2003

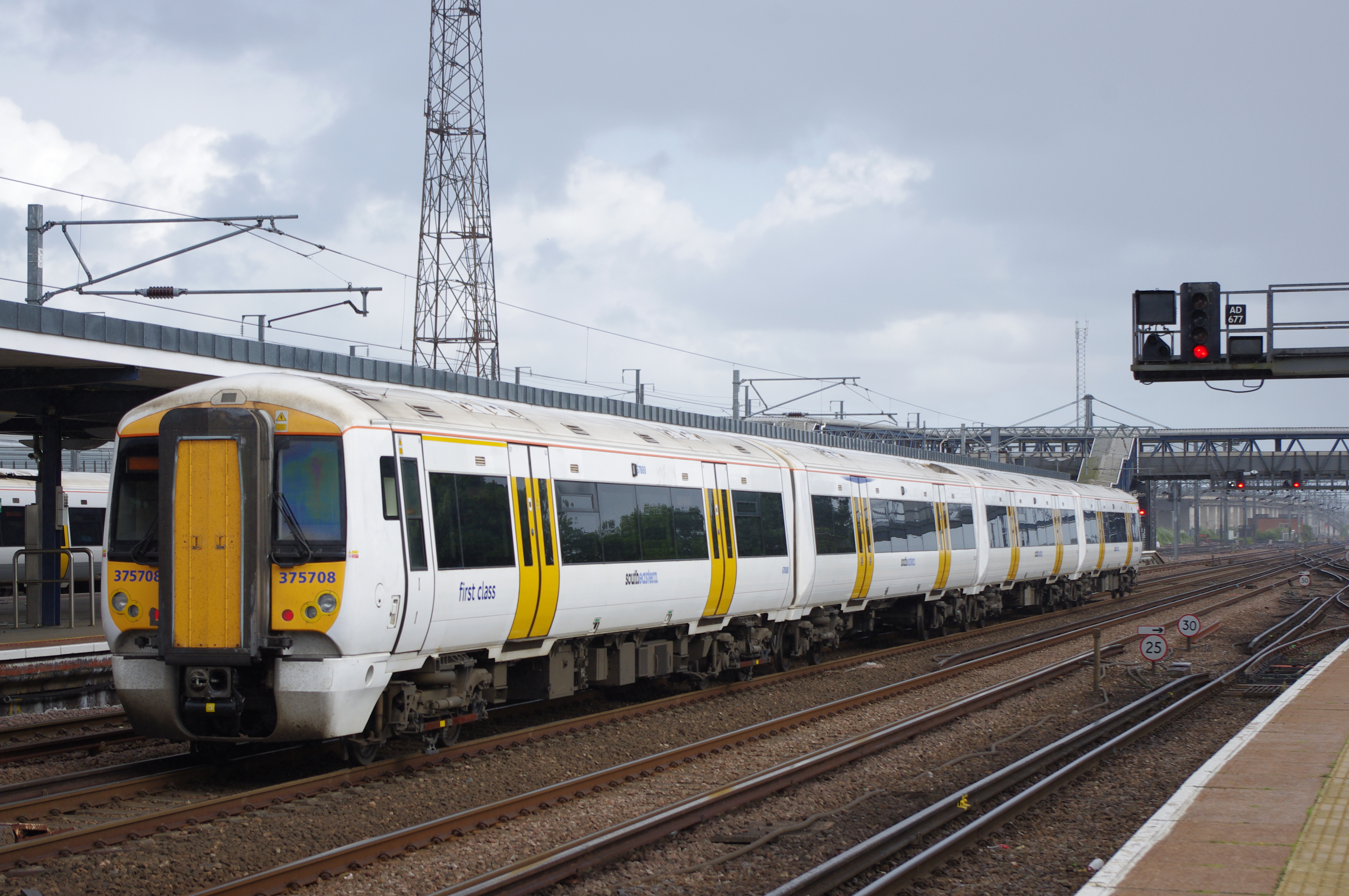
Southeastern (Govia) 375708 at Ashford International in June 2011

The South Eastern franchise was formed as a shadow franchise in 1994 in the leadup to the privatisation of British Rail, taking over the Network SouthEast services out of Blackfriars, Cannon Street, Charing Cross, London Bridge and London Victoria to Kent.

=== 1996: Connex South Eastern ===
Initially operating as South Eastern, on 13 October 1996 Connex South Eastern commenced operating the franchise having beaten bids from a management/FirstBus consortium, GB Railways and Stagecoach.

In December 2002, after the franchise ran into financial trouble, the Strategic Rail Authority (SRA) agreed to bail it out with a £58 million injection, with the end date brought forward from 2011 until 2006. However, continuing poor financial management resulted in the SRA deciding to strip Connex of the franchise in June 2003. Connex South Eastern continued to operate the franchise until 8 November 2003.

=== 2003: South Eastern Trains ===
On 9 November 2003 South Eastern Trains, a subsidiary company of the SRA, took over the franchise for a planned 18 months. It took on all the leased rolling stock and most of the Connex staff including senior management. In the event, it took over two years to re-let the franchise to a private company.

=== 2006: Southeastern (Govia) ===
In December 2003 the SRA announced that Danish State Railways/Stagecoach, FirstGroup, Govia and MTR/Sea Containers had been shortlisted to bid for the replacement Integrated Kent franchise that would also incorporate services on High Speed 1 out of St Pancras. In November 2005 the Department for Transport (DfT) announced that Govia had been awarded the franchise, with the services operated by South Eastern Trains transferred to London & South Eastern Railway Limited, branded as Southeastern, on 1 April 2006.

The franchise was let for an initial eight years, with a two-year option dependent on performance targets being met. In December 2008, as part of the franchise agreement, operation of services on the Redhill to Tonbridge Line passed to Southern. High Speed 1 services began on 14 December 2009. Having met the performance criteria, in March 2011 the DfT granted Govia a two-year franchise extension until March 2014.

Following the DfT's review after the cancellation of the InterCity West Coast franchise process, extensions were granted to the franchises coming due for renewal, with Southeastern's franchise extended until June 2018. It was further extended a number of times.

In June 2017 the DfT announced that an Abellio/East Japan Railway Company/Mitsui & Co consortium, incumbent Govia, Stagecoach and Trenitalia had been shortlisted for the next franchise, which was once again named the South Eastern franchise. In August 2017, Trenitalia withdrew citing a desire to concentrate its resources on its bid for the West Coast Partnership. In February 2018, it was announced that Alstom would take a 20% shareholding in the Stagecoach company. In April 2019, Stagecoach was disqualified from the bidding because they did not meet pensions rules.

On 7 August 2019, the franchise competition was cancelled and the DfT instead took up a further extension. The franchise was due to cease on 31 March 2020 until a new contract was agreed on 30 March 2020, running for up to two years.

=== 2021: Southeastern (DfT) ===
In September 2021, Transport Secretary Grant Shapps announced that Southeastern's contract would end on 16 October 2021, with operations transferred to the DfT OLR Holdings-owned operator of last resort, Southeastern, which is continuing to operate under the Southeastern name. This followed an investigation conducted by the Department for Transport which found that, since October 2014, Southeastern had failed to return over £25 million of taxpayer funding. Southeastern's contract runs until 17 October 2027.
