= British Rail Class 376 =

British electric multiple-unit passenger train manufactured by Bombardier Transportation

British Rail Class 376 Electrostar
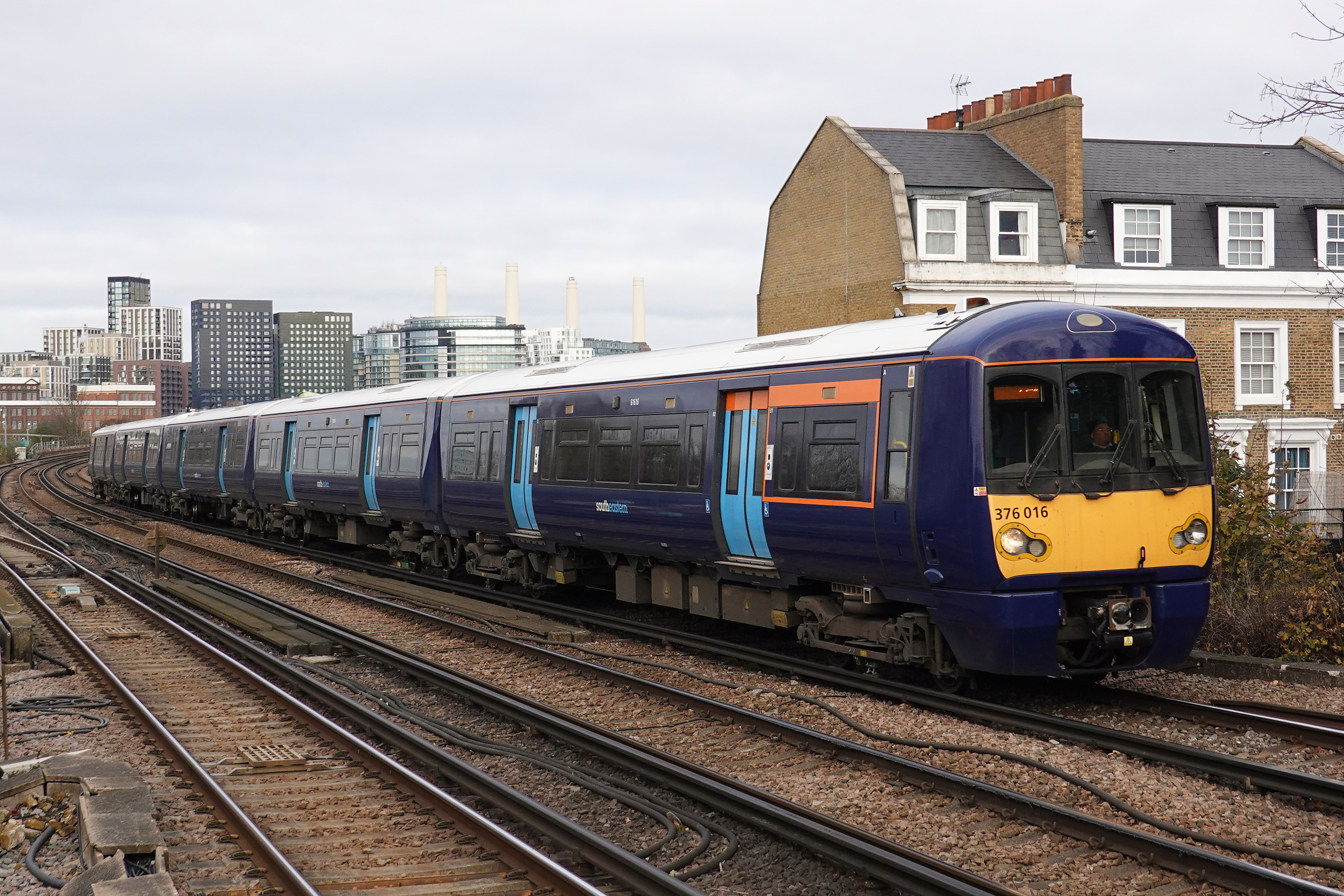
- Class 376 passing Wandsworth Road in 2025

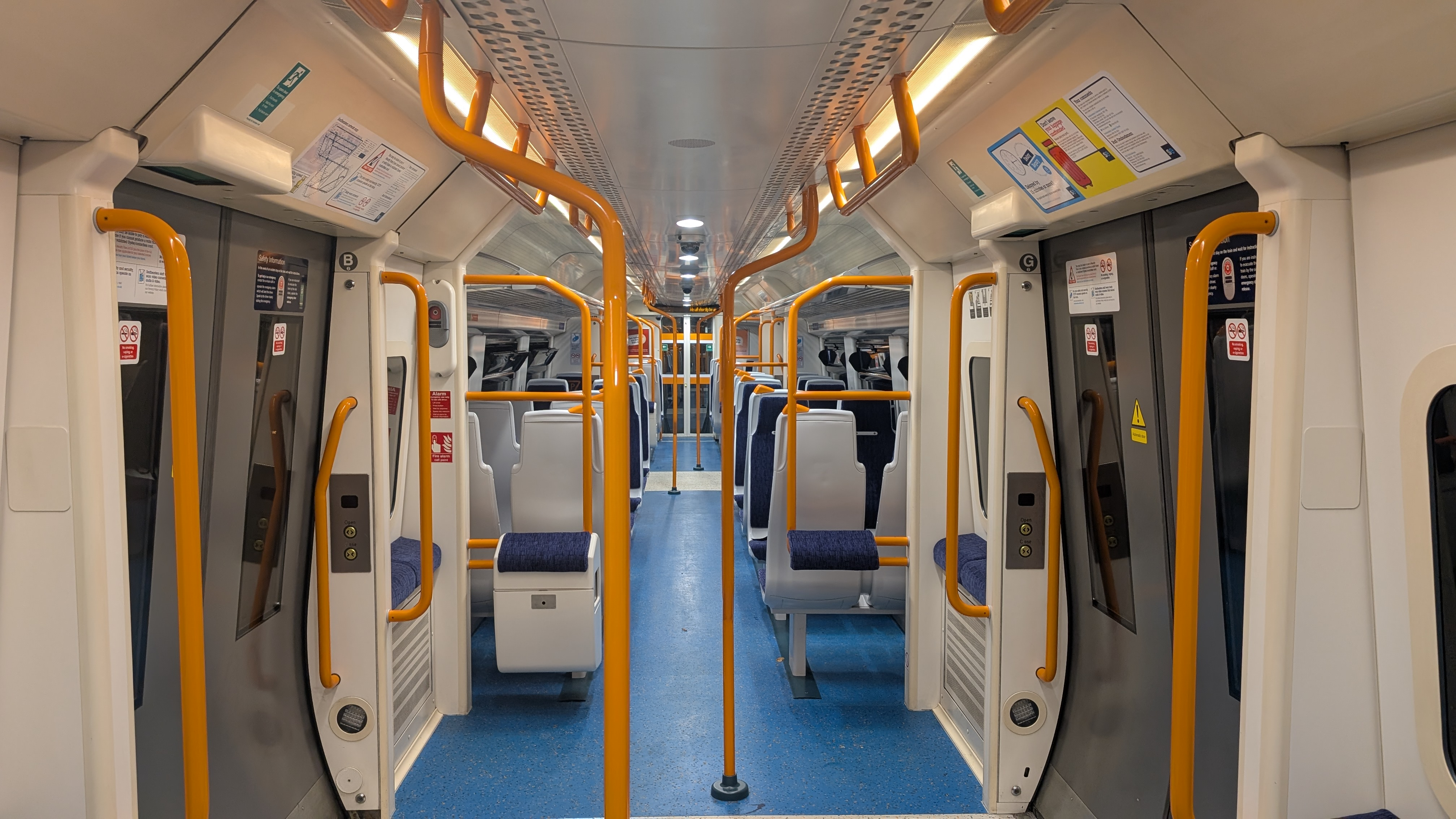
- The refreshed interior of a Class 376 unit
- In service: 16 August 2004 – present
- Manufacturer: Bombardier Transportation
- Built at: Derby Litchurch Lane Works
- Family name: Electrostar
- Replaced: Class 421; Class 423; Class 465; Class 466
- Constructed: 2004–2005
- Number built: 36
- Formation: 5 cars per unit: DMS-MS-TS-MS-DMS
- Capacity: 222 seats; plus 12 tip-up
- Owner: Eversholt Rail Group
- Operator: Southeastern
- Depots: Slade Green; Ramsgate

Specifications
- Car length: DM cars: 19.95 m (65 ft 5 in); MS & TS: 19.69 m (64 ft 7 in)
- Maximum speed: 75 mph (121 km/h)
- Acceleration: 0.66 m/s^{2} (1.5 mph/s)
- Electric system: 750 V DC third rail
- Current collection: Contact shoe
- Safety systems: AWS; TPWS
- Coupling system: Dellner 12
- Multiple working: Within class
- Track gauge: 1,435 mm (4 ft 8 1/2 in) standard gauge

The British Rail Class 376 Electrostar is a class of electric multiple unit passenger train that was manufactured by Bombardier Transportation at its Derby Litchurch Lane Works. It is part of the Electrostar family, which are the most common EMUs introduced since the privatisation of British Rail. The units were ordered by Connex South Eastern and introduced in 2004/2005 by South Eastern Trains to replace Class 465 and Class 466, which were transferred to Outer Suburban services to Kent to replace the Class 423 slam-door trains.

== Refurbishment ==
In early 2025 it was announced that all 36 Class 376 units would undergo a mid-life refresh. Changes include a new exterior wrap in the current blue Southeastern livery on the exterior, new LED lighting, refurbished seating, at-seat power, USB sockets and newer, blue paintwork and design in the interior. The work is being conducted at Southeastern's Gillingham and Grove Park depots.

The first partially refurbished unit, 376 027, re-entered service on 16 April 2025 with the unit having been fully refurbished by 27 November 2025.

== Maintenance ==
All Class 376 trains are allocated to Slade Green Depot, but due to the high volume of work there, these trains are sent to Ramsgate EMUD for routine maintenance.

== Fleet details ==
| Class | Operator | No. built | Year built | Cars per unit | Unit nos. |
|---|---|---|---|---|---|
| 376 | Southeastern | 36 | 2004–2005 | 5 | 376001–376036 |

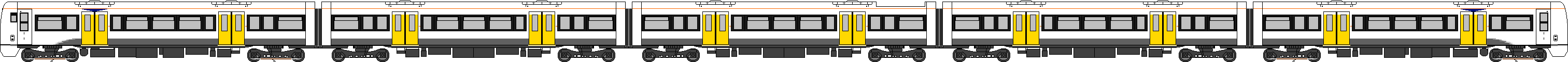
Side-profile illustration of a Class 376 unit

=== Named units ===
- 376001 Alan Doggett
- 376029 Tom Wild

== Accidents and incidents ==
A train formed by units 376 002 and 376 035 was one of eleven trains that stalled and became stranded in the Lewisham area on 2 March 2018. Passengers self-evacuated the train after conditions on board became intolerable due to lack of heating, toilets and communication.

On 10 July 2018, 376 030 partially derailed at Grove Park depot.

== See also ==
- British Rail Class 378
