= Orpington engine shed =

Former railway maintenance depot in Orpington, Greater London

Orpington shed
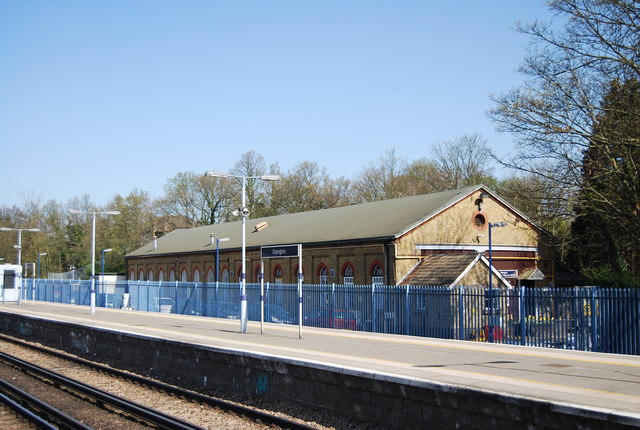
- Orpington shed, seen from the station

Location
- Location: Orpington, Greater London
- Coordinates: 51.3771°N 0.0857°E
- OS grid: TQ452663

Characteristics
- Owner: Network Rail
- Type: Steam locomotive

History
- Opened: 1899 (MPD)
- Closed: 1926 (MPD)

The former Orpington engine shed is located in Orpington, Greater London, England. It is situated on the eastern side of the South East Main Line and to the north of Orpington station.

The shed's code was ON.

== History ==
Located at the end of the suburban belt where the 4 tracks of the South Eastern Main Line reduce to two, Orpington steam locomotive depot had a 55-foot turntable and a two-road steam locomotive shed, adjacent to the station. Following electrification, the shed was closed and was converted into offices for train drivers and support staff. In 2007 a driver training centre with a driving simulator was established at the northern end of the building.

The large carriage cleaning shed north of the station was demolished, and replaced by a 4-road Electric multiple unit stabling sidings.

In 1989, Class 415 and Class 416 were the principal EMUs working from Orpington. These were replaced from 1992 onwards by Class 465 and Class 466 Networkers. From 2004 onwards Class 376 EMUs were added to the fleet. Southeastern currently operates suburban services from here.
