= British Rail Class 466 =

British class of electric multiple unit trains

British Rail Class 466 Networker
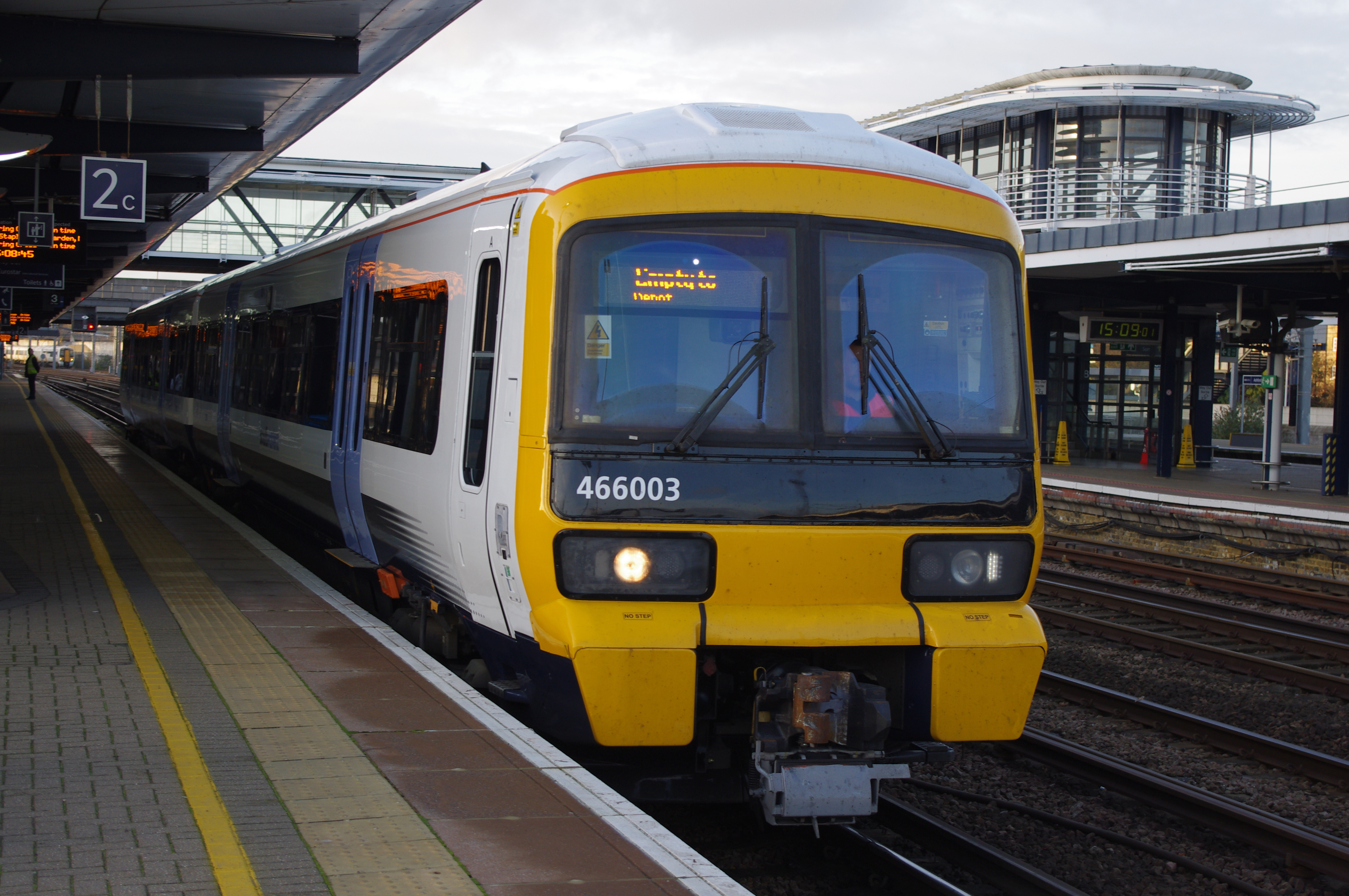
- Class 466 at Ashford International

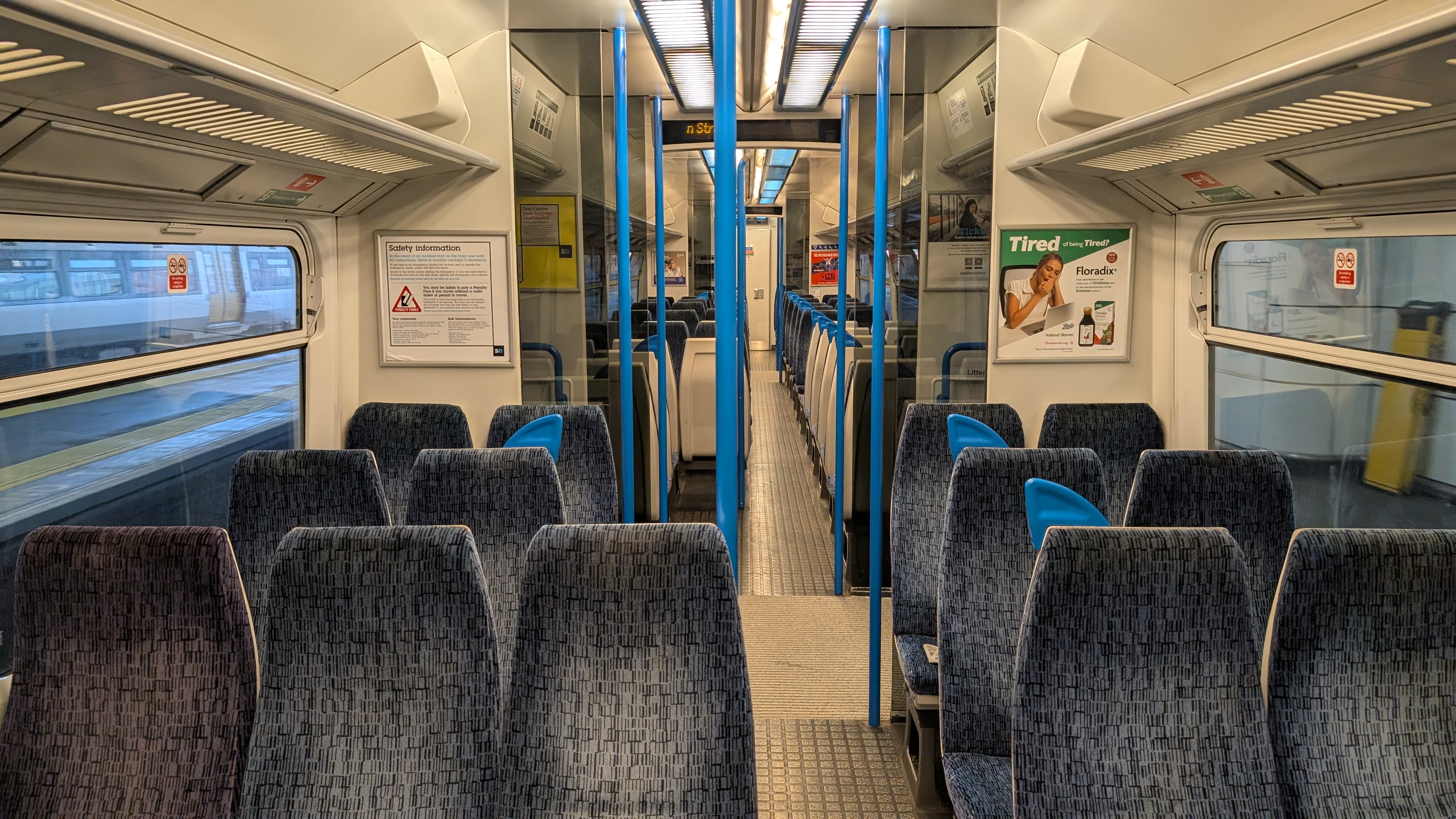
- Refreshed saloon of a class 466
- In service: 1993–present
- Manufacturer: Metro-Cammell
- Built at: Washwood Heath, Birmingham
- Family name: Networker
- Replaced: Class 415; Class 416; Class 423; Class 508
- Constructed: 1993–1994
- Refurbished: 2011–2013 at Wabtec Doncaster
- Number built: 43
- Number in service: 16
- Number preserved: 1
- Number scrapped: 26
- Successor: Class 707
- Formation: 2 cars per unit: DMOS-DTSOL
- Fleet numbers: 466001–466043
- Capacity: 168 seats
- Owner: Angel Trains
- Operators: Current: Southeastern; Former: Network SouthEast, Connex South Eastern, South Eastern Trains, Southeastern (Govia)
- Depot: Slade Green

Specifications
- Car body construction: Aluminium
- Car length: 20.80 m (68 ft 3 in)
- Width: 2.80 m (9 ft 2 in)
- Height: 3.77 m (12 ft 4 in)
- Doors: Double-leaf sliding plug (2 per side per car)
- Maximum speed: 75 mph (121 km/h)
- Weight: DM vehs.: 40.6 t (40.0 long tons; 44.8 short tons); DT vehs.: 31.4 t (30.9 long tons; 34.6 short tons)
- Traction system: GEC Alsthom GTO-VVVF
- Traction motors: GEC G34AZ Gearboxes with GEC Alsthom G352BY 280 KW
- Power output: 1,120 kW (1,500 hp)
- Electric systems: 750 V DC third rail
- Current collection: Contact shoe
- UIC classification: Bo′Bo′+2′2′
- Bogies: Powered: SRP BP58; Unpowered: SRP BT49
- Braking systems: Electro-pneumatic (disc) Friction and rheostatic/regenerative
- Safety systems: AWS; TPWS
- Coupling system: Tightlock
- Multiple working: Within class and with Class 465
- Track gauge: 1,435 mm (4 ft 8 1/2 in) standard gauge

The British Rail Class 466 Networker is a type of electric multiple unit (EMU) passenger train built by Metro-Cammell between 1993 and 1994. The units are currently operated by Southeastern.

== Description ==
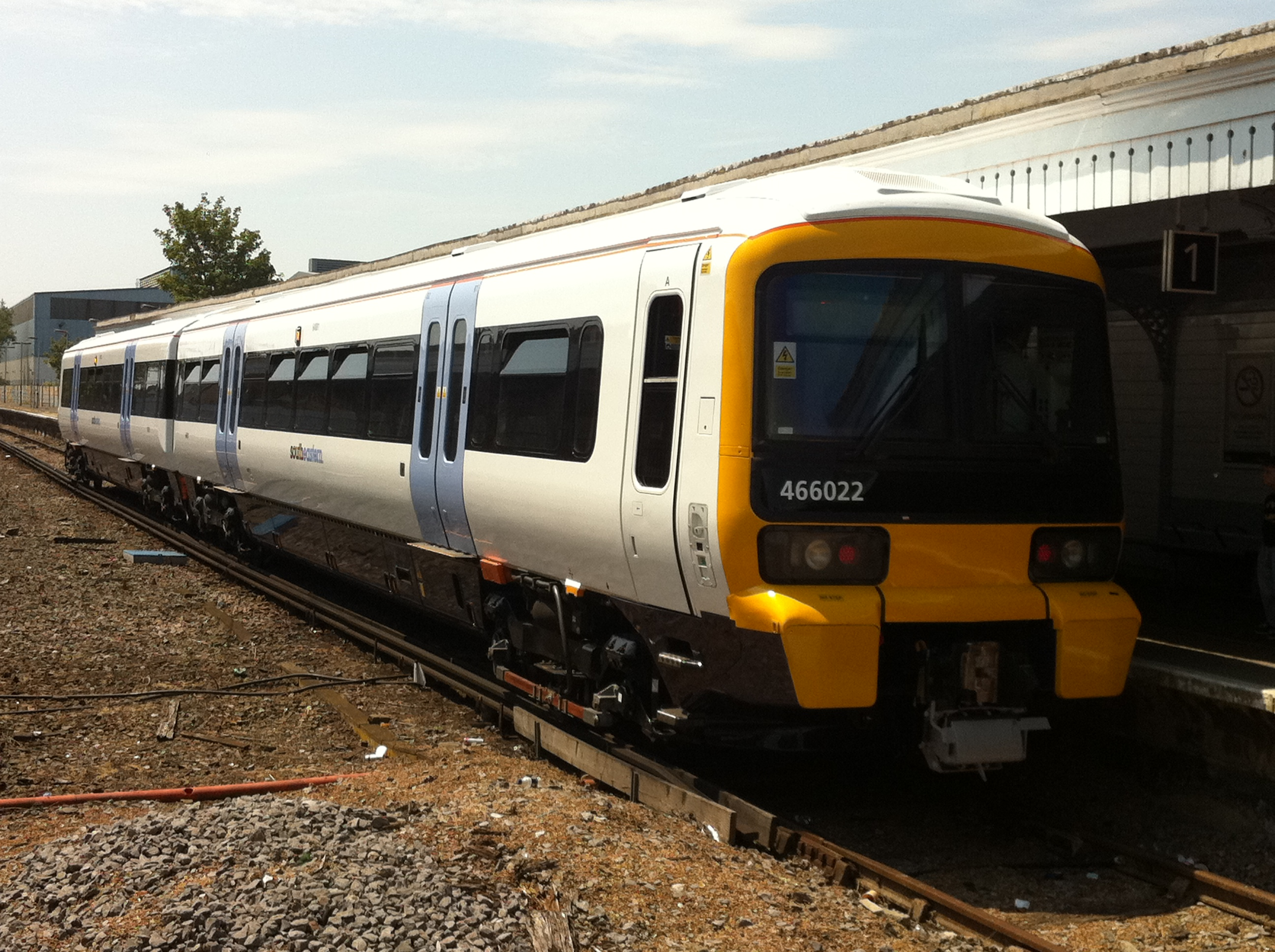
A Class 466 unit in Southeastern livery at Sheerness-on-Sea (2011)

The Class 466 EMUs were built between 1993 and 1994 by Metro-Cammell in Washwood Heath, for the Network SouthEast sector of British Rail. As part of the privatisation of British Rail, all were sold to Angel Trains. They were operated by Network SouthEast until 1996, then by Connex South Eastern until 2003, South Eastern Trains until 2006 and Southeastern to the present day.

Since 1 January 2021, Class 466 units can only operate in multiple with Class 465s, due to the units' non-compliance with modern accessibility standards. These provide six-car or 10-car suburban services out of Charing Cross, Cannon Street and Victoria main line stations to various destinations in south-east London and Kent.

Before this, however, they were also often used as individual units on branch lines, mainly:

- the Sheerness Line between Sittingbourne and Sheerness-on-Sea, displacing the Class 508/2s which operated on this branch line
- the Bromley North branch between Grove Park and Bromley North
- the Medway Valley line between Strood, Maidstone West and Paddock Wood.

During this time, they sometimes ran doubled-up to make four-car units, which helped reduce the poor adhesion along the line with single two-car units. The units have since been replaced on the Medway Valley line and the Sheerness line with Class 375 units (predominately the three-car variants) in 2012 and 2019 respectively. The units were replaced with four-car Class 465 units on the Bromley North line in January 2021.

These two-car EMUs are formed of a driving motor carriage (DMSO: Driving Motor Standard Open) and a driving trailer carriage (DTSOL, with lavatory); all on-board seating is standard accommodation. A Solid State Traction Converter package controls 3-phase AC Traction motors, which allows for Rheostatic or Regenerative Dynamic braking. Primary braking system is electro-pneumatically actuated disc brakes, which is blended with the dynamic brakes. Speed probes on every axle of the unit provide for Wheel Slip/Slide Protection. A solid-state Auxiliary Converter provides 110 V DC and 240 V AC supplies; this is the source of the loud whining noise, which can be heard when the train is stationary. The aux converter is located on the driving trailer, along with the toilet. The units use air-operated sliding plug doors.

=== Refurbishment ===
The 466s were repainted by Wabtec Rail at Doncaster Works into a variation of Southeastern livery with lilac doors and midnight blue lower band.

== Withdrawal ==
The first two Class 466 units to be put into storage were sent to Worksop in June 2021.

In early 2025, some of the Class 466 fleet began to be sent for scrapping.

== Preservation ==
In mid 2026 it was announced that 466043 had been preserved.

== Fleet details ==
Units:
Class	Operator	Qty.	Year built	Cars per unit	Unit numbers
466	Southeastern	16	1993–1994	2	466003, 466006, 466008, 466011, 466018–466019, 466021–466023, 466026, 466034–466035, 466038–466040, 466042
466	Preserved	1	1993–1994	2	466043
466	Scrapped	26	1993–1994	2	466001-466002, 466004–466005, 466007, 466009–465010, 466012–466017, 466020, 466024–466025, 465027–466033, 466036–466037, 466041

Vehicle number ranges:
DMSO	DTSOL
64860–64902	78312–78354

== Accidents and incidents ==
On 5 February 2007, a bridge inspection unit working on the M20 motorway was deployed over a railway bridge between Maidstone Barracks and Aylesford. The gantry on the bridge inspection unit was struck by 466041 working a Paddock Wood to Gillingham service, causing significant damage to the leading carriage and wrecking the gantry. The train driver and the sole passenger were slightly injured. Nobody was on the gantry at the time.

== Models ==
Hornby produced a ready-to-run model of the Class 466 between 1998-2012. It has a plastic body with a diecast chassis construction with directional lighting.
