= Connex South Eastern =

Train operating company in South East England

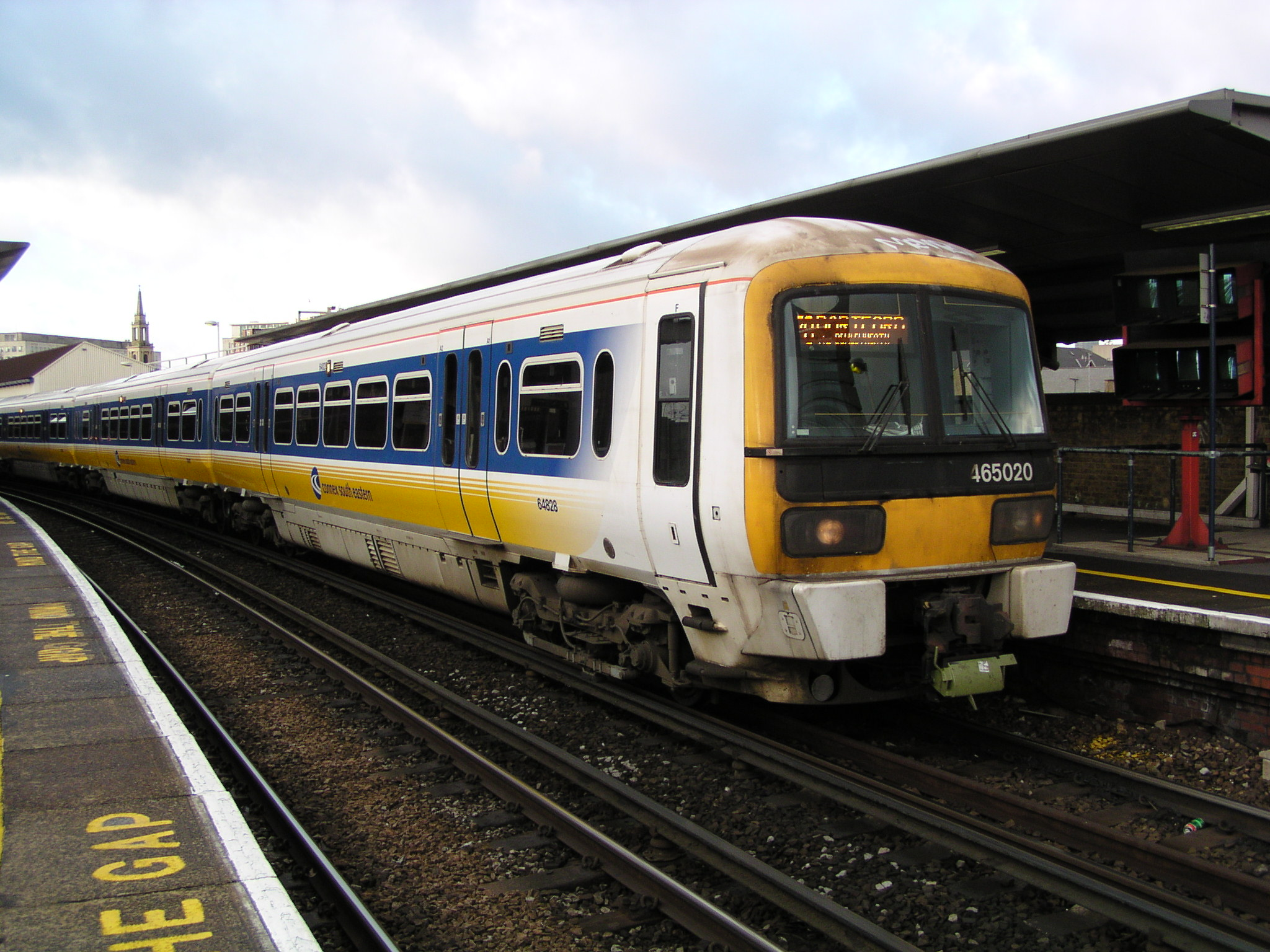
- Class 465 Networker at London Waterloo East in 2003

Overview
- Franchises: South Eastern; 13 October 1996 – 8 November 2003
- Main regions: Greater London, Kent
- Other regions: East Sussex, West Sussex, Surrey
- Fleet: approximately 350
- Stations called at: 178
- Parent company: Connex
- Reporting mark: CX
- Predecessor: Network SouthEast
- Successor: South Eastern Trains

Other
- Website: connex.co.uk at the Wayback Machine (archived 2001-04-05)

Connex South Eastern was a British train operating company owned by Connex that operated the South Eastern franchise from October 1996 until November 2003.

== History ==
On 13 October 1996 Connex commenced operating the South Eastern franchise having beaten bids from a Management/FirstBus consortium, GB Railways and Stagecoach.

In December 2002, after the franchise ran into financial trouble, the Strategic Rail Authority agreed to bail it out with a £58 million injection, with the franchise end date changed from 2011 to 2006. However continuing poor financial management resulted in the Strategic Rail Authority deciding to strip Connex of the franchise in June 2003. Connex South Eastern continued to operate the franchise until 8 November 2003 with the services transferring to the Strategic Rail Authority's South Eastern Trains subsidiary the following day.

== Services ==
Connex South Eastern ran passenger services from London Blackfriars, London Bridge, London Cannon Street, London Charing Cross and London Victoria to Hayes, Bromley North, Ramsgate, Dover Priory, Folkestone Harbour and Ore and various destinations within including Orpington, Sevenoaks, Dartford, Tunbridge Wells, Ashford and Canterbury West.

It also ran services between Sittingbourne and Sheerness; Paddock Wood, Maidstone West and Strood; and Maidstone West, Redhill and Three Bridges.

Services on the Addiscombe Line, which were operated by Connex South Eastern following privatisation, ceased in 1997. The line was subsequently converted for Tramlink operation.

== Rolling stock ==
Connex South Eastern inherited a large fleet of slam-door and power-door electric multiple units from Network SouthEast. The slam-door EMUs were Class 411s, Class 421s and Class 423s, built between 1956 and 1974, while the power-door EMUs were Class 365s, Class 465s and Class 466s, built between 1991 and 1995 as part of NSE's Networker family.

In 1998 Connex South Eastern leased twelve Class 508s from Angel Trains that were surplus to Merseyrail Electrics, to replace some of the elderly Class 411s.

Connex South Eastern ordered 10 three-carriage and 102 four-carriage Class 375s, and 36 five-carriage Class 376s in a couple of batches with the first entering service in April 2001.

Between 4 February and 20 March 2002, owing to a shortage of rolling stock, a preserved Class 201 Hastings unit was on loan to Connex South Eastern to operate two return journeys on Monday to Fridays between Charing Cross and Hastings.

Class	Image	Type	Number	Carriages	Built	Notes
365 Networker Express		EMU	16	4	1994–1995	
375 Electrostar		EMU	112	3 or 4	1999–2005	
411		EMU	112	4	1956–1963	
421		EMU	25	4	1964–1972	
423		EMU	73	4	1967–1974	
465 Networker		EMU	147	4	1991–1994	
466 Networker		EMU	43	2	1993–1994	
508		EMU	12	3	1979–1980	Transferred from Merseyrail

== Depots ==
Connex South Eastern's Networker fleet was maintained at Slade Green depot and the non-Networker fleet was maintained at the Ramsgate depot.

== See also ==
- Connex South Central, a sister company that also had its franchise terminated

Preceded by Network SouthEast; As part of British Rail	Operator of South Eastern franchise 1996–2003	Succeeded by South Eastern Trains
