= Govia =

British transport company

Govia Limited
- Type: Joint venture
- Industry: Public transport
- Founded: 1997
- Defunct: 2026
- Headquarters: Newcastle upon Tyne
- Area served: England
- Services: Train services
- Parent: Go-Ahead Group (65%); Keolis (35%)
- Subsidiaries: Thameslink; Southern; Southeastern; London Midland; Govia Thameslink Railway
- Website: govia.info

Govia Limited was a joint venture between Go-Ahead Group (65%) and Keolis (35%) that operated railway franchises in England between 1997 and 2026.

== History ==
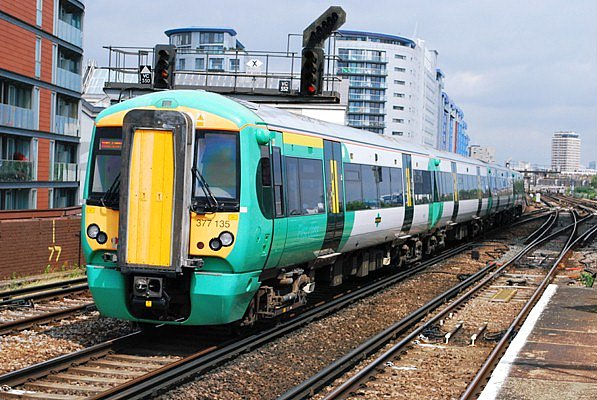
Southern Class 377 at Battersea Park station in June 2010

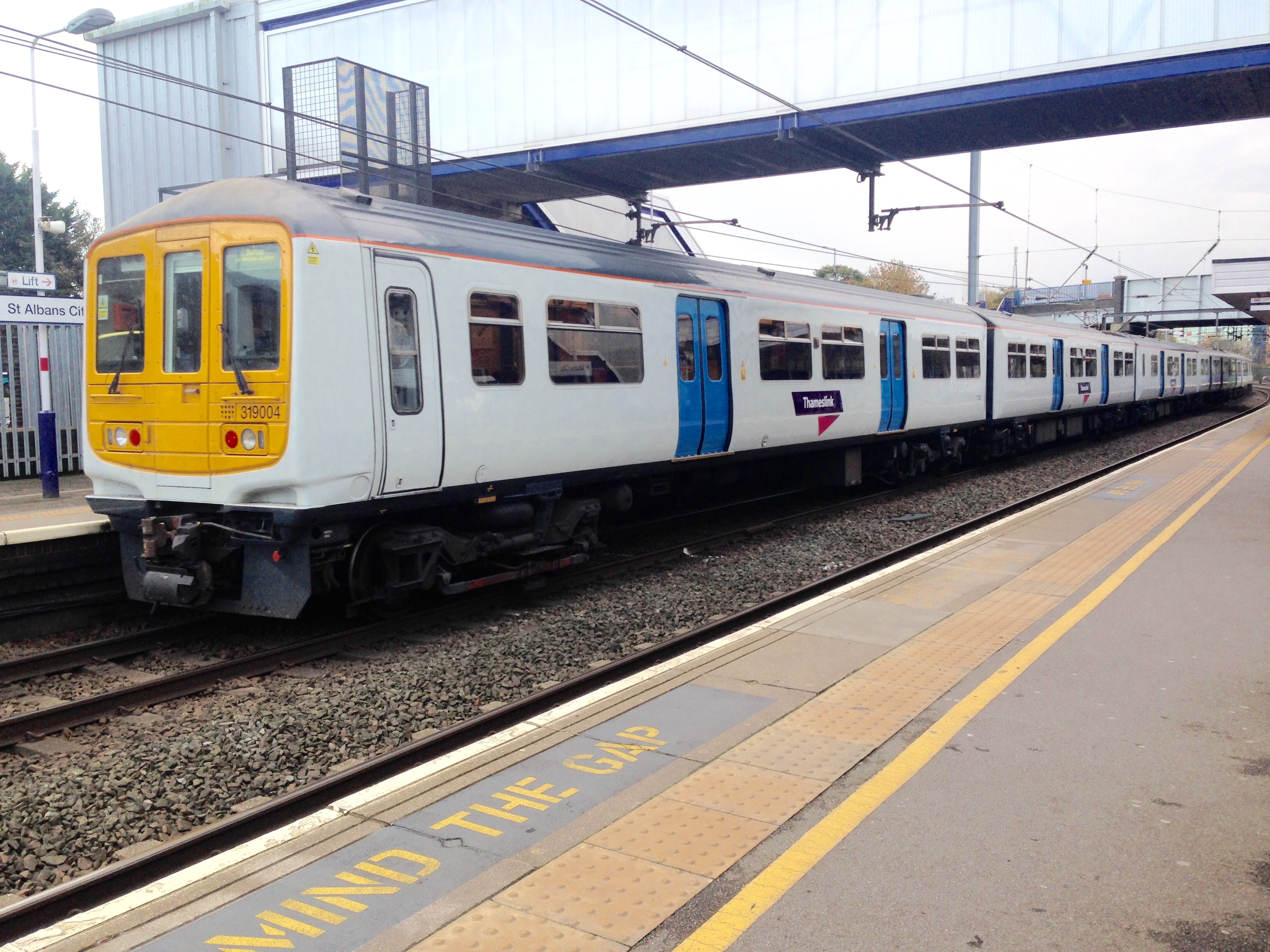
Thameslink Class 319 at St Albans station in November 2014

Go-Ahead Group formed a joint venture with Keolis that successfully bid to operate the Thameslink franchise with operations commencing on 2 March 1997. Upon being retendered, the franchise passed to First Capital Connect on 1 April 2006. Govia also unsuccessfully bid for the Regional Railways North West and ScotRail franchises.

In August 2001, Govia commenced operating the South Central franchise under the Southern brand. In April 2006, Southeastern commenced operating the South Eastern franchise. In November 2007, Govia commenced operating the London Midland franchise and in May 2014, the Govia Thameslink Railway franchise. Govia unsuccessfully bid for the Northern and TransPennine Express franchises in 2015.

== Operations ==
Govia ran rail franchises through the following companies:

- Thameslink from March 1997 until March 2006.
- Southern operating as Southern and Gatwick Express from August 2001 and June 2008 respectively until joining Govia Thameslink Railway in July 2015
- Southeastern operated the South Eastern franchise from Kent and East Sussex to London from April 2006 until October 2021
- London Midland on the West Coast Main Line and in the West Midlands from November 2007 until December 2017
- Govia Thameslink Railway operated the Thameslink, Southern and Great Northern franchise from September 2014 until May 2026 under the Southern, Gatwick Express, Thameslink and Great Northern brands from East and West Sussex, Surrey and parts of Kent and Hampshire, along with lines from Bedford, Peterborough and Kings Lynn to London.

== Other operations ==
The partners also lodged bids and operated other franchises separately. Keolis held a 45% shareholding in First TransPennine Express that operated from 2004 until 2016. In 2012, it bid for the InterCity West Coast franchise in partnership with SNCF. Keolis operated the Wales & Borders franchise from 2018 until 2021 through its shareholding in KeolisAmey Wales. Go-Ahead bid for the Greater Anglia franchise.

The partners also lodged an unsuccessful bid for the TransPennine Express franchise in 2015, but this was not done through the Govia joint venture, with Keolis holding a majority shareholding.
