= British Rail Class 423 =

Class of British electric multiple units

British Rail Class 423 (4 VEP)
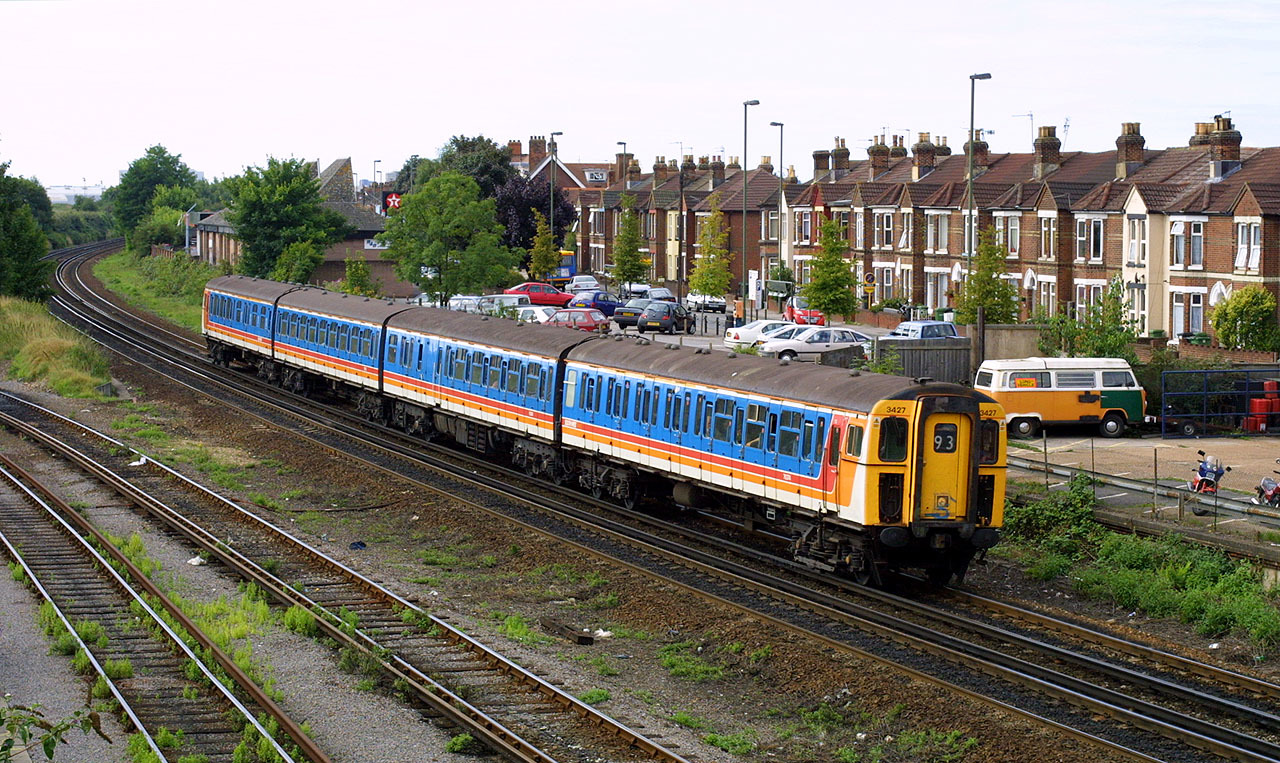
- Class 423/1 4 VEP 3427 at Eastleigh in 2001
- In service: 1967 – 26 November 2005
- Manufacturer: British Rail
- Order nos.: 30758 (DTCsoL, 76230-76269); 30759 (TSO, 70781-70800); 30760 (MBSO, 62121-62140); 30771 (DTCsoL, 76333-76402); 30772 (TSO, 70872-70906); 30773 (MBSO, 62182-62216); 30792 (DTCsoL, 76441-76540); 30793 (TSO, 70907-70956); 30794 (MBSO, 62217-62266); 30799 (DTCsoL, 76541-76560); 30800 (MBSO, 62267-62276); 30801 (TSO, 70957-70966); 30811 (DTCsoL, 76641-76716); 30812 (TSO, 70997-71034); 30813 (MBSO, 62317-62354); 30851 (MBSO, 62435-62475); 30852 (TSO, 71115-71155); 30853 (DTCsoL, 76861-76942)
- Built at: York Works; Derby Works
- Number built: 194
- Formation: 4 cars per trainset: DTCsoL+MBSO+TSO+DTCsoL
- Diagram: ED261 (MBSO); ED262 (MBSO); ED263 (MBSO, facelifted); ED266 (MBSO, facelifted); EE365 (DTCsoL); EE366 (DTCsoL); EE367 (DTCsoL); EE368 (DTCsoL); EE373 (DTCsoL, facelifted); EE281 (DCTsoL, modified); EH276 (TSO); EH278 (TSO); EH283 (TSO); EH291 (TSO, facelifted)
- Design code: 4 VEP
- Fleet numbers: 7701-7894 (sets, as built); (42)3001-(42)3194 (sets, 423/0); (42)3401-(42)3591 (sets, 423/1); (42)3801-(42)3812 (sets, 423/1); (42)3813-(42)3844 (sets, 423/8); (42)3901-(42)3919 (sets, 423/2); 76230-76942 (DTCsoL); 62121-62475 (MBSO); 70781-71155 (TSO)
- Capacity: 42F/280S (as built)
- Operators: British Rail; InterCity; Network SouthEast; Connex South Eastern; South Eastern Trains; Connex South Central; Southern; South West Trains
- Depots: Bournemouth; Brighton; East Wimbledon; Eastleigh; Fratton; Ramsgate

Specifications
- Car length: 66 ft 7 in (20.29 m)
- Width: 9 ft 3 in (2.82 m)
- Height: 12 ft 9 1/4 in (3.893 m)
- Doors: Hinged slam
- Maximum speed: 90 mph (145 km/h)
- Weight: 157.5 t (155.0 long tons; 173.6 short tons) (as built)
- Traction motors: EE507
- Power output: 1,000 hp (750 kW)
- Electric system: 750 V DC third rail
- Current collection: Contact shoe
- Coupling system: Drop-head buckeye
- Track gauge: 4 ft 8 1/2 in (1,435 mm) standard gauge

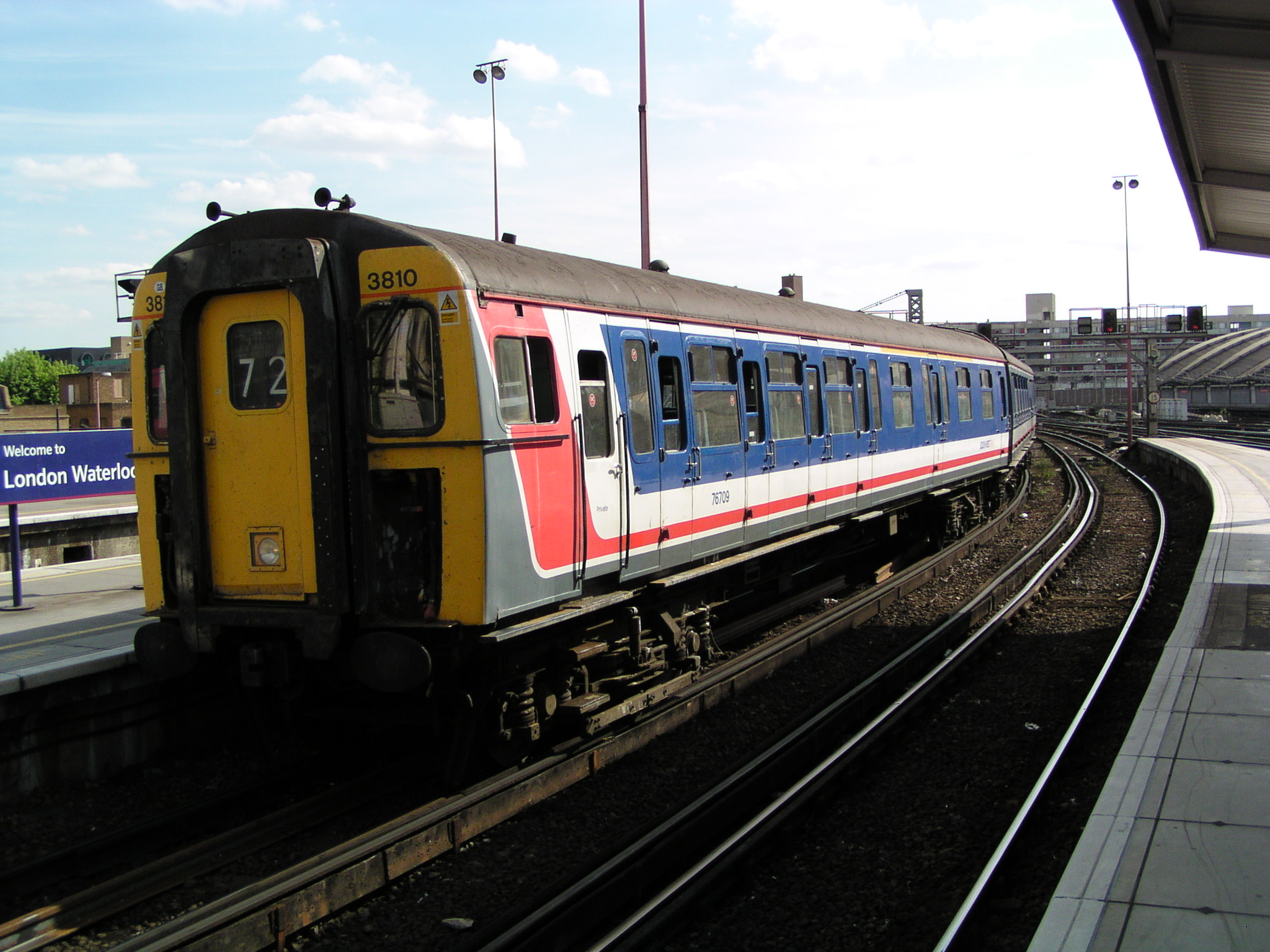
Class 423/1, No. 3810 arriving at London Waterloo in 2003. This unit was one of the last to carry Network SouthEast livery. It was nicknamed the "Great Escape" after it was exported to Germany for a while for testing. After a failed attempt to preserve it, the unit was scrapped.

The British Rail Class 423 (4 VEP), electric multiple unit passenger trains were mostly built by British Rail (BR) at York Works from 1967 to 1974, although the MBSOs and TSOs of the first 20, 7701-7720, were built at Derby Works. They have manually opening doors next to every seating row and were the last coaching stock built in this pattern for BR. They were mostly found working outer-suburban services in South London and rural services in Kent, Sussex and Hampshire, up to 2005 when they were finally replaced by Electrostar and Desiro units. The fleet had a working life of 38 years.

== Description ==
=== Standard units ===
Ordered in 1965, 194 standard four-car 4 VEP units were built between 1967 and 1974, numbered 7701-7894; subsequently becoming class 423 under TOPS. They were subsequently renumbered in the 1980s into the 30xx and 31xx series in order to make numbers TOPS compliant. Between 1988 and 1995 the units were internally facelifted. The work involved fitting fluorescent lighting and public address equipment, and also rebuilding the MBS (motor brake second) vehicles with an additional two bays of seating in space formerly used for luggage. On refurbishment only the first 20 units were renumbered in order, in the 34xx series. All other units were renumbered from 3421 onwards, in the order they were refurbished. All units ended up swapping motor vehicles on refurbishment - the additional work on these cars made the work take longer than that carried out on trailer vehicles.

=== 8 VAB unit ===
In 1968, due to a shortage of suitable stock for the Bournemouth electrification scheme, BR formed an eight-carriage 8 VAB unit, no. 8001. The unit was formed of carriages from three standard sets, nos. 7739/41/42, plus a conventional locomotive-hauled buffet carriage. Three MBSOs were required within the make-up as the standard 'TRB' was not through-wired for traction power distribution. In view of this the two MBSOs in the five-car portion had collector shoes fitted to one bogie on each. The unit worked on occasions with a 4TC; this usually had a Class 33 attached to provide ETH and train lighting in the TC unit, as the 8 VAB was not fitted with ETH jumper cables on the unit ends. Its normal running formation was with another 4 VEP to make a 12-car set. The 'TRB' vehicle retained its gas-powered appliances so, unlike 4 REP buffet cars, was able to provide hot food and beverages while on diversions away from third-rail areas. Adjacent MBSO 62203 had most of its doors locked out of use and tables fitted across them for the service of meals on a 2-and-2 basis (across seats intended for five persons normally); this vehicle also had most of its luggage racks removed. The unit was later reclassified as Class 480 following the introduction of TOPS.

The numbering of individual vehicles are shown in the table below.

Unit No.	DTCoL	MBSO	TRB	MBSO	DTCoL	DTCoL	MBSO	DTCoL
8001	76375	62203	1759	62200	76376	76373	62202	76374

The unit was disbanded in 1974, following deliveries of 4 REP stock, but one of the original units, no. 7739, was not reformed, as spare vehicles from the unit had replaced crash-damaged VEP vehicles in the meantime.

=== 4 VEG units ===
In 1978 12 units, nos. 7788-7799, were fitted with extra luggage racks by removing the squabs and cushions from certain seats and reclassified as Class 427 4 VEG units. The units were renumbered into the range 7901-7912 in the same sequence. These units were dedicated to the Gatwick Express services from London Victoria to Gatwick Airport. Externally these units were marked by an orange/yellow (dayglo) coloured band at cantrail level with lettering 'London-Gatwick express service'. They were used on Victoria to Bognor Regis services attached at the rear from Victoria and detached at Gatwick Airport so that airline passengers did not have to rush to get off the train. The unit then attached to the front of an Up Bognor Regis service back to Victoria.

In 1984 they were replaced on this service by Class 73 electro-diesel locomotives operating in push-pull with Class 488 coaching sets and Class 489 luggage vans. The twelve units were then converted back to standard sets, and regained their original unit numbers.

=== Vehicle numbering ===
The numbering of individual vehicles and details of when units were built are shown in the table below.

Unit Nos.	Years Built	DTCsoL	MBSO	TSO	DTCsoL
7701-7720	1967	76231-76269 (odd)	62121-62140	70781-70800	76230-76268 (even)
7721-7755	1967-68	76333-76401 (odd)	62182-62216	70872-70906	76334-76402 (even)
7756-7805	1968-69	76441-76539 (odd)	62217-62266	70907-70956	76442-76540 (even)
7806-7815	1970	76541-76559 (odd)	62267-62276	70957-70966	76542-76560 (even)
7816-7853	1970-73	76641-76715 (odd)	62317-62354	70997-71034	76642-76716 (even)
7854-7894	1973-74	76861-76941 (odd)	62435-62475	71115-71155	76862-76942 (even)

== Final operations ==
Following the privatisation of British Rail the three southern train operators all inherited large fleets of 4 VEP units. A franchise commitment of all operators was to replace all of the units, along with all other Mark 1 rolling stock, by the end of 2005, as the units did not meet modern health and safety requirements. The fleet of each franchise is described below.

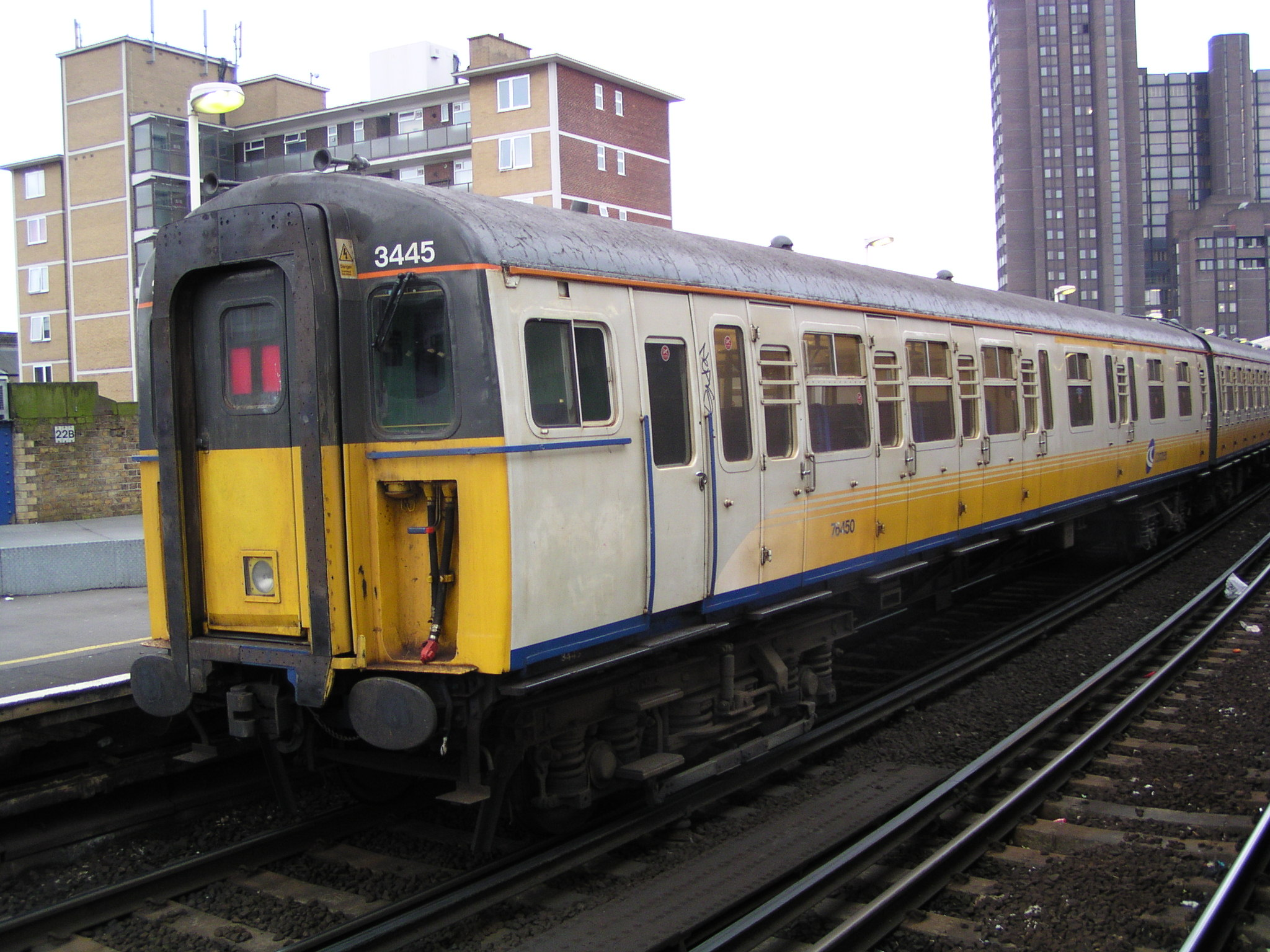
Class 423/1, no. 3445 at Waterloo East in 2003, with a service to Charing Cross. This unit is painted in Connex South Eastern livery.

=== South Eastern Trains ===
South Eastern Trains operated the largest fleet of 4 VEP units. The franchise was originally operated as Connex South Eastern, which lost the franchise in 2003. The fleet contained several unusual units, including no. 3473, which contained a driving trailer with the compartments removed, and no. 3582, which contained former 4TC driving trailer 76275.

Many units survived into 2005 because of the closure of the Folkestone—Dover section of railway for tunnel refurbishment. This ended in September 2005. The final passenger service was operated on 7 October 2005, using units 3565, 3545 and 3568.

All the South Eastern Trains 4 VEP units are withdrawn. One driving trailer from unit 3568, and another from unit 3545, have been claimed by the National Railway Museum, and the former 4TC driving trailer from unit 3582 have been preserved.

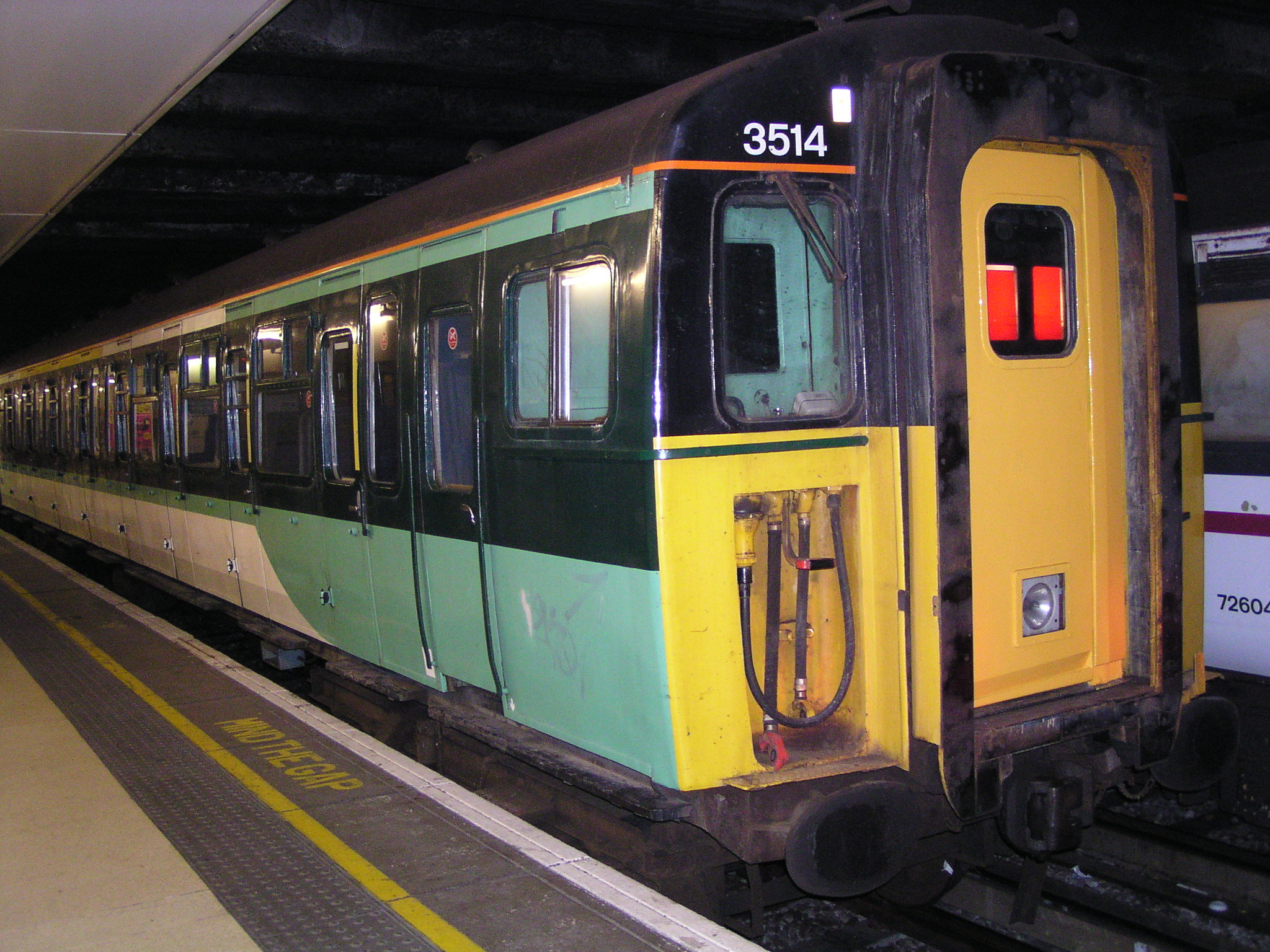
Class 423/1, no. 3514 at London Victoria in 2003. This was the only unit to be painted in Southern's green livery and was one of the last units still in traffic with Southern.

=== South Central/Southern ===
The Network SouthCentral division inherited a fleet of 50 standard Class 423/1 units. The franchise was originally won by Connex South Central, which soon applied its yellow and white livery to the fleet. However, following poor levels of service and financial mismanagement, the franchise was transferred to South Central Trains in 2000, which was later renamed as Southern in 2004. Only one unit, no. 3514, was ever repainted in Southern's green livery.

In 1998-1999, whilst still under the control of Connex, 19 units were modified to operate inner suburban South London "Metro" services. The work involved removal of internal compartments and declassification of first class seating. The units were reclassified as Class 423/9, or 4 VOP, and renumbered in the range 3901-3919. Due to the lack of first class seating and toilets, these units were generally not used on long-distance services.

In 2003, with the general run-down of slam door trains, it was decided to reform some of the 4 VOP units by swapping one driving trailer with that from a standard unit, the standard units gaining the ex 4 VOP driving trailer. The new hybrid units were reclassified as Class 423/8 (or 4 VIP) and renumbered in the range 3813-3844. This was to give all units some first class seating, thus making diagramming of units easier. But in the event only eight units were reformed, namely nos. 3813/14/21/22/41-44.

By 2004 Southern had started to introduce Class 377 "Electrostar" units into service. Although first introduced in 2002, this did not initially affect the Class 423 as the older 'Phase 1' Class 421 4 CIG units were withdrawn first, due to their age and lower seating capacity. However, as more new units entered traffic, the first Class 423 units were withdrawn. Units selected for withdrawal were usually those with high mileage or in poor condition. By mid-2005 only a handful of units remained in traffic. The final diagrammed passenger service out of London was the 17:17 London Victoria to Eastbourne and Seaford on 19 August 2005, formed of units 3486 and 3535, plus 4 CIG unit 1866. Six units were subsequently retained for emergency cover. Unit 3514 was used on the Sussex Slammer railtour on Saturday 19 November 2005.

The following Saturday saw the final slam door trains on Southern, when units 3490, 3505 and 3535 formed the 09:19 Brighton to London Victoria and 11:06 London Victoria to Brighton services (via Lewes due to engineering works); this being the last scheduled mainline passenger service using southern-electric slam-door stock (the very last passenger being an off-duty HM Inspector of Railways). Following this trip the stock was withdrawn from service and initially put into Lover's Walk depot before being moved (under its own power) to Battersea Stewart's Lane Depot (road 12) from where it was hauled away at 12:26hrs on 3 January 2006 by a class 47 locomotive for scrapping.

One complete 4 VIP unit has been preserved, and two 4 VOP units remained in departmental use until March 2013.

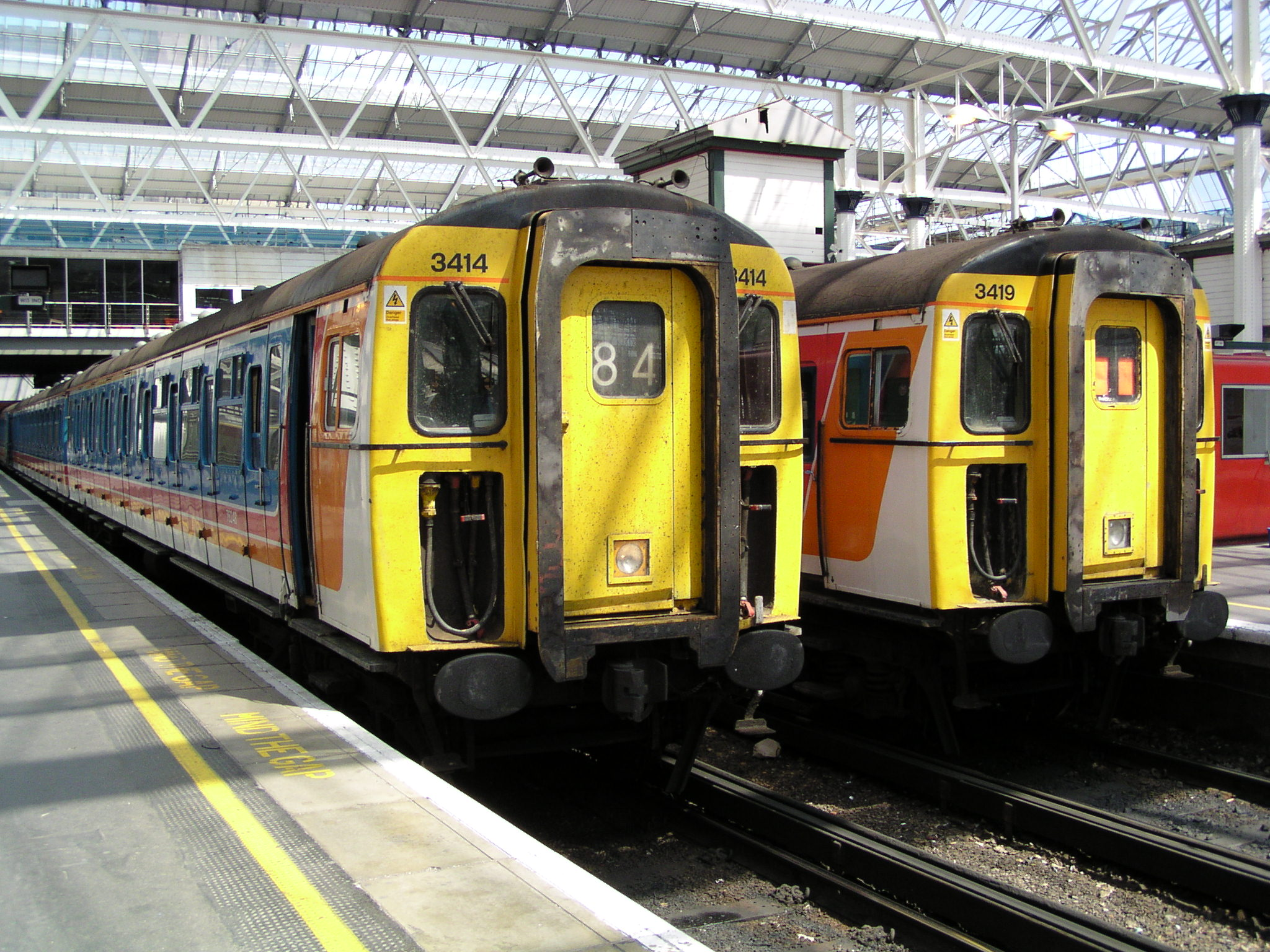
Class 423/1, nos. 3414 and 3419 at London Waterloo in 2003. These units are painted in South West Trains livery. They have both since been withdrawn and scrapped.

=== South West Trains ===
South West Trains (SWT) inherited the second-largest number of units, with an initial fleet size of 62 units. The entire fleet was composed of standard Class 423/1 units. Later, a further four units (nos. 3809-3812) were transferred from Connex South Eastern. These were also standard units, but were numbered in the 38xx series to denote they were leased from Porterbrook rather than HSBC Rail.

SWT quickly repainted its fleet of units into a new livery, based on the previous Network SouthEast (NSE) livery, but with the addition of an orange stripe and the absence of the grey band. All but four units (3415 and 3809–3811) were repainted. These four units were deliberately retained in NSE livery, meaning that in the final days of slam-door trains they attained "celebrity" status among rail enthusiasts.

In 2001, SWT placed an order for 785 new carriages with Siemens to allow it to replace its fleet of slam-door trains, in accordance with its franchise commitment to do so by 2005. To assist Siemens in the design of third rail units, 4 VEP no. 3810 was transferred to a test site in Germany to undergo tests. Following its return to Britain, it became popularly known as the "Great Escape".

South West Trains started to replace its slam-door fleet from early 2004, with the introduction of the first Class 444 and Class 450 Desiro units. Around this time, SWT repainted one unit, no. 3417, into its original BR Blue livery to commemorate the final months in traffic of the slam-door fleet. This unit was chosen because it was one of the last to receive major works attention, and therefore had the longest life-expectancy. It was named Gordon Pettitt after a former manager of the Southern Region of British Railways.

In the final months of traffic several units, including the first-built, no. 3401, were reformed in order to allow the vehicles in the best condition to be retained in service. Withdrawals of units picked up pace, with several large culls of units, the last of which occurred in March 2005. Beyond this date, only a handful of units remained in traffic, namely nos. 3401/17/81 3516/20/36/76 and 3811. The final normal passenger service was operated on 26 May 2005 from London Waterloo to Bournemouth, using 4 VEP 3536 sandwiched between 4 CIG units 1396 and 1398. Following withdrawal, most units were rapidly towed away for scrap. The "celebrity" blue unit, no. 3417, has since been sold to the Bluebell Railway.

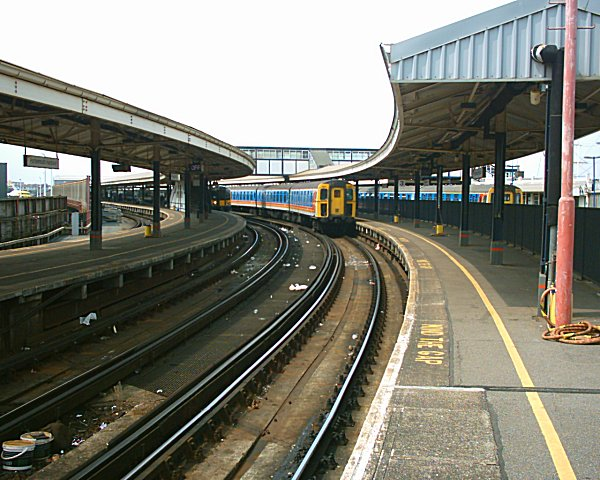
Old meets new: A Class 423 next to a Class 444 at Portsmouth Harbour.

== Further use ==
Following withdrawal from normal service, several vehicles have seen further use in departmental service.

- 4 VOP units 3905 and 3918 were converted into tractor units. They were used to haul Class 375 units to and from Ashford Works.
- MBSO 62138 (ex-unit 3567) was renumbered to 977981 and was used as a motor coach in the Hitachi V-Train no. 960201 during third-rail testing. It has since been scrapped.

== Accidents and incidents ==
- On 26 January 1985, units 7754 and 7703 formed a train with 4 CIG unit 7395 which was halted by a landslip at Popham, Hampshire and was run into by Class 33 locomotive 33 104 due to the traincrew failing to protect the rear of the stranded train. Twelve people were injured. The Class 33 was written off.
- On 6 November 1985, unit 7724 collided with 4 CIG unit 7390 at Copyhold Junction, near Haywards Heath, West Sussex due to a lack of braking and poor rail adhesion. Forty people were injured.
- On 12 December 1988, a train comprising units 3033, 3119 and 3005 formed the 07:18 Basingstoke - Waterloo service which was run into by the 06:14 Poole - Waterloo service, formed of 4 REP unit 2003 and 4TC units 8027 and 8025 at Clapham Junction. An empty stock working comprising units 3004 and 3425 running in the opposite direction on an adjacent line was struck by the derailed trains. Thirty-five people were killed, nearly 500 were injured.
- On 4 March 1989, unit 3441 is run into by a passenger train comprising 4 CIG units 1280 and 1295, which had overrun signals at Purley, Surrey. Five people were killed and 88 were injured.
- On 1 August 1990, Class 119 diesel multiple unit L576 collided with a passenger train comprising 4 VEP units 3508 & 3504, and 4 CIG unit 1304 at Reading due to overrunning signals. Forty people were injured.

== Remaining unpreserved units/coaches ==
Unit Number (current in bold)				Type	DTCsoL	MBSO	TSO	DTCsoL	Livery	Location	Notes
7753	3053	3463	**3905**	4 VOP	-	62266	-	-	Connex	LSL Crewe	
7799	3099	3532	**3918**	4 VOP	-	62321	-	-	BR Green	Barrow Hill	Rampart Engineering offices
7799	3099	3532	**3918**	4 VOP	76528	-	-	76527	Connex	Allelys Studley	

== Preservation ==
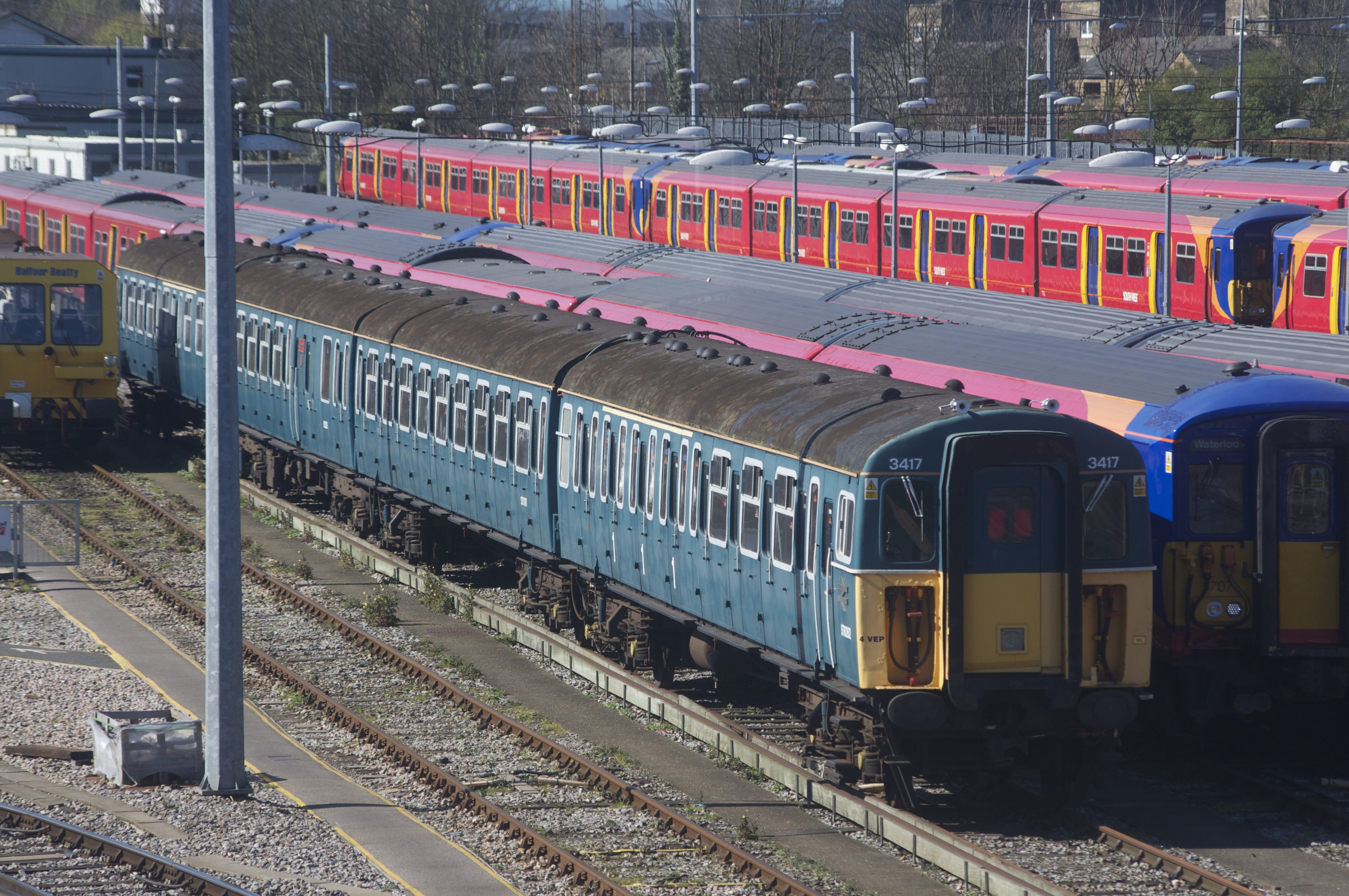
3417 in Clapham Yard in 2014.

So far two complete units (highlighted in table below) and two individual driving trailers have been preserved. In addition the former 4TC driving vehicle from set 3582 has been preserved.

The more high-profile unit preserved is the former South West Trains (SWT) "celebrity" unit painted in BR blue livery with painted aluminium window frames, no. 3417. The unit was initially used on Wimbledon depot as a shunter, but with SWT needing to get it off its books it was sold to the Bluebell Railway for the nominal sum of £1. It was moved to Eastleigh Works for storage, after having been used initially as the centrepiece for the Bluebell in a ceremony at East Grinstead railway station to mark the commencement of work at the station site as part of the line's work on the northern extension. The unit returned to East Grinstead for further use and storage in September 2010. In late April, the unit sustained minor damage to its shoegear as it was being driven from sidings at Clapham Junction Yard prior to movement under tow to the Swanage Railway. This resulted in the traction current being discharged in the yard whilst repairs were carried out. The unit was then moved back into the sidings and then dragged to Swanage the following day. The unit was for some time stabled in the open at Clapham Junction, having previously been stored in the shed at the yard. The unit was then moved to Ilford as part of a deal brokered by the unit's support group for a full repaint. After the completion of this bodywork restoration, it was transferred to Strawberry Hill in South West London where the interior underwent long-term refurbishment by volunteers from the Southern Electric Traction Group. It was returned to the National Rolling Stock Library on 16 January 2024.

The second set, no. 3905, was turned into a tractor unit before being used for spares by the 5 BEL Trust to restore a 5 BEL set. It was donated for preservation and was stored at the Dartmoor Railway. In 2016 the termination of lease by Dartmoor Railway meant the unit would leave the railway and find a new home at the East Kent Railway in Sheperdswell.

One other set, no. 3822, was briefly preserved until 2010 when it was scrapped. It was located at the Churnet Valley Railway and was partially restored. In 2008 half of the set was returned to as-built BR Blue and received internal repairs. The other half remained in "as withdrawn" Connex condition, and the set operated at several special events throughout that year.

There was an attempt to preserve unit 3810 (the unit that was briefly exported to Germany), but this failed and ultimately it was scrapped.

Unit number (current in bold)				Type	DTCsoL	MBSO	TSO	DTCsoL	Livery	Location	Notes
7717	3017	**3417**	-	4 VEP	76262	62236	70797	76263	BR Blue	Bluebell Railway	Owned by the Bluebell Railway. Originally delivered to East Grinstead. Moved to Eastleigh March 2009, returned to the Bluebell Railway September 2010. Following restoration work at Ilford depot the unit has been moved to Strawberry Hill Depot in December 2015. Main-line certified.
7753	3053	3463	**3905**	4 VOP	76397	-	70904	76398	Connex	East Kent Railway	Privately Owned, was stored at Dartmoor Railway until 5/17 Where it was moved to the East Kent Railway and is formed with the MBSO from 1399 to complete a 4 car set.
7861	3161	**3545**	-	4 VEP	76875	-	-	-	BR Blue/Grey	East Kent Railway	3545 was one of the final units in traffic with South Eastern Trains. Acquired by the East Kent Railway and is carrying passengers once again.
7867	3167	**3568**	-	4 VEP	76887	-	-	-	Connex	Mizens Railway	3568 was one of the final units in traffic with South Eastern Trains. On 27 April 2006 driving trailer 76886 was moved by road to Mizens Railway in Woking. A platform and protective roof has been constructed over the coach to allow access and protect it from the rain. Can be externally viewed on days when Mizens Railway is operational however internal viewing is only available on selected open days.
404	3169	**3582**	-	4 VEP	76275	-	-	-	BR Blue & Grey	Swanage Railway	To become a part of the 4-TC's group TC.

== Fleet details ==
Original-condition units

Class	Type	No. built (Converted*)	Year built (Converted*)	No. range	Withdrawn	Notes
**Class 423**	4 VEP	194	1967-74	7701-7894 (later 3001-3035; 3037-3038; 3040-3194)	1995	Most units facelifted and renumbered into 3401-3591 range.
**Class 427**	4 VEG	12*	1978*	7901-7912	1984	Previously units 7788-7799. Converted back to standard 4 VEP units.
**Class 480**	8 VAB	1*	1968*	8001	1974	Formed from vehicles from units 7739/41/42. 7741/42 converted back to standard 4 VEP units.

Facelifted units

Class	Type	No. Converted	Year Converted	No. range	Operator	Units nos.	Withdrawn	No. preserved
Class 423/1	4 VEP	191	1988-95	3401-3591	SET	3412/16/21-24/45-54/71-75/87/91-99, 3500/11/21/43-45/47/48/53/54/60, 3562/64-66/68/70-75/77/79/82-91	10/2005	2
Class 423/1	4 VEP	191	1988-95	3401-3591	Southern	3403/35-37/79/82-86/88-90, 3501/03-05/12/13/15/17/18/23/24, 3529-31/35/46/49/51	11/2005	2
Class 423/1	4 VEP	191	1988-95	3401-3591	SWT	3401/02/04-11/13-15/17-20/25-34/55-59/66-70, 3480/81, 3508-10/16/19/20/36/39/40/42, 3552/55/57-59/61/63/67/69/76/78/80/81	05/2005	2
Class 423/1	4 VEP	12	1995	3801-3812	SET	3801-08	12/2004	-
Class 423/1	4 VEP	12	1995	3801-3812	SWT	3809-12	05/2005	-
Class 423/8	4 VIP	8	2003	3813-3844	Southern	3813/14/21/22/41-44	08/2005	-
Class 423/9	4 VOP	19	1998-99	3901-3919	Southern	3901-19	08/2005	1

== Modelling ==
Hornby produce the 4 VEP model in OO gauge. The model represents the main 2 variations:

1. **Original units** - with the full brake area in the MBS;
2. **Refurbished units** - as undertaken from 1988 onwards, with a reduced brake compartment replaced with extra seating bays.
