= Gillingham EMUD =

Railway maintenance depot in Gillingham, Kent

Gillingham EMU depot
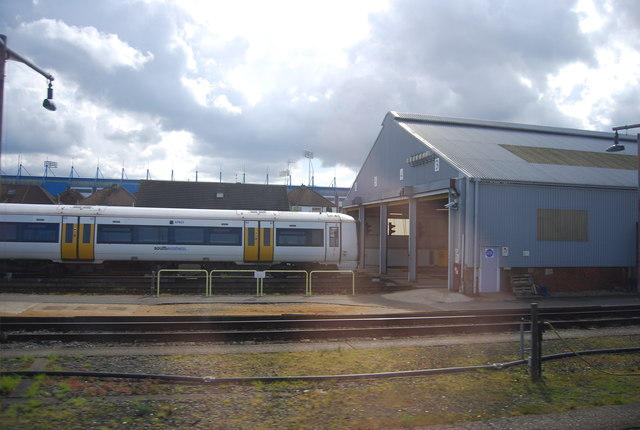
- Gillingham depot in 2012
- Interactive map of Gillingham EMU depot

Location
- Location: Gillingham, Kent
- Coordinates: 51.386°N 0.5614°E
- OS grid: TQ783683

Characteristics
- Owner: Southeastern
- Depot code: GI (1973 -)
- Type: EMU

History
- Opened: 1885

Gillingham EMUD is a train maintenance depot located in Gillingham, Kent, England. The depot is situated on the Chatham Main Line just east of Gillingham station.

The depot code is GI.

Class 466/0s are maintained at Gillingham with 1 Class 376/0 sent to the depot every weekend for maintenance. Both Metro and Mainline trains also receive light maintenance, making the depot quite versatile.

== Allocation ==
As of 2020, the depot's allocation consists of Southeastern Class 465/0/1/2/9 and 466/0 Networkers, Class 375/3/6/7/8/9, Class 376/0 and Class 377/1/5 Electrostars, also Thameslink Class 700s. The depot primarily maintains Class 466/0 Networkers and Class 376/0 Metro Electrostars.
