= Brockley railway station =

National rail station in London, England

Brockley
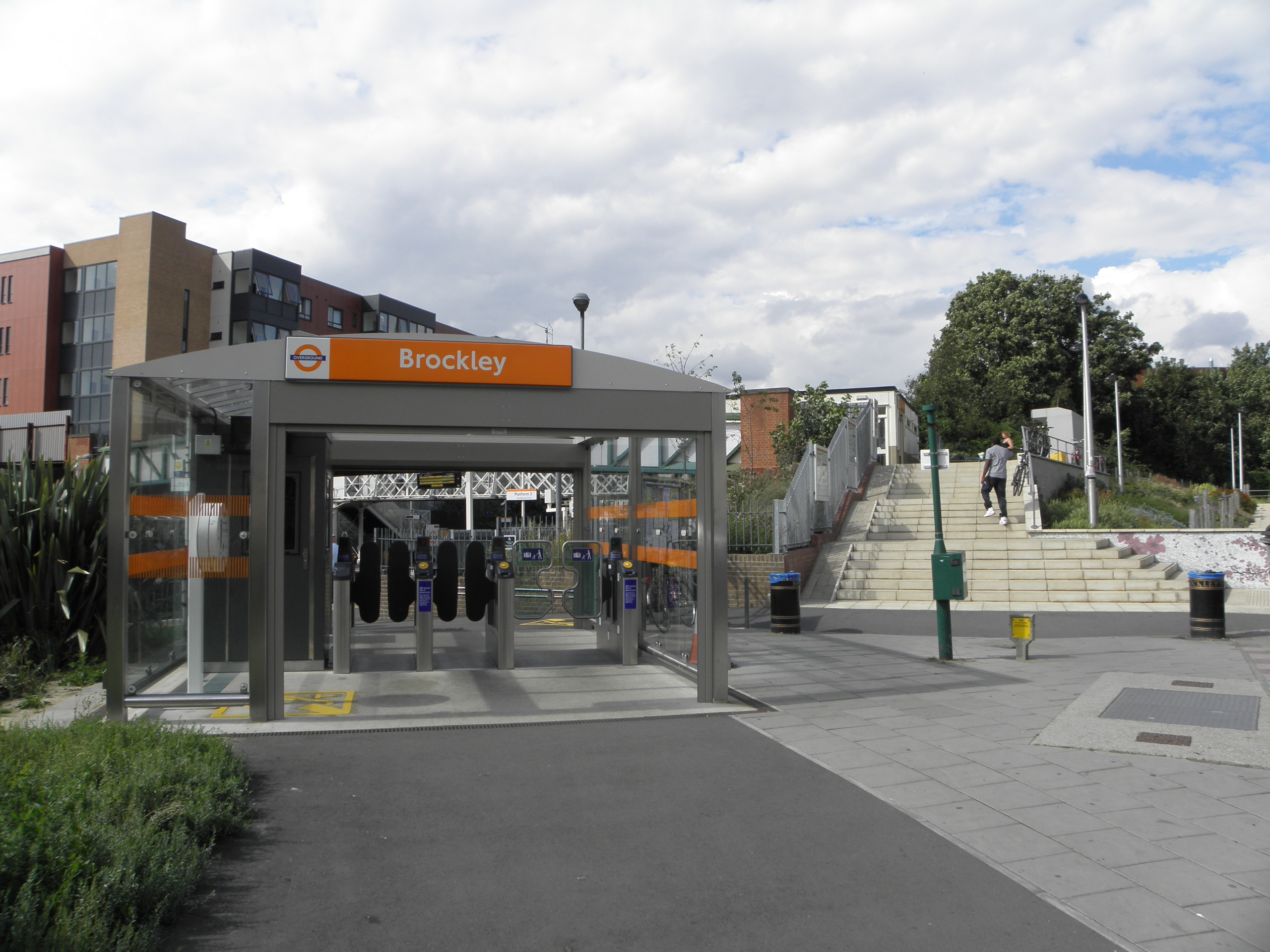
- Interactive map of Brockley

General information
- Location: Brockley
- Local authority: Lewisham
- Managed by: London Overground
- Owner: Network Rail
- Station code: BCY
- DfT category: D
- Number of platforms: 2
- Tracks: 4
- Accessible: Yes
- Fare zone: 2

National Rail annual entry and exit
- 2020–21: ▼1.189 million
- 2021–22: ▲2.662 million
- 2022–23: ▲3.331 million
- 2023–24: ▲3.670 million
- 2024–25: ▼3.668 million

Key dates
- 6 March 1871: Opened

Other information
- External links: Departures; Facilities
- Coordinates: 51.4645°N 0.0369°W

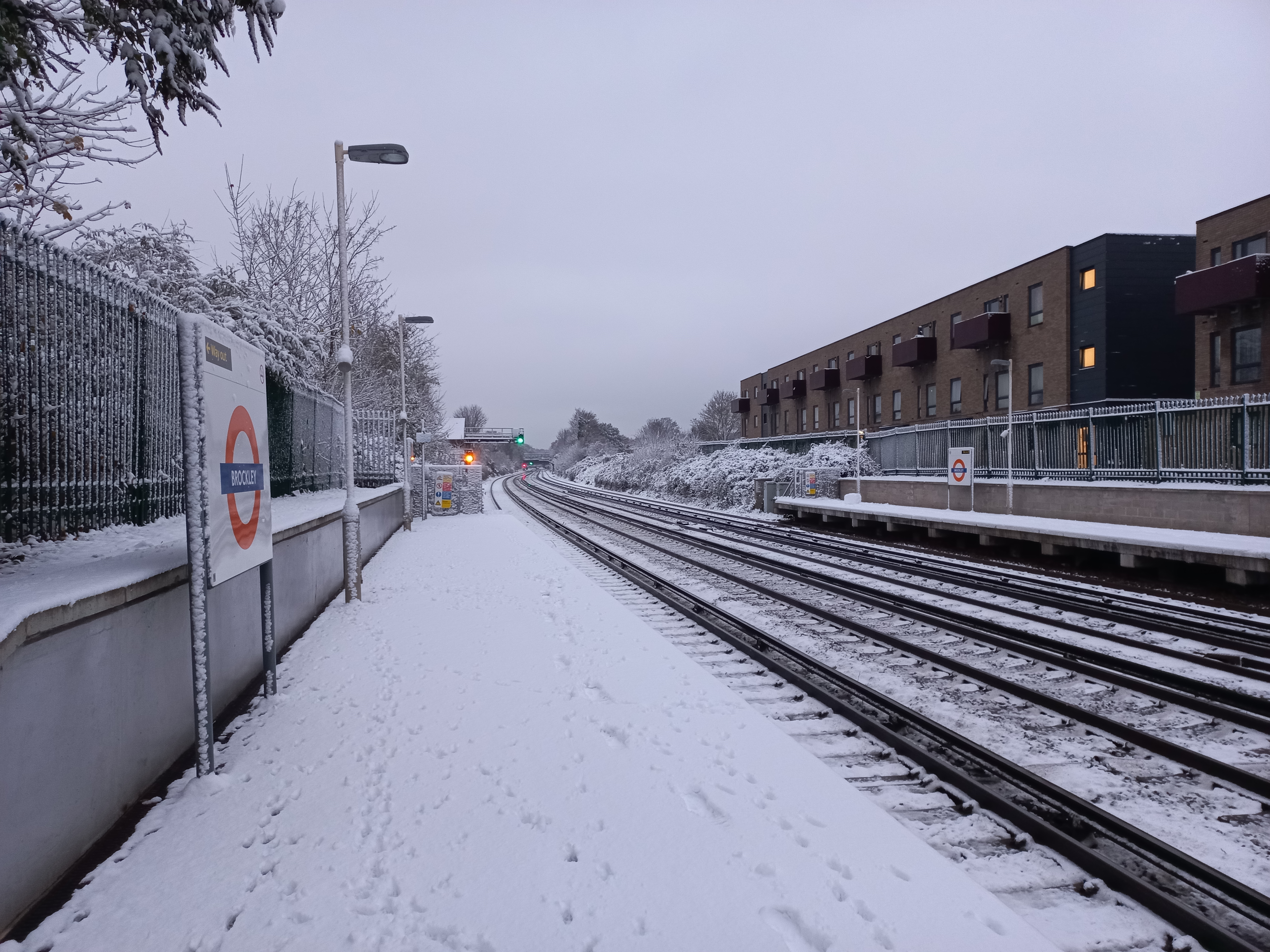
The station after a night of heavy snowfall, facing southbound from platform 2.

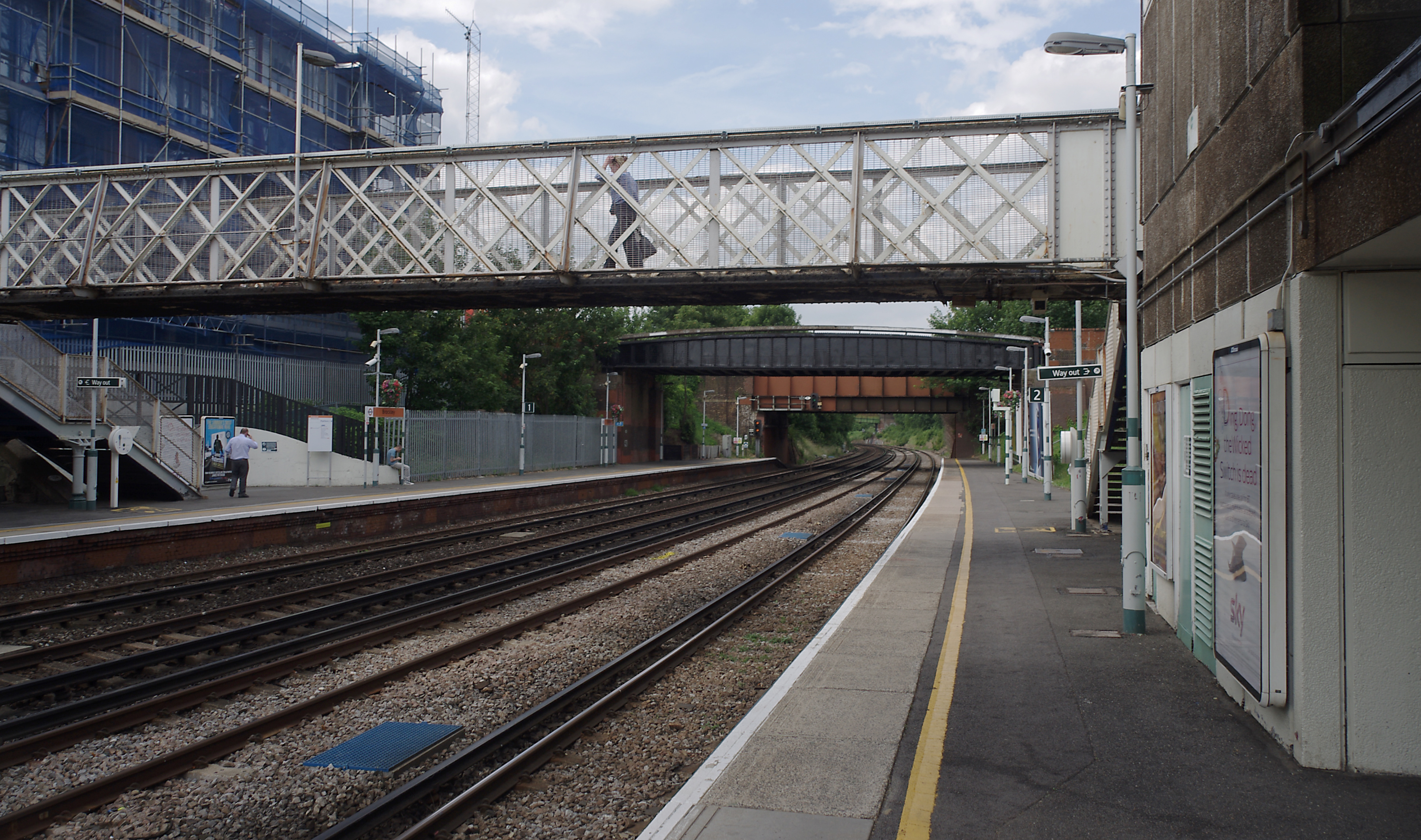
View of the station facing north in 2012

Brockley is a station on the main railway line between London Bridge and Brighton, 3 miles 56 chains (3.70 miles, 5.95 km) down the line from London Bridge. It is in London fare zone 2. It is served by suburban services of London Overground (Windrush line) and National Rail (Southern). It is located in Brockley in south-east London.

== History ==
The line was part of the London and Croydon Railway which opened in 1839. The station was opened on 6 March 1871. The original station buildings were demolished in the 1970s and new buildings erected. The platforms are only located on the outer, Slow lines, since the station is only served by London Overground trains between Highbury and Islington and West Croydon or Crystal Palace, local trains between London Bridge and Coulsdon Town and by the London Bridge to London Victoria loop line via Crystal Palace, plus some London Bridge to Guildford and Dorking in peak times.

Brockley forms part of the new southbound extension of the East London line (now the Windrush line) that opened on 23 May 2010 and forms part of the London Overground network. Ticket barriers were installed at this time.

Adjacent to Brockley station was sited Brockley Lane station which closed to passengers in 1917 with the original London, Chatham and Dover Railway branch to Greenwich Park. The connection of that line to Lewisham is a later development. Neither of these other lines has a physical connection with Brockley station, despite the trains running over the station. The possibility of opening platforms on this line with direct access to Victoria Station and the Bexleyheath Line to Dartford has often been suggested. A proposal to create a new Brockley Interchange, linking the existing station to the Nunhead to Lewisham line with new platforms at the former Brockley Lane station, is included in the London Borough of Lewisham's 2019–2041 transport strategy. The document gives an approximate date of 2030 and states that funding from TfL and Network Rail would be needed for the project. The document states that TFL is to provide an estimated cost.

== Services ==
Brockley is on the Windrush line of the London Overground, with services operated using Class 378 EMUs. Additional services are operated by Southern using Class 377 EMUs.

The typical off-peak service in trains per hour is:

- 2 tph to London Bridge
- 8 tph to Highbury & Islington via Surrey Quays (Windrush line)
- 2 tph to London Victoria via Streatham Hill
- 4 tph to Crystal Palace (Windrush line)
- 4 tph to West Croydon (Windrush line)

The station is also served by a single early morning and late evening service to East Croydon via Norwood Junction, with the early morning service continuing to Tattenham Corner and Caterham.

Preceding station	National Rail	Following station
New Cross Gate	Southern Brighton Main Line Stopping Services	Honor Oak Park
Preceding station	London Overground	Following station
New Cross Gate towards Highbury & Islington	Windrush line East London line	Honor Oak Park towards Crystal Palace or West Croydon

== Connections ==
London Buses routes 171, 172, 484 and night route N171 serve the station.
