= Lewisham Road railway station =

Former railway station in England

Lewisham Road
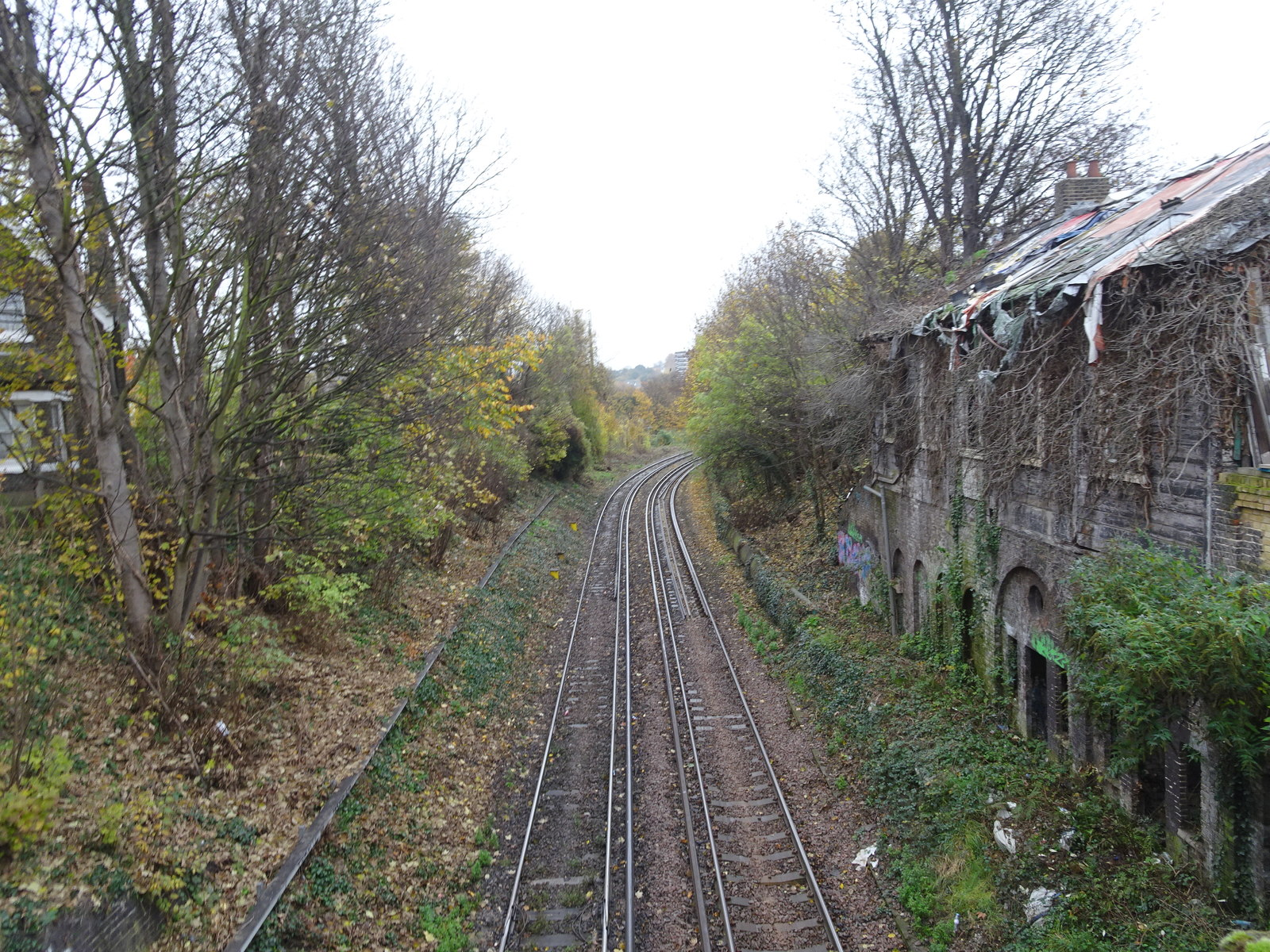
- The site of the station in 2018
- Interactive map of Lewisham Road

General information
- Location: Lewisham
- Owner: London, Chatham and Dover Railway
- Number of platforms: 2

Key dates
- 18 September 1871: Opened
- 1 January 1917: Closed

Other information
- Coordinates: 51.4677°N 0.0229°W

Lewisham Road was a railway station in Lewisham, south-east London, opened in 1871 by the London, Chatham and Dover Railway (LCDR) on a branch line from Nunhead to Greenwich Park.

It was situated on Loampit Hill, very close to the present-day St. Johns station. Although the branch line was intended to rival the South Eastern Railway's line through Greenwich it was probably the competition from this which contributed to the low use of the LCDR's branch, which closed in 1917 as a wartime economy measure. The line through the station was reopened for freight traffic in 1929 and passengers in 1935 to a new connecting spur via a flyover to Lewisham.

The station building remains today as a salvage shop; the platforms have been removed but some structures remain at this level on the London-bound side. To the east of the station beyond the spur to Lewisham most traces of the branch have been removed and extensively built over, but a short stretch of embankment forms part of Brookmill Road Nature Reserve just to the north of the spur.

An application to demolish the building and replace it with a three-storey mixed commercial/private residential development was rejected in 2019.

Preceding station	Disused railways	Following station
Brockley Lane	London, Chatham and Dover Railway; Greenwich Park branch line	Blackheath Hill
