= Greenwich Park railway station =

Disused railway station in England

Greenwich Park
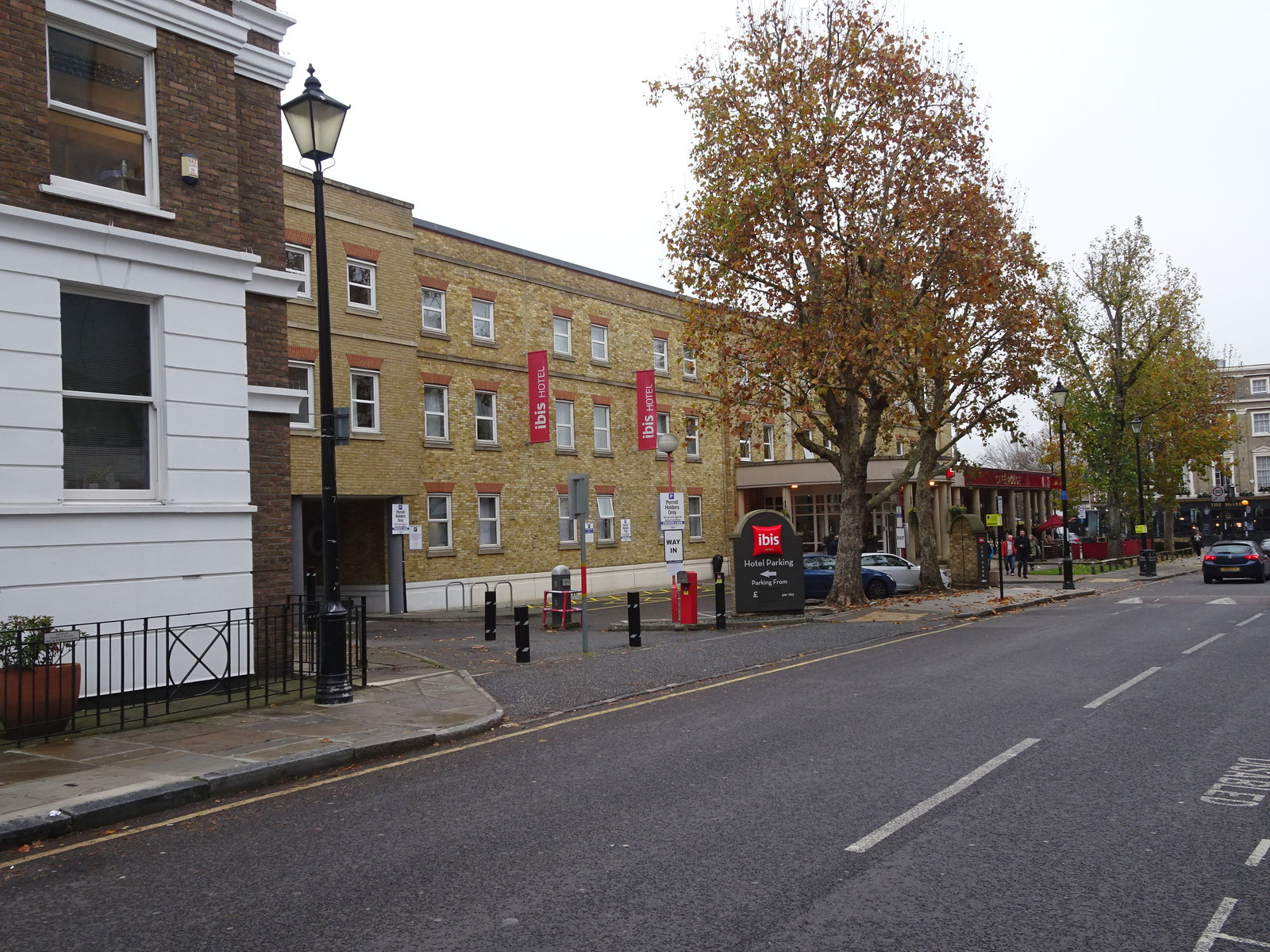
- The site of the station in 2018
- Interactive map of Greenwich Park

General information
- Location: Greenwich
- Local authority: Metropolitan Borough of Greenwich
- Owner: London, Chatham and Dover Railway
- Number of platforms: 3

Key dates
- 1 October 1888: Opened
- 1 January 1917: Closed

Other information
- Coordinates: 51.4798°N 0.0092°W

Greenwich Park was a railway station opened in 1888 by the London, Chatham and Dover Railway (LCDR) in Greenwich, south-east London. The station was originally called Greenwich and the LCDR intended it to rival a nearby station also named Greenwich which was owned by the South Eastern Railway (SER) and which had opened over 50 years earlier. The LCDR's station was the terminus of a branch line from Nunhead.

Despite being in a prime location (on Stockwell Street) the LCDR station failed to attract sufficient passengers, possibly because the rival SER station offered a shorter journey time into central London. In 1899 the LCDR was amalgamated with the SER (as the South Eastern & Chatham Railway), and in 1900 the LCDR station was renamed Greenwich Park to distinguish it from the SER's original Greenwich station.

Owing to wartime economy measures, Greenwich Park was closed in 1917. The section of the branch between Nunhead and Lewisham Road was reopened in 1929 by the Southern Railway with a new connecting spur to Lewisham, providing another route into central London. The section between Lewisham Road and Greenwich Park was officially abandoned in 1929.

After 1929 the station was demolished and the cutting occupied by the trackbed and platforms was infilled. Today the site is occupied by a hotel and its car park. Nothing remains of the railway north-east of the closed Lewisham Road station except for a short section of embankment adjacent to St Johns.

== Opening ==
The LCDR's branch line from Nunhead terminated initially at Blackheath Hill (opened 1871) but in 1881 the company deposited a bill to extend it to Greenwich. The LCDR chairman explained to shareholders: "We should not have spent £450,000 to get to the bottom of Blackheath Hill. The raison d'etre was to get to the heart of Greenwich. Everybody knows what the Greenwich traffic is; it is an astounding traffic." The station opened on 1 October 1888 and was aligned to join the South Eastern Railway (SER) at a junction east of the existing SER Greenwich station.

== Description ==
Greenwich station had three curved platforms and an engine release road. The platforms had awnings covering more or less their whole length. There were an engine siding and inspection pit behind the signal box, which was at the station throat. The station was below street-level in a cutting, as was most of the line from Blackheath Hill. The station building was a generous brick structure with a booking hall, refreshment room and first and second class ladies' rooms leading off it. Stairs led down to the concourse at the head of the platforms.

The stationmaster's house was situated in Burney Street.

== Services ==
In January 1899 there were 43 arrivals and 55 departures on a weekday, 21 on a Sunday. Most terminated at Nunhead but some ran into St. Paul's (now called Blackfriars) or Victoria in central London. By 1913, the station now named Greenwich Park, there were 55 arrivals and 43 departures, 11 on a Sunday. The journey time from Nunhead was nine minutes. Through-trains to St. Paul's took around 30 minutes.

It is likely that most trains were formed of four-wheel carriages headed by a D class 0-4-2T engine. In 1913 a P class 0-6-0T with a bogie coach at each end appeared on the branch, and this ran the last passenger train, on 31 December 1916. Photographs show P class No. 325, D class No. 89 Hecate and coaching set 271 worked the line at some point.

== After closure ==
Greenwich Park station was closed on 1 January 1917. In 1926 the London & Home Counties Traffic Advisory Committee accepted Southern Railway's view that the branch line should be closed permanently. The site was cleared possibly just before the branch was severed in 1929 at Lewisham Road and diverted to Lewisham: a 1928 picture of Blackheath Hill shows rails in situ, heavily overgrown.

The station building survived until the 1960s having been used as a billiard hall and builder's offices. Portions of bridge wall remain in Burney Street and Peyton Place. A short section of embankment survives between Brookmill Road and the South Eastern main line through St Johns station.

Preceding station	Disused railways	Following station
Blackheath Hill	London, Chatham and Dover Railway; Greenwich Park branch line	Terminus
