= Brockley Lane railway station =

Disused railway station in England

Brockley Lane
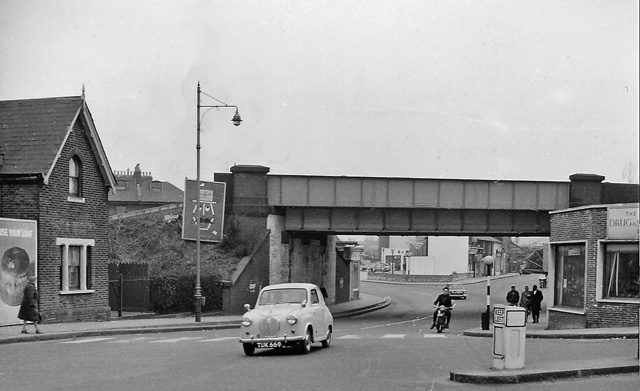
- Site of Brockley Lane station, 1962
- Interactive map of Brockley Lane

General information
- Location: Brockley
- Local authority: Metropolitan Borough of Lewisham
- Number of platforms: 2

Railway companies
- Original company: London, Chatham and Dover Railway

Key dates
- June 1872: Opened
- 1 January 1917: Closed to passengers
- 4 May 1970: Closed to goods

Other information
- Coordinates: 51.46472°N 0.03638°W

Brockley Lane is a closed railway station in Brockley, south London. It was opened in June 1872 by the London, Chatham and Dover Railway, on its Greenwich Park Branch Line. The station closed to passengers in January 1917, but remained open as a goods station until May 1970 (the Great Northern Railway had constructed a coal depot there in 1883).

The station was on Brockley Road, about 140 yards (130 m) north-east of a station, now on the London Overground, named Brockley, at a lower level on the London Bridge to Norwood Junction line, crossing under the former Greenwich Park branch. The line through Brockley Lane station was reopened to freight in 1929 and, in 1935, to passenger trains from Dartford to London Victoria, via a new link into Lewisham, but there was no official suggestion that Brockley Lane might be rebuilt.

The entrance to the station was in use as a shop until it was destroyed by fire in 2004. Short sections of the platforms are still visible at the lineside, as are traces of the entrances on both sides of the bridge. The former stationmaster's residence was opposite, and is now a private dwelling.

== Re-opening and future ==
The 'transport supporting paper' for the London Infrastructure Plan 2050 estimates the cost for the Brockley interchange at £25 million in 2014. It is not clear how detailed the assessment of costs was given Brockley is one of multiple proposals simply noted as £25 million each.

According to the Department for Transport and the Transport for London rail prospectus report, released in 2016, it has been listed as one of the Southeastern franchise planned improvements in the document entitled "New interchange at Brockley", which suggests that there might be a case for reopening the station.

A proposal to create a new Brockley Interchange station, linking the existing Overground station with restored platforms at the former Brockley Lane site, is included in the London Borough of Lewisham's 2019–2041 transport strategy, though with no funding identified for the project. The document states that TFL is to provide an estimated cost.

In January 2024 in response to a freedom of information request, Lewisham council said that it had not since 2020 initiated consultations or lobbied TFL to reopen the Brockley Lane Train station.

In January 2025, in response to a Freedom of Information request, TfL confirmed that it could find no record of Lewisham Council having requested an estimate of the costs of reopening Brockley Interchange.

At Lewisham Council on Wednesday 24 September 2025, in response to a public question Councillor Louise Kupski stated:

"This area is owned by Network Rail, not TfL. The Council has previously requested updates from Network Rail and other infrastructure providers to inform our Infrastructure Delivery Plan (IDP), including estimated costs and timelines. Brockley Station Interchange is included in the Lewisham infrastructure delivery plan (IDP); however, no costings or delivery timeline have been provided to date. The Council continues to press Network Rail for an update."

The Council's September 2025 statement appears to be at odds with the London Borough of Lewisham's 2019–2041 transport strategy that states that TFL is to provide an estimated cost.

In 2025, The Guardian reported that Lewisham Council had spent just 10% of £2 million raised via London’s carbon offset fund, which developers are required to pay into to mitigate emissions from new projects. The money gathered from this fund must be spent on carbon reduction measures in local areas. This could include measures to support public transport such as the Brockley Interchange.

Preceding station	Disused railways	Following station
Nunhead; Line and station open	London, Chatham & Dover Railway; Greenwich Park branch line	Lewisham Road; Line open, station closed
