= 1898 St Johns rail accident =

Railway accident in the UK

Coordinates: 51.4691°N 0.0225°W

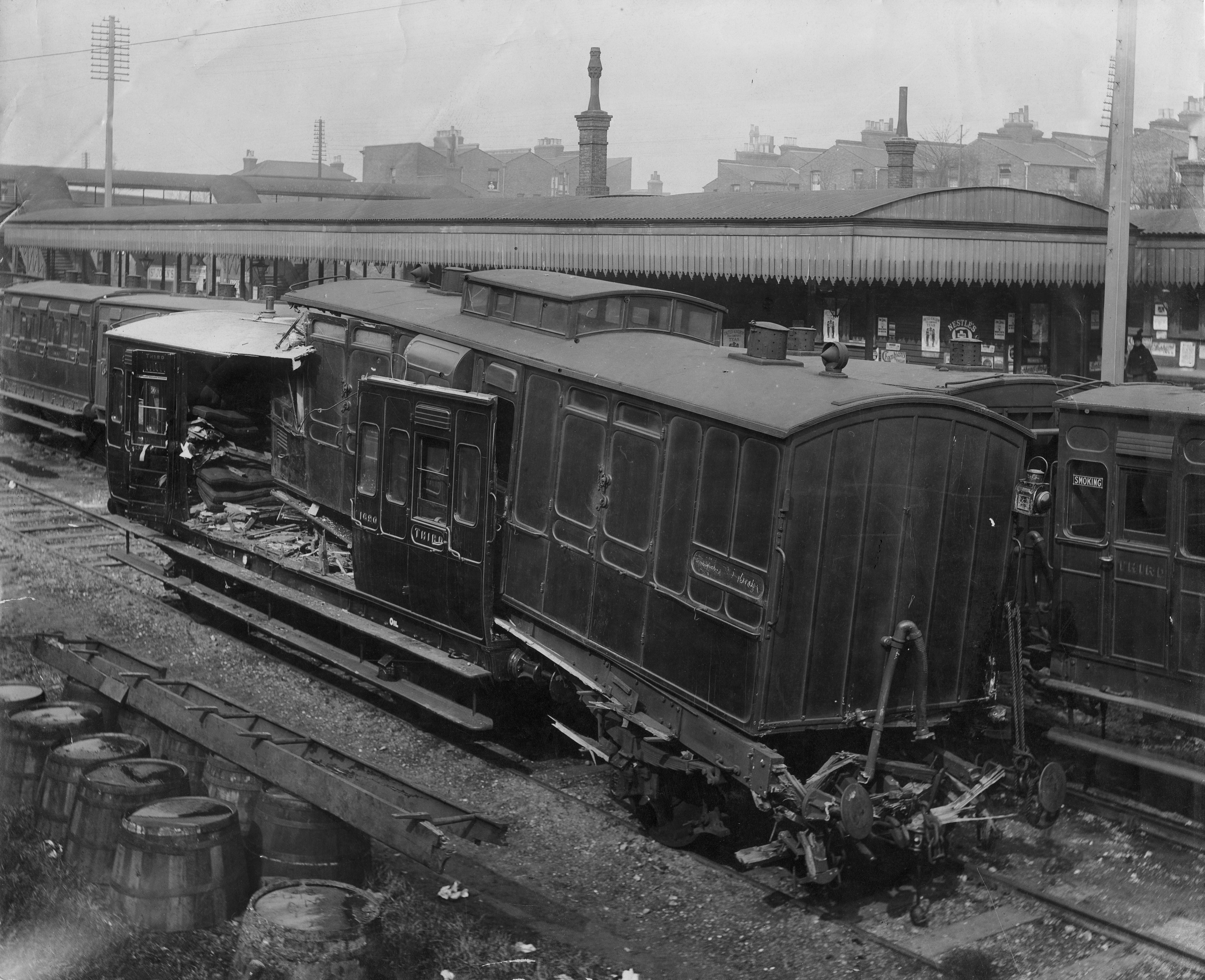
The damaged carriages in the siding next to St Johns Station

The St Johns train crash happened at 9 am on 21 March 1898 when, in thick fog, a passenger train waiting to enter St Johns Station on the South Eastern Railway, UK was run into by another passenger train. Three people were killed and about 20 injured in the accident, which was caused by a signalman's error.

== Background ==
St Johns railway station is on the South Eastern Railway main line as it approaches London, with the tracks running roughly east–west (London). At St Johns the main line was four tracks and the station had three platforms with St Johns signal cabin at the west end of the station. The adjacent signal cabins were Parks Bridge Junction, 1,140 yards (1,040 metres) to the east, and New Cross No. 2, 930 yards (850 metres) to the west.

The line was equipped with Sykes "lock and block" interlocking, which prevented signalmen allowing a second train onto a section before the previous train had left. The interlocking was normally released by trains passing over track treadles as they entered the next section. To allow for mechanical breakdowns, the signalman had a special key to override the interlocking and as some of the treadles in the St Johns area were not completely reliable it had become necessary to occasionally use this facility.

At the time of the accident, the signalman at St Johns was William Honey. He was assisted by a signal lad, Stephen Clews, whose job it was to record both the actions of the signalman and the passing trains in the register book.

== Accident ==
The morning of Monday 21 March 1898 was very foggy. Parks Bridge had passed to St Johns the 07:45 train from Tonbridge to London and it was being held at the up home signal just outside St Johns. This train consisted of an engine and tender and ten vehicles.

The signal cabin was generally very busy and especially so dealing with the morning trains and the fog. Honey lost track of passing trains and formed the belief that he had released the train from Tonbridge and it had passed the cabin and was therefore out of the section. When Parks Bridge offered him the next London-bound train, the 07:00 from Hastings, consisting of an engine and tender and six carriages, Honey went to accept it and, seeing the interlocking was still locked, assumed the treadles had malfunctioned and therefore used his special key to override the interlocking, allowing the Hastings train into the section.

The Tonbridge train had not passed and was still at the up home signal. The Hastings train ran into the back of the Tonbridge train. The Hastings driver thought the impact speed was about 8 mph (13 km/h). The Tonbridge train was pushed forward approximately 30 yards (25 metres) and the rear two vehicles, a third-class carriage and a brake van, were telescoped. Three people were killed and about 20 injured, with a much larger number complaining of being shaken.

== Enquiry ==
A Board of Trade enquiry was convened to investigate the crash. The Enquiry heard detailed evidence from all of the railway staff involved, including the guard, Walter Stevens, who was traveling in the brake van at the rear of the Tonbridge train:

"... I was looking out of my window … when I thought I heard a train approaching … when it was about a coach and a half from my van I saw the engine. I had my hand on the handle of the door and I sprang out at once, the collision happening as I did so.”

It became clear at the enquiry that Honey was challenged twice about the locations of the trains. Clews saw Honey accepting the Hastings train and, as he had not seen the Tonbridge train pass, asked Honey if it had passed. Honey said it had. The Station Master at St Johns had been awaiting the arrival of the Tonbridge train and although he could not see because of the fog, he could hear the safety valves of a steam engine blowing off. He went to the signal cabin and asked Honey whether he knew there was a train waiting. It was clear from Honey's answer that Honey believed that waiting train was the Hastings train, not the Tonbridge train.

The station master said that he had then walked down the platform to the stopped train to get it to pull into the platform, but as he reached the engine, he met Stevens, who told him that there had been a serious accident.

The enquiry concluded that:

"There is no dispute whatsoever as to the circumstances under which this sad accident occurred, signalman Honey candidly admitting his grave blunder in accepting the Hastings train in the belief that the proceeding train (from Tonbridge) had passed St John's, while, as a matter of fact, it was standing outside the station ... In conclusion I am obliged to say there is but little, if any, excuse for signalman Honey’s most serious blunder … and I can further testify to Honey’s readiness to give the fullest explanation in his power of all the facts of the case …"

== Similar accidents ==
Similar accidents occurred at Battersea Park in 1937, South Croydon in 1947, Barnes in 1955 and Crayford in 1959.
