= 2018 Lewisham train strandings =

Railway incident in London, England

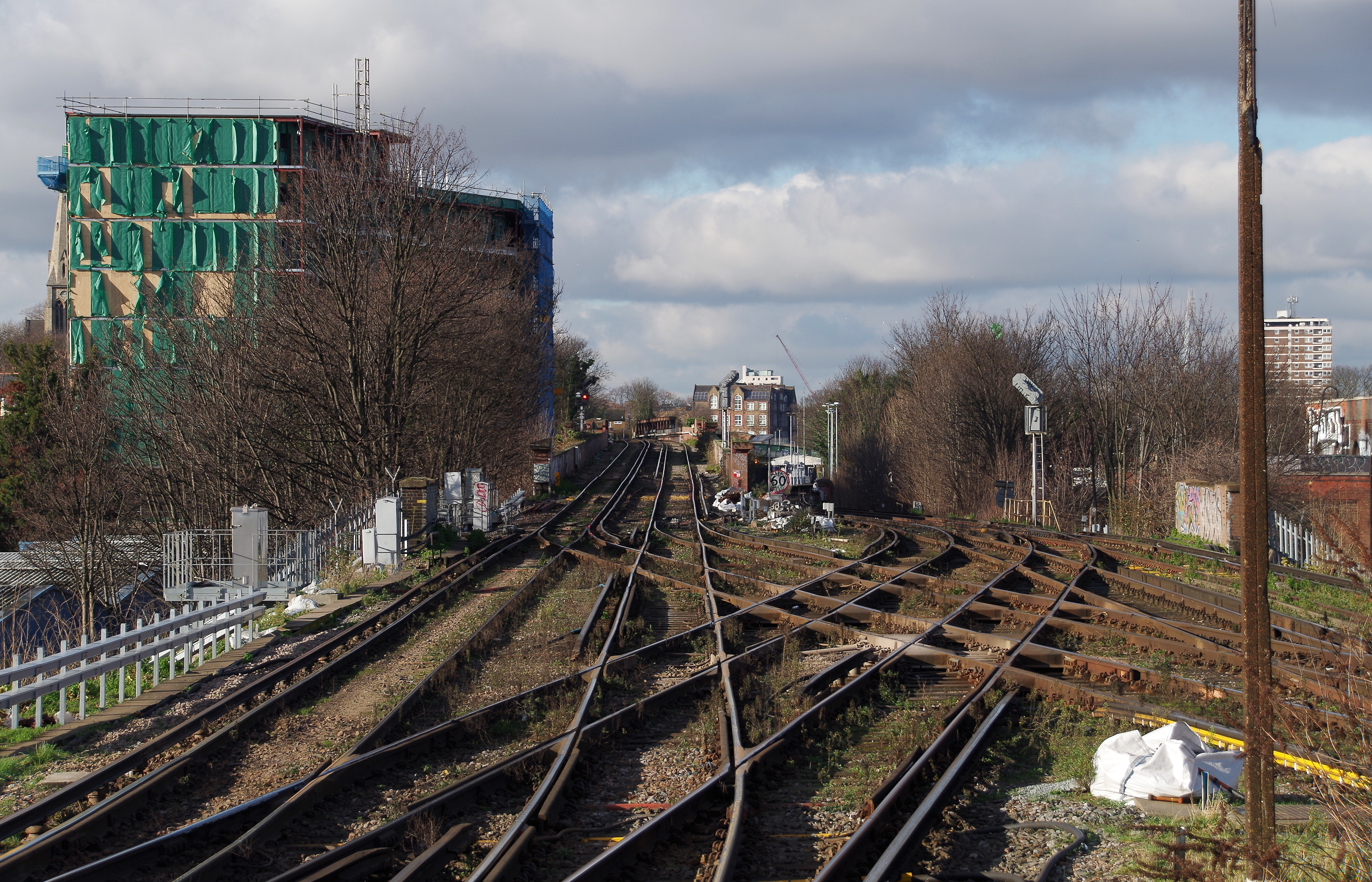
- The approach to Lewisham station from London

Details
- Date: 2 March 2018; 17:34 to 21:59
- Location: Lewisham, St Johns and New Cross, London
- Country: England
- Line: South Eastern Main Line; North Kent Line
- Operator: Southeastern
- Incident type: Unplanned evacuation of passengers from trains
- Cause: Weather, train equipment issues, incident management issues

Statistics
- Trains: 11
- Passengers: ~9,000
- Crew: 11–22
- Deaths: None
- Injured: 4
- Part of the 2018 Great Britain and Ireland cold wave

The Lewisham train strandings occurred on 2 March 2018 in the area of Lewisham, St Johns and New Cross stations during snowy and cold weather. Eleven trains were involved. Passengers abandoned five of the trains due to issues including a lack of communication, heating and toilets. No injuries were reported. Network Rail and the Rail Accident Investigation Branch conducted investigations into the incident.

== Previous strandings ==
=== Huntingdon ===
In June 2005, a passenger train became stranded near Huntingdon for two hours. Conditions quickly became uncomfortable for the passengers on board. The Rail Safety and Standards Board subsequently conducted research into conditions on a stranded train with inoperable air conditioning. It concluded that conditions would become uncomfortable after 40–50 minutes, and intolerable after 70–90 minutes. Opening doors on the train would mean that conditions would be tolerable for up to five hours.

=== Aviemore ===
On 31 March 2010, a passenger train became stranded in snow between Carrbridge and Slochd, Highland. More than 100 passengers had to be rescued.

=== Foxton ===
In October 2010, a passenger train operated by First Capital Connect (FCC) became stranded at Foxton. The incident occurred at 16:44 hours. Conditions on board rapidly deteriorated, with temperatures reaching 37 °C (99 °F). Some passengers abandoned the train after 60 minutes, others broke windows after 2 hours. Passengers were rescued by using another service train drawing up alongside the broken down train, but it could only take 100 of the 375 passengers. A second train rescued the remaining passengers at 20:20.

=== Orpington ===
In November 2010, a Southeastern passenger train became stranded near Orpington. Passengers remained on the train overnight.

=== Kentish Town ===
On 26 May 2011, a passenger train formed of two Class 377 electric multiple units operated by FCC experienced pantograph damage and broke down between Dock Junction and Kentish Town whilst operating a service from Brighton to Bedford. The train was carrying 472 passengers. It took three hours for the failed train to be rescued. Absence of power meant that throughout this time, air conditioning and toilets on the train were inoperative. After 45 minutes the public address system failed, which prevented the driver from keeping the passengers informed of the situation. They then resorted to breaking windows and forcing doors open in an effort to alleviate their discomfort. The lack of communication caused some passengers to abandon the train and start walking along the track towards nearby Kentish Town station. When the train was eventually moved, and having been authorised to do so, the driver overrode a number of safety systems, leading to the train being moved with at least two doors open whilst passengers were on board. FCC policy at the time was that an evacuation of a train should be considered after 60 minutes and must have commenced within 90 minutes of a stranding. A Rail Accident Investigation Branch (RAIB) investigation found that FCC had failed to implement lessons learned from earlier train strandings. FCC were prosecuted by the Office of Rail and Road for offences under Section 3 (1) of the Health and Safety at Work etc. Act 1974 and fined £75,000.

=== South Croydon ===
On 4 June 2011, a passenger train was brought to a halt near South Croydon by the emergency braking system following activation of the passenger communication device. Some passengers abandoned the train after 30 minutes. One of them suffered severe burns when she came into contact with the third rail.

=== Peckham Rye ===
On 7 November 2017, a Class 378 electric multiple unit became stranded 30 m (98 ft) short of Peckham Rye station due to a fault causing the brakes to lock on. About 80 of the 450 passengers were evacuated with the third rail still live. No injuries occurred.

=== Dorset – Hampshire border ===
On 1 March 2018, three passenger trains operated by South Western Railway (SWR) became stranded at Beaulieu Road, Hinton Admiral and New Milton in Dorset and Hampshire in snowy weather. Weather conditions hampered evacuation of the trains, which was not accomplished until the following morning. Passengers spent up to 14 hours on the stranded trains. Complaints were made of a lack of communication from SWR, a lack of heating and toilet facilities. A train operated by CrossCountry was also stranded in the area. Passengers praised the way CrossCountry staff dealt with the situation.

=== Haltwhistle ===
On 1 March 2018, a passenger train became stranded in snow near Haltwhistle, Northumberland. Passengers had to be rescued.

== The incident ==
On 2 March 2018, eleven passenger trains operated by Southeastern became stranded in the Lewisham, St Johns and New Cross area in weather conditions of snow and freezing rain. Due to a lack of communication with passengers, a lack of heating and lack of toilets, passengers abandoned five of the nine trains. The eleven trains involved comprised at least 22 electric multiple units. Two of the units had no toilets, and five of the remaining twenty-plus were operating with toilets that were not in service. Four people were treated for minor injuries.

=== Timeline ===
17:34

Train 2M48 came to a stand after passing Lewisham station, unable to draw power as the third rail was affected by freezing rain. The train comprised two Class 465 and one Class 466 electric multiple units and was operating the 15:56 Charing Cross to Dartford service which had departed 67 minutes late and was running 80 minutes late when it came to a stand. The units involved were 465 003, 465 164 and 466 024.

17:38

Train 2M50 came to a stand approaching Lewisham due to 2M48 being at a stand ahead. The train comprised two Class 376 electric multiple units, which did not have onboard toilets. It was operating the 16:26 Charing Cross to Dartford service which had departed 47 minutes late and was running 54 minutes late when it came to a stand. The units involved were 376 002 and 376 035.

Train 2S54 came to a stand opposite St Johns station. It comprised three Class 465 units and was operating the 17:06 Charing Cross to Orpington service which had departed 17 minutes late and was running 17 minutes late when it came to a stand. The train came to a stand with its rear carriages blocking Tanners Hill Junction.

17:41

Train 2R46 came to a stand between New Cross and St Johns. Train 2V07 came to a stand at St. Johns.

17:44

Train 2H50 came to a stand near New Cross. The train comprised two Class 465 and one Class 466 units and was operating the 17:30 Charing Cross to Tunbridge Wells service which had departed on time and was running 1 minute early when it came to a stand.

17:45

Train 2H00 came to a stand approaching Tanners Hill Junction, which was blocked by train 2S54.

17:50

Train 2S56 came to a stand west of New Cross. The train comprised two Class 465 units and was operating the 17:36 Charing Cross to Slade Green service which had departed one minute late and was running to time when it came to a stand.

17:55

Train 2R48 came to a stand behind train 2S56.

18:10

Train 2H02 came to a stand approaching the flyover at St Johns.

18:16

Network Rail called out a Mobile Operations Manager (MOM) to de-ice the third rail and get 2M48 moving again. It was planned to terminate the train at Blackheath. Until 2M48 had been moved, other trains were unable to proceed, including 2M50, which was being held at a signal in sight of Lewisham station.

18:28

An Automatic Warning System fault developed on 2M48.

18:36

The MOM arrived on site. An emergency power isolation was made to the up and down North Kent Lines to enable the third rail to be de-iced.

18:43

Train 2K43 became stranded at Lewisham station due to the emergency power isolation.

18:45

The MOM reported that passengers had abandoned 2M50 and walking along the track to Lewisham station. An emergency power isolation was made covering all lines between North Kent East Junction and School Junction, Blackheath Junction to Nunhead, Courthill Junction and Tanners Hill. 2M50 had been at a stand for 67 minutes.

18:50

Some passengers abandoned 2S56, which had been at a stand for 72 minutes.

19:06

Some passengers abandoned 2M48, which had been at a stand for 92 minutes.

19:15

More passengers abandoned 2S56. Not reported until 19:40 as the driver was dealing with a passenger who had been taken ill.

19:32

Some passengers abandoned 2H50, which had been at a stand for 109 minutes.

20:26

More passengers abandoned 2M48, which had been at a stand for 168 minutes.

21:36

Current restored to area.

21:54

Train 2M48 was able to proceed.

21:57

Train 2M50 was able to proceed.

21:58

Train 2S54 was able to proceed.

21:59

Trains 2H00 and 2V07 were able to proceed.

22:00

Train 2H02 was able to proceed.

22:05

Trains 2K43 and 2R48 were able to proceed.

22:16

Train 2H50 was able to proceed.

22:23

Train 2S56 was able to proceed.

== Criticism ==
There was widespread criticism of the incident and the way it was handled. Southeastern also issued its own criticism of passengers who abandoned trains, describing them as "trespassers". Rail Magazine criticised Southeastern for swearing in a tweet responding to a query from a passenger on one of the stranded trains.

Passengers on board 2M50, which had no toilets and had been held within sight of Lewisham station, complained of the conditions on board. People were wetting and soiling themselves as there was no other option. They also complained that the train was being held in sight of the station and wondered why it could not be cleared into the platform. An investigation by Rail Magazine revealed that the driver had asked for such permission, but that the power had been switched off before this could be authorised and arranged. Other passengers complained of a lack of heating and lighting when the power had been cut off. One passenger wrote a detailed account of being stranded on 2M50, describing how conditions deteriorated on board the packed train, and criticising Southeastern for not following Rail Delivery Group guidance in respect of stranded trains, which states that evacuation of a stranded train should be commenced after an hour and completed within two hours.

== Investigations ==
=== Network Rail and Southeastern ===
Network Rail and Southeastern commissioned consultants Arthur D Little and Southwood Rail Consulting to conduct an investigation into the incident. The report, released on 23 August, was highly critical of Southeastern and Network Rail finding that the rail industry's inadequate procedures were not fully followed, and that communication between the various parties involved did not adequately support effective management of the incident. Seventeen recommendations were made.

=== Rail Accident Investigation Branch ===
The Rail Accident Investigation Branch (RAIB) opened an investigation into the incident. It published its final report on 25 March 2019. Five recommendations were made and two learning points were identified.

The report found that neither train 2M48 been declared as failed, nor had train 2M50 had been declared as stranded. Train 2M48 had difficulty in starting from Lewisham because no de-icing fluid had been applied to the conductor rail since 22:34 on 1 March. De-icing fluid had an effective time of twelve hours. Due to the emergency timetable that had been implemented and late running trains, no train had passed over that section of line for about 90 minutes. No supplementary treatment of the conductor rail had been carried out. The signalling manager at London Bridge Control Centre was not sure that he had the authority to allow train 2M50 to pass signal L445 at danger under permissive working to allow it into the platform at Lewisham when he did have such authority. The decision to allow train 2M50 past signal L253 prevented it from being re-routed once train 2M48 experienced difficulty in starting from Lewisham. The management of the incident by Southeastern was not effective. Passenger communications via Twitter showed that the situation was rapidly deteriorating. There was no strategy to avoid trains being stranded between stations, whereas on the London Underground network, the policy is to hold trains at stations when there is disruption.

== Response ==
Network Rail and Southeastern issued a joint statement following the release of the RAIB's final report. Amongst measures introduced following the incident were better training for staff, the installation of heated conductor rails in some locations, introduction of more efficient de-icer for the conductor rails, improved radios for staff and the introduction of ice breaking shoes on some electric multiple units.
