= 1857 Lewisham rail crash =

Rear-end collision in London

Lewisham rail crash (1857)

Details
- Date: 28 June 1857; 22:55
- Location: near Lewisham railway station
- Coordinates: 51.465°N 0.0096°W
- Country: England
- Line: North Kent Line
- Operator: South Eastern Railway
- Cause: Signal passed at danger

Statistics
- Trains: 2
- Deaths: 11
- Injured: 30

On 28 June 1857, two trains collided just east of Lewisham railway station in London, killing 11 and injuring 30 more. The 14-carriage 9:15 p.m. from Strood, which was running 15 minutes late, pulled up 200 yards short of Lewisham station at a red signal. The guard took a red lamp to the rear of the train to warn the 9:30 train following. When he heard the approaching train he ran towards it blowing his whistle and waving the lamp. It appears that he was not seen by the driver and the standing train was struck at a speed of around 20 mph (30 km/h), destroying the brake van and rear carriage.

A telegraph system was in place which should have prevented the second train from leaving the preceding Blackheath station until the leading train had cleared Lewisham, using a system of signal bells being rung in the signal boxes. The signals sent and received were recorded in registers kept in the signal boxes: the investigation determined that the line-clear signal had not been sent by the Lewisham signal box, despite being recorded in the Blackheath book. The driver and fireman of the second train and the Blackheath signalman were charged with "neglect of duty causing the deaths of 11 persons".

== Sources ==
- The Times 1857 :
  - 30 June page 5 "Frightful Accident on the North Kent Railway"
  - 9 July page 12 "The Fatal Accident on the North Kent Railway"
