= Blackheath Hill railway station =

Disused railway station in Greenwich, London, England

Blackheath Hill
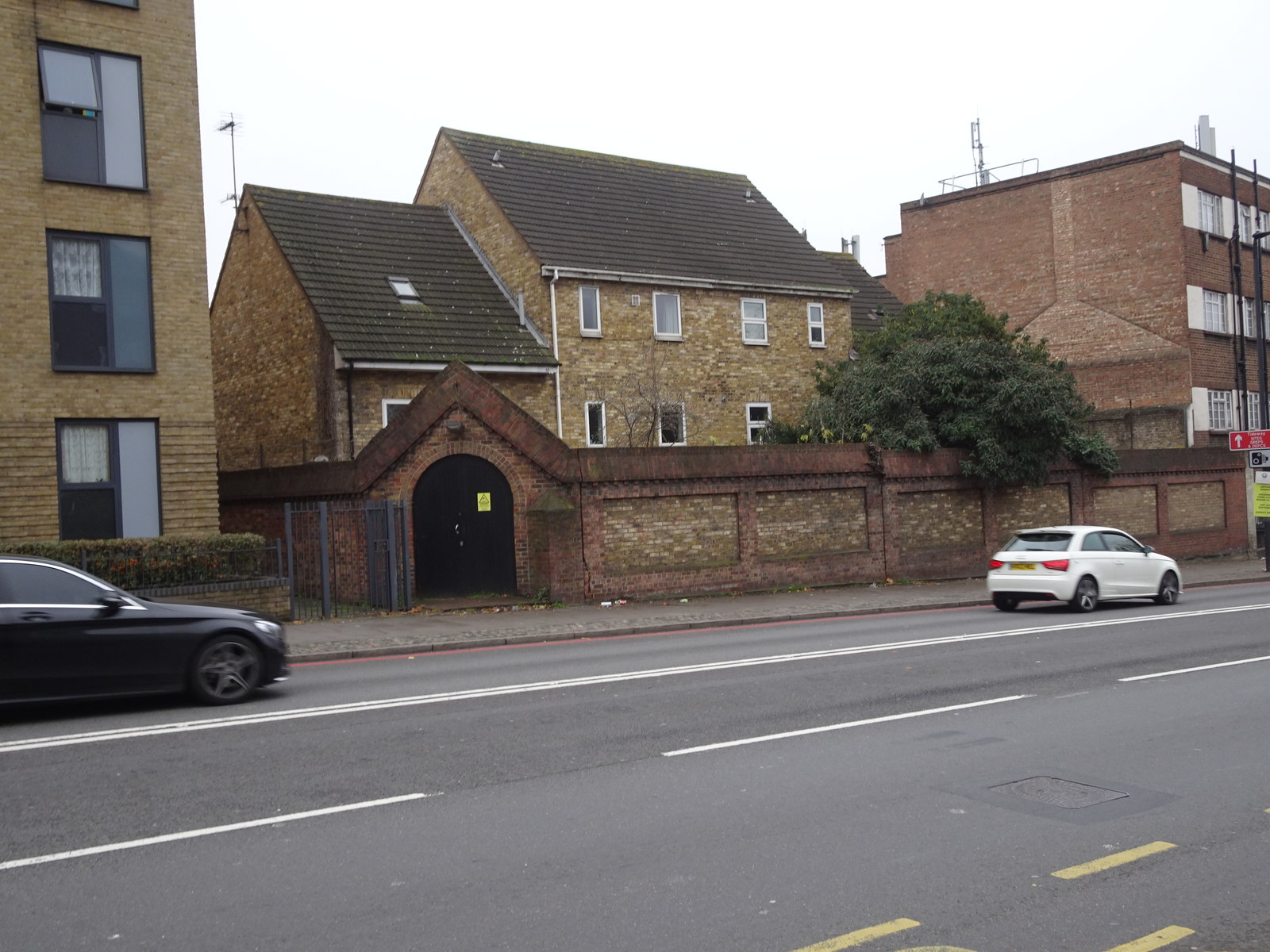
- The site of the station in 2018
- Interactive map of Blackheath Hill

General information
- Location: Greenwich
- Grid reference: TQ380767
- Owner: London, Chatham and Dover Railway
- Number of platforms: 2

Key dates
- 18 September 1871: Opened
- 1 January 1917: Closed

Other information
- Coordinates: 51.47244°N 0.01445°W

Blackheath Hill was a railway station between the Greenwich and Lewisham areas in south-east London. It was opened in 1871 by the London, Chatham and Dover Railway (LCDR) on its Greenwich Park Branch Line. Blackheath Hill was at the end of the line until an extension to Greenwich Park opened in 1888.

The station closed in 1917 along with the rest of the line, owing to low usage and economy measures during World War I. The station building beside the A2 road was demolished in the mid-1980s, and the site has since been entirely built over. Whilst the building work was being undertaken the retaining wall and tunnel under the A2 were visible.

Preceding station	Disused railways	Following station
Lewisham Road	London, Chatham & Dover Railway; Greenwich Park branch line	Greenwich Park
