= London Borough of Lewisham =

Borough of London

Coordinates: 51°25′N 0°02′W

- London borough
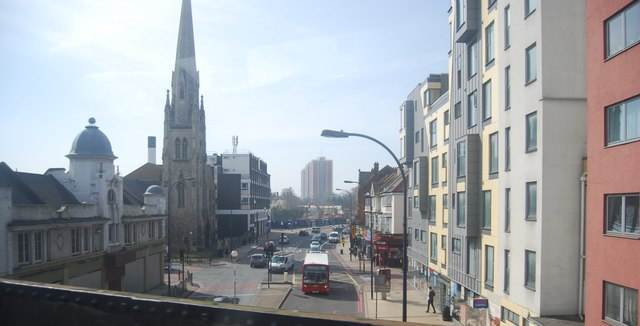
- The A21 passing through Lewisham

- Coat of arms Council logo
- Motto: ‘’Salus populi suprema lex’’ (The health of the people is the supreme law)
- Lewisham shown within Greater London
- Sovereign state: United Kingdom
- Constituent country: England
- Region: London
- Ceremonial county: Greater London
- Created: 1 April 1965
- Admin HQ: Catford

Government
  - Type: London borough council
  - Body: Lewisham London Borough Council
  - London Assembly: Len Duvall AM for Greenwich and Lewisham
  - MPs: Ellie Reeves (Labour); Vicky Foxcroft (Labour); Janet Daby (Labour)

Area
  - Total: 13.57 sq mi (35.15 km^{2})
  - Rank: 271st (of 296)

Population (2025)
  - Total: 301,037
  - Rank: 53rd (of 296)
  - Density: 22,180/sq mi (8,564/km^{2})
- Time zone: UTC (GMT)
  - Summer (DST): UTC+1 (BST)
- Postcodes: SE, BR
- Area code: 020
- ISO 3166 code: GB-LEW
- ONS code: 00AZ
- GSS code: E09000023
- Police: Metropolitan Police
- Website: Council Website

Lewisham (/ˈluːɪʃəm/ LOO-ish-əm) is a London borough in south-east London, England. It forms part of Inner London. The principal settlement of the borough is Lewisham. The local authority is Lewisham London Borough Council, based in Catford. The Prime Meridian passes through Lewisham. Blackheath, Goldsmiths, University of London and Millwall F.C. are located within the borough.

== History ==
The modern borough broadly corresponds to the area of the ancient parishes of Lee and Lewisham, plus the later parish of Deptford St Paul, created in 1730 when the ancient parish of Deptford was subdivided. (The other Deptford parish created in 1730, Deptford St Nicholas, went instead to the borough of Greenwich.) Most of the area was historically in the county of Kent, although Deptford St Paul straddled the boundary with Surrey, with its chapelry of Hatcham (the area now known as New Cross) being in the latter county. From 1856 the area was governed by the Metropolitan Board of Works, which was established to provide services across the metropolis of London.

In 1889 the Metropolitan Board of Works' area was made the County of London. From 1856 until 1900 the lower tier of local government within the metropolis comprised various parish vestries and district boards. In 1900 the lower tier was reorganised into metropolitan boroughs, two of which were Lewisham (covering the parishes of Lewisham and Lee) and Deptford (covering the parish of Deptford St Paul).

The larger London Borough of Lewisham was created in 1965 under the London Government Act 1963, as an amalgamation of the former area of the metropolitan boroughs of Lewisham and Deptford.

Minor boundary changes have occurred since its creation. The most significant amendments were made in 1996, when the former area of the Royal Docks in Deptford was transferred from the London Borough of Greenwich.

== Geography ==
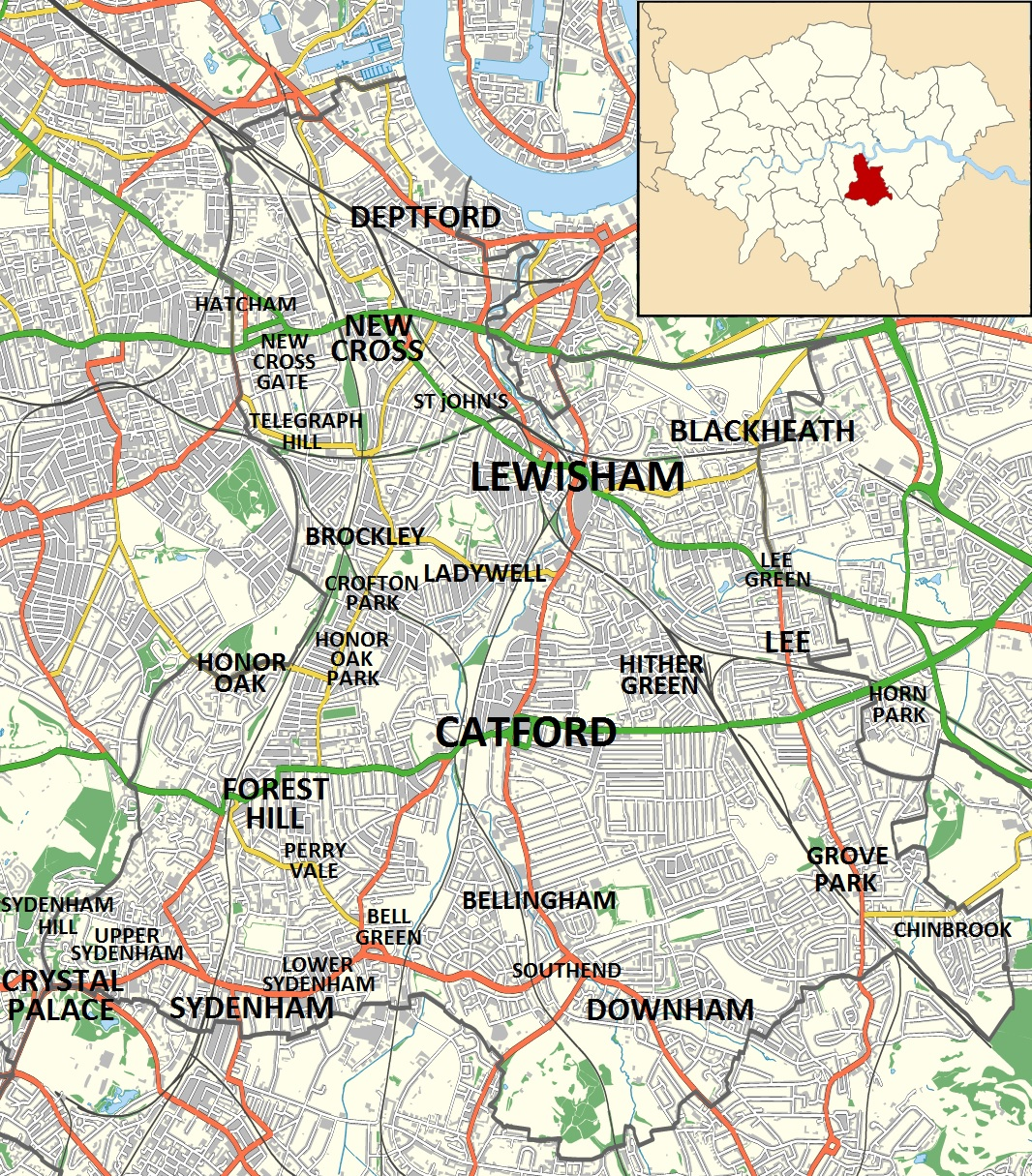
Locations in and around the London Borough of Lewisham

The borough is surrounded by the Royal Borough of Greenwich to the east (where the border runs between Deptford and Horn Park), the London Borough of Bromley to the south (where the border runs between Horn Park and Crystal Palace Park), and the London Borough of Southwark to the west (where the border runs between Crystal Palace Park and Rotherhithe). The River Thames forms a short section of northern boundary with the Isle of Dogs in the London Borough of Tower Hamlets. Deptford Creek, Pool River, River Quaggy and River Ravensbourne pass through the borough. Major landmarks include All Saints Church in Blackheath, the Citibank Tower in Lewisham, Dietrich Bonhoeffer Church (Sydenham's German Church, technically located in Forest Hill) and the Horniman Museum in Forest Hill. Millwall F.C. are based in the borough, their stadium The Den being located in South Bermondsey.

== Governance ==
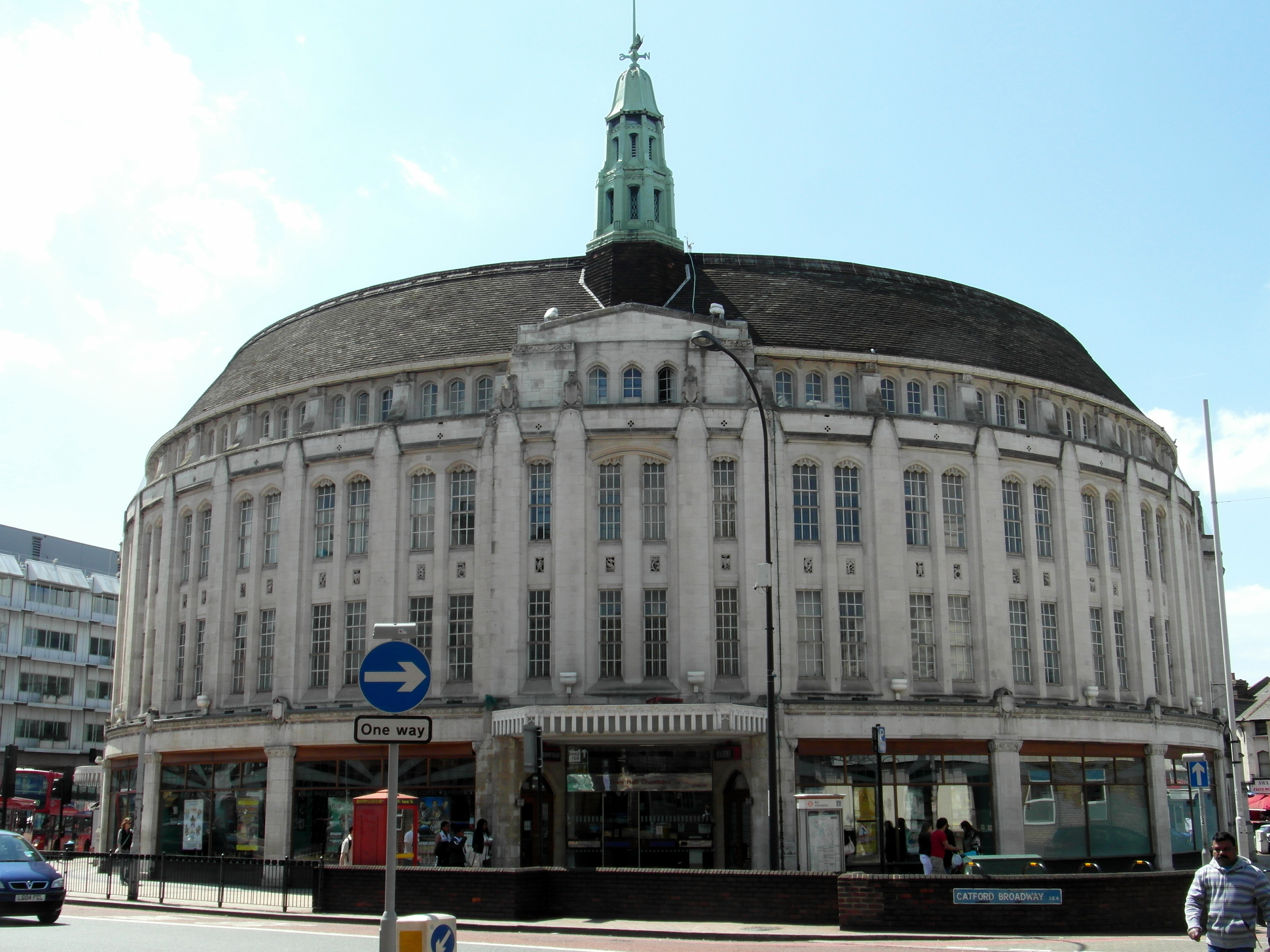
Lewisham Town Hall, completed in 1932

The local authority is Lewisham Council, based at Lewisham Town Hall and the adjoining Laurence House in the Catford area of the borough. Since 2002 the council has been led by the directly elected Mayor of Lewisham. A speaker fulfils the civic and ceremonial roles previously undertaken by the (non-political) mayor prior to 2002. The former mayor, Brenda Dacres, was the first black woman directly elected mayor in England when elected in March 2024.

=== Greater London representation ===
Since 2000, for elections to the London Assembly, the borough forms part of the Greenwich and Lewisham constituency.

=== Westminster Parliament ===
The borough includes the constituencies of Lewisham North, Lewisham West and East Dulwich and Lewisham East.

These are the MPs who have represented constituencies covered by the borough since its formation in 1964. Constituencies change their boundaries over time, even where names remain the same.

MP	Party	Represented	Dates
Heidi Alexander	Labour	Lewisham East	2010–2018
Christopher Chataway	Conservative	Lewisham North	1964–66
Janet Daby	Labour	Lewisham East	2018–present
James Dickens	Labour	Lewisham West	1966–70
Jim Dowd	Labour	Lewisham West	1992–2017
Vicky Foxcroft	Labour	Lewisham, Deptford	2015–present
John Selwyn Gummer	Conservative	Lewisham West	1970–74 (Feb)
Carol Johnson	Labour	Lewisham South	1964–74 (Feb)
Patrick McNair-Wilson	Conservative	Lewisham West	1964–66
John Maples	Conservative	Lewisham West	1983–92
Roland Moyle	Labour	Lewisham North; Lewisham East	1966–74 (Feb); 1974 (Feb)-79
Colin Moynihan	Conservative	Lewisham East	1983–92
Bridget Prentice	Labour	Lewisham East	1992–2010
Christopher Price	Labour	Lewisham West	1974 (Feb)-79
Ellie Reeves	Labour	Lewisham West	2017–present
John Silkin	Labour	Deptford; Lewisham, Deptford	1964–74 (Feb); 1974 (Feb)-87

== Demographics ==
Population pyramid of the Borough of Lewisham

According to the 2011 census, Lewisham has a population of 275,885, is 53% white and 47% BME, and 43% of households are owner-occupiers.

A 2017 report by Trust for London and the New Policy Institute found that Lewisham has a poverty rate of 26%, close to the London-wide figure of 27%.

Population census
Year	Pop.	±%
1801	16,640	—
1811	19,728	+18.6%
1821	24,474	+24.1%
1831	27,329	+11.7%
1841	32,589	+19.2%
1851	41,593	+27.6%
1861	76,958	+85.0%
1871	112,324	+46.0%
1881	147,689	+31.5%
1891	173,229	+17.3%
1901	217,295	+25.4%
1911	272,600	+25.5%
1921	299,022	+9.7%
1931	328,010	+9.7%
1941	314,953	−4.0%
1951	302,420	−4.0%
1961	285,431	−5.6%
1971	269,401	−5.6%
1981	230,504	−14.4%
1991	240,649	+4.4%
2001	248,924	+3.4%
2011	275,885	+10.8%
2021	300,553	+8.9%
2024 estimate	301,255	+0.2%
Note: 2024 estimate

=== Ethnicity ===
Ethnic makeup of Lewisham by single year ages in 2021

Ethnic Group	Year											
Ethnic Group	1971 estimations		1981 estimations		1991 census		2001 census		2011 census		2021 census	
Ethnic Group	Number	%	Number	%	Number	%	Number	%	Number	%	Number	%
White: Total	–	91.9%	193,492	84.9%	180,234	78%	164,098	65.8%	147,686	53.6%	154,749	51.5%
White: British	–	–	–	–	–	–	141,814	56.9%	114,446	41.5%	111,726	37.2%
White: Irish	–	–	–	–	–	–	5,206	1.9%	6,990	2.8%	5,055	1.7%
White: Gypsy or Irish Traveller	–	–	–	–	–	–			208	0.1%	116	0.0%
White: Roma	–	–	–	–	–	–	–	–	–	–	1,033	0.3%
White: Other	–	–	–	–	–	–	15,294	6.1%	27,826	10.1%	36,819	12.3%
Asian or Asian British: Total	–	–	–	–	9,576	4.1%	12,881	5.2%	25,534	9.3%	26,927	9%
Asian or Asian British: Indian	–	–	–	–	2,790		3,487	1.4%	4,600	1.7%	5,046	1.7%
Asian or Asian British: Pakistani	–	–	–	–	739		1,090	0.4%	1,596	0.6%	2,361	0.8%
Asian or Asian British: Bangladeshi	–	–	–	–	636		1,229	0.5%	1,388	0.5%	1,826	0.6%
Asian or Asian British: Chinese	–	–	–	–	2,380		3,431	1.4%	6,164	2.2%	6,296	2.1%
Asian or Asian British: Other Asian	–	–	–	–	3,031		3,644	1.4%	11,786	4.3%	11,398	3.8%
Black or Black British: Total	–	–	–	–	37,524	16.2%	58,260	23.4%	74,942	27.2%	80,473	26.8%
Black or Black British: African	–	–	–	–	8,554		22,571	9.0%	32,025	11.6%	37,834	12.6%
Black or Black British: Caribbean	–	–	–	–	23,229	10%	30,543	12.3%	30,854	11.2%	31,883	10.6%
Black or Black British: Other Black	–	–	–	–	5,741		5,146	2.1%	12,063	4.4%	10,756	3.6%
Mixed or British Mixed: Total	–	–	–	–	–	–	10,399	4.1%	20,472	7.4%	24,253	8.2%
Mixed: White and Black Caribbean	–	–	–	–	–	–	4,760	1.9%	8,539	3.1%	8,726	2.9%
Mixed: White and Black African	–	–	–	–	–	–	1,599	0.6%	3,559	1.3%	3,774	1.3%
Mixed: White and Asian	–	–	–	–	–	–	1,565	0.6%	3,045	1.1%	4,359	1.5%
Mixed: Other Mixed	–	–	–	–	–	–	2,475	1.0%	5,329	1.9%	7,394	2.5%
Other: Total	–	–	–	–	3,649	1.5%	3,284	1.3%	7,341	2.6%	14,151	4.8%
Other: Arab	–	–	–	–	–	–	–	–	1,456	0.5%	1671	0.6%
Other: Any other ethnic group	–	–	–	–	3,649	1.5%	3,284	1.3%	5,795	2.1%	12,480	4.2%
Ethnic minority: Total	–	8.9%	34,463	15.1%	50,749	21.8%	84,824	34.2%	128,289	46.4%	145,804	48.5%
Total	–	100%	227,955	100%	230,983	100%	248,922	100.00%	275,885	100.00%	300,553	100%

=== Religion ===
The following table shows the religious identity of residents residing in Lewisham according to 2021 census results

Religion	2021	
Religion	Number	%
Christian	131,706	43.8
Muslim	22,264	7.4
Jewish	826	0.3
Hindu	6,459	2.1
Sikh	720	0.2
Buddhism	3,270	1.1
Other religion	2,269	0.8
No religion	110,379	36.7
Religion not stated	22,660	7.5
Total	300,553	100.0

=== Age and sex ===
The male population in Lewisham is 157,820, and the female population is 142,733. The average age of people living in Lewisham is 37 years old.

The following table shows the age distributions of residents residing in Lewisham according to 2021 census results.

Age	2021	
Age	Number	%
Below 14	54,877	18.26
Between 15 and 24	34,479	11.47
Between 25 and 34	58,434	19.44
Between 35 and 44	51,254	17.05
Between 45 and 54	40,770	13.56
Between 55 and 64	32,091	10.68
Between 65 and 74	16,092	5.35
Between 75 and 100	12,557	4.18
Total	300,553	100.0

=== Immigration ===
This list includes top-15 sources of immigration to Borough of Lewisham for 2021 census:

#	Country	Number
1	Nigeria	9,278
2	Jamaica	8,679
3	Italy	4,047
4	Romania	3,924
5	Poland	3,841
6	Sri Lanka	3,275
7	Ireland	2,942
8	Spain	2,908
9	Ghana	2,838
10	India	2,554
11	France	2,489
12	China	2,222
13	Brazil	2,190
14	United States	2,078
15	Vietnam	1,884

== Education ==
The London's Poverty Profile, a report by Trust for London and the New Policy Institute, found that 42% of 19-year-olds in Lewisham lack level 3 qualifications. This is the 3rd worst rate out of 32 boroughs.

In 2018, Lewisham had the third highest rate of exclusions of pupils from secondary schools of any area in England.

== Transport ==
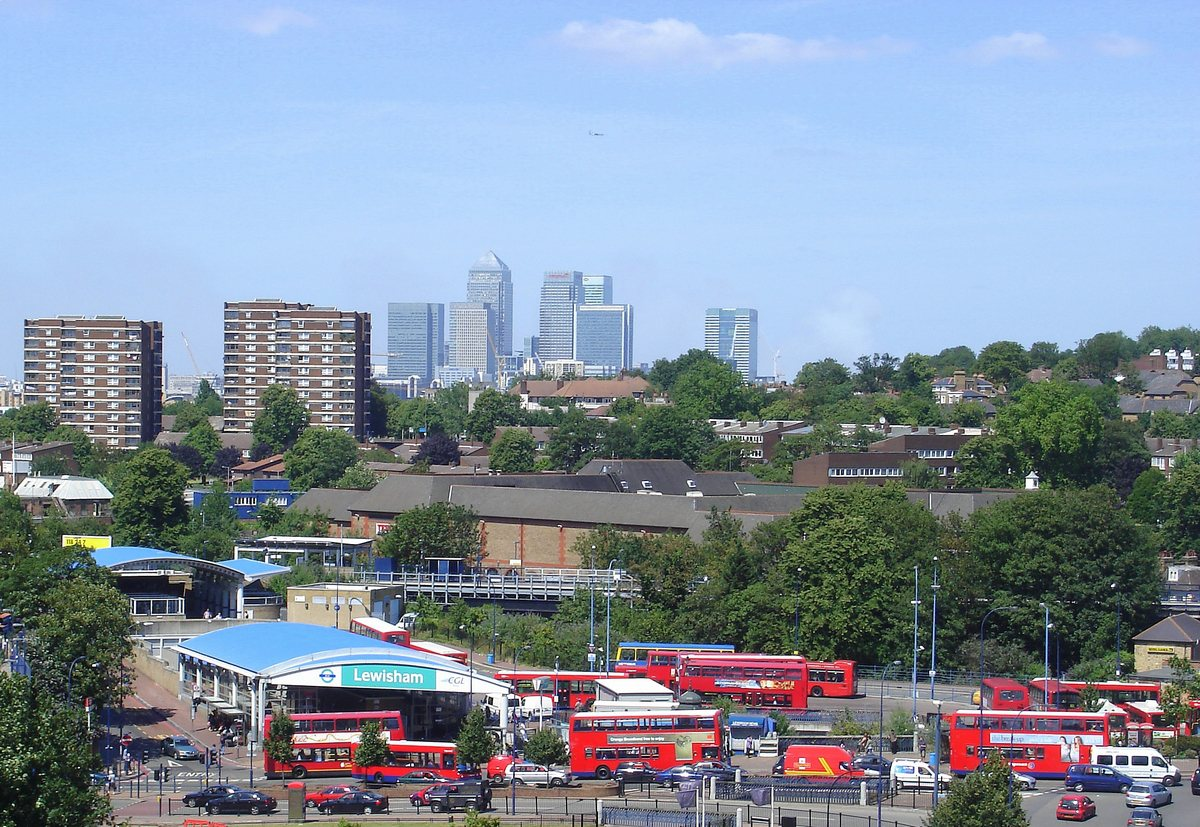
Lewisham Station in 2006, an important transport hub

Lewisham station, once known as Lewisham Junction, is located at the junction of the lines to Dartford and Hayes, and is also the terminus of the southern branch of the Docklands Light Railway.

The East London line (on the London Underground network) terminated at New Cross and New Cross Gate until December 2007. An extension to this line was opened on 23 May 2010, serving Brockley, Honor Oak Park, Forest Hill, and Sydenham. This now forms part of the London Overground network.

The South London Line runs along the extreme north western edge of the borough, and there are currently no stations that are located within the borough. There is a proposal for a new station at New Bermondsey providing a link to Clapham Junction.

=== Railway stations ===
- Beckenham Hill
- Bellingham
- Blackheath – on the boundary between Lewisham & Greenwich
- Brockley
- Catford
- Catford Bridge
- Crofton Park
- Deptford
- Forest Hill
- Grove Park
- Hither Green
- Honor Oak Park
- Ladywell
- Lee
- Lewisham
- Lower Sydenham – on the border between the Boroughs of Lewisham and Bromley
- New Cross
- New Cross Gate
- St Johns
- Sydenham

=== DLR stations ===
- Deptford Bridge – on the border between Lewisham and Greenwich.
- Elverson Road – also on the border between Lewisham and Greenwich.
- Lewisham

=== London Underground ===
There are no Tube stations currently in the borough, as the East London Line has been part of London Overground since 2006. However, an extension of the Bakerloo line beyond Elephant & Castle to Lewisham and Hayes has been proposed.

=== Cycling ===
The following designated Cycleways are available in Lewisham:

- Cycleway 4 (C4) along Deptford's Evelyn Street (A200), which runs from Tower Bridge to Woolwich.
- Cycleway 10 (C10) from Euston to Greenwich, going through Surrey Canal Road and Deptford (Folkestone Gardens).
- Cycleway 14 (C14) from Waterloo to Thamesmead along the river Thames in Deptford.
- Cycleway 66 (C66) from Brockley to Forest Hill.

In addition to these designated routes, the Waterlink Way (to be upgraded to Cycleway 18) runs from north to south along the Ravensbourne and Pool rivers.

=== Main roads ===
- A2 from the border with Old Kent Road in the west to Kidbrooke in the east.
- A20 from New Cross to the border with Eltham in the east.
- A21 from Lewisham to the border with Bromley in the south.
- A202 from New Cross Gate to the border with Peckham in the west.
- A205 (South Circular Road) passes through the centre of the borough from the border with Dulwich in the west to Eltham in the east. Except for a short section in Lee as it approaches Eltham, it is purely a one-lane-each-way road.

=== Travel to work ===
In March 2011, the main forms of transport that residents used to travel to work were: train, 18.6% of all residents aged 16–74; driving a car or van, 11.2%; bus, minibus or coach, 11.2%; underground, metro, light rail, tram, 9.7%; on foot, 4.3%; work mainly at or from home, 2.8%; bicycle, 2.6%.

48% of households in the borough are car free, compared to 42% across Greater London.

== Sport and leisure ==
Millwall Football Club was originally formed in 1885, in Millwall on the Isle of Dogs, East London. They retained the name, even though they moved across the river to New Cross, South London in 1910. In 1993 they moved to their current stadium, The Den which is in Bermondsey, but falls under the Borough of Lewisham. The Borough has a Non-League football club Lewisham Borough Football Club, who play at the Ladywell Arena, Catford.

== Civic affairs ==
=== Motto ===
The motto of the borough is "Salus Populi Suprema Lex", which means (roughly translated) "The welfare of the people [is] the highest law."

=== Twinning ===
The borough is twinned with the following towns:

- Charlottenburg, Berlin, Germany
- Antony, Hauts-de-Seine, France
- Matagalpa, Nicaragua

The borough has also signed a "friendship link" with Ekurhuleni, near Johannesburg, South Africa.

=== Freedom of the Borough ===
The honour of Freedom of the Borough has been awarded to:

- Alan Milner Smith, Town Clerk (9 December 1971)
- Frederick William Winslade, appointed OBE for services to local government in Lewisham and Camberwell New Year Honours 1967 and CBE for services to local government in Lewisham Birthday Honours 1978(28 November 1975)
- Daisy Amelia Elizabeth Hurren (10 October 1985)
- Alfred Anderson Hawkins (30 March 1990)
- Desmond Tutu (4 May 1990)
- Terry Waite (16 November 1992)
- Sybil Theodora Phoenix,(8 March 1996)
- Dame Cicely Saunders, (10 March 2000)
- James Leslie Hicks ('Les') Eytle (8 June 2007)
- Dame Erica Pienaar (2013)
- Baroness (Doreen) Lawrence of Clarendon, (2014)
- Dame Joan Ruddock (2016)
- Bridget Prentice (2016)

== See also ==
- List of people from Lewisham
- List of public art in Lewisham
