= William Robert Sykes =

Railway engineer

William Robert Sykes (1840–1917) was a British engineer from London, known for his work in railway signalling and other safety devices. He is noted for the invention of the Sykes 'Lock and block' interlocking system of points and signals.

== Career ==
Born in London in April 1840, Sykes obtained a job with the Electric and International Telegraph Company in the Strand, at the age of 14. He was interested in clocks, and his knowledge of clockmaking became blended with his knowledge of the electrical telegraph. In 1861 he moved to Shepherds, an electric clock & chronograph maker and in 1863 he joined the London Chatham and Dover Railway (LCDR) under the telegraph superintendent, Mr Ruddall. He became interested in railway safety and by 1865 he had introduced three significant advances in this field. These were: an electrical repeater, showing the position of signals out of sight of the signalman; an automatic recording device showing what block signals had been sent and received, and a short length of track circuiting at Brixton. In 1872 he devised a scheme where trains on the District Railway automatically turned signals to red as they passed them.

=== Lock and block ===
In 1874 Sykes approached James Staats Forbes with a scheme to interlock the signals and points of three successive LCDR signal boxes in outer London. This proved to be a success and resulted in his patented system known as 'lock and block'. From 1875 the Board of Trade began to commend the new system in its Railway Accident Reports and so it was gradually adopted by other British Railways. In 1882 the system was first installed in the USA where it was known as the 'controlled manual blocking system.' The system was also used in Russia and Japan.

Sykes also devised an electro-mechanical method of working points and signals which was tried out at Penge tunnel.

=== 1899–1917 ===
At the formation of the South Eastern and Chatham Railway in 1899, Sykes retired from the railway and formed the W. R. Sykes Interlocking Signal Company. The company became part of the Westinghouse Brake and Signal Company Ltd after Syke's death in 1917.

== Sources ==
- Marshall, John (1978). A biographical dictionary of railway engineers. Newton Abbot, Oxford: David & Charles. ISBN 0-7153-7489-3..
- "The Sykes Family". steamindex.com. William Robert.
- "W R Sykes". polunnio. 1973.
