= Greenwich Park branch line =

Greenwich Park branch line (Lewisham line)
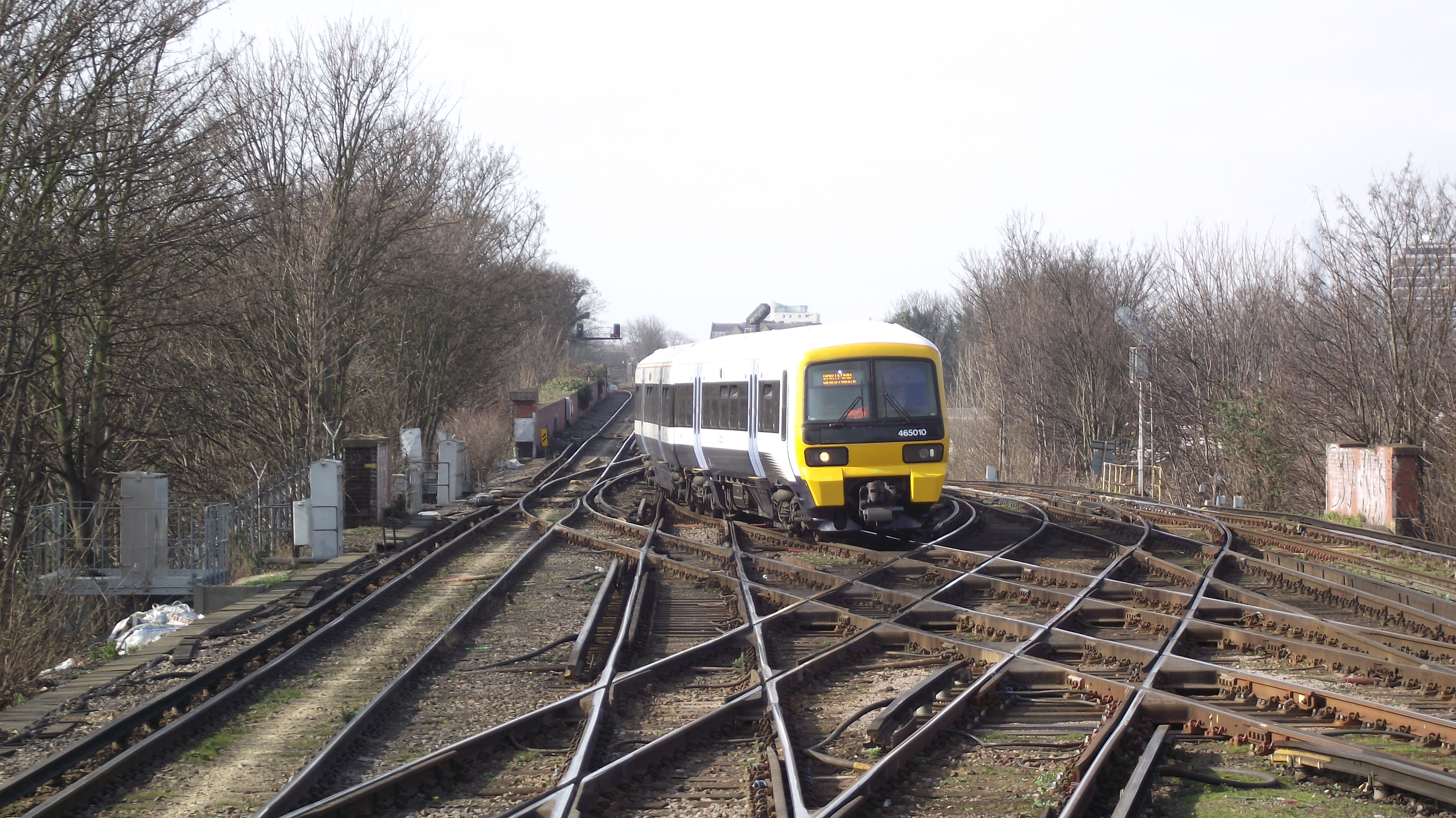
- Southeastern train on the crossover near Lewisham

Overview
- Status: Operational
- Owner: Network Rail
- Locale: Greater London
- Termini: Peckham Rye; Lewisham

Service
- Type: Commuter rail, Freight rail
- System: National Rail
- Operator(s): Southeastern
- Rolling stock: British Rail Class 465; British Rail Class 466

Technical
- Number of tracks: 2
- Track gauge: 4 ft 8 1/2 in (1,435 mm) standard gauge
- Electrification: 750 V DC third rail
Route map
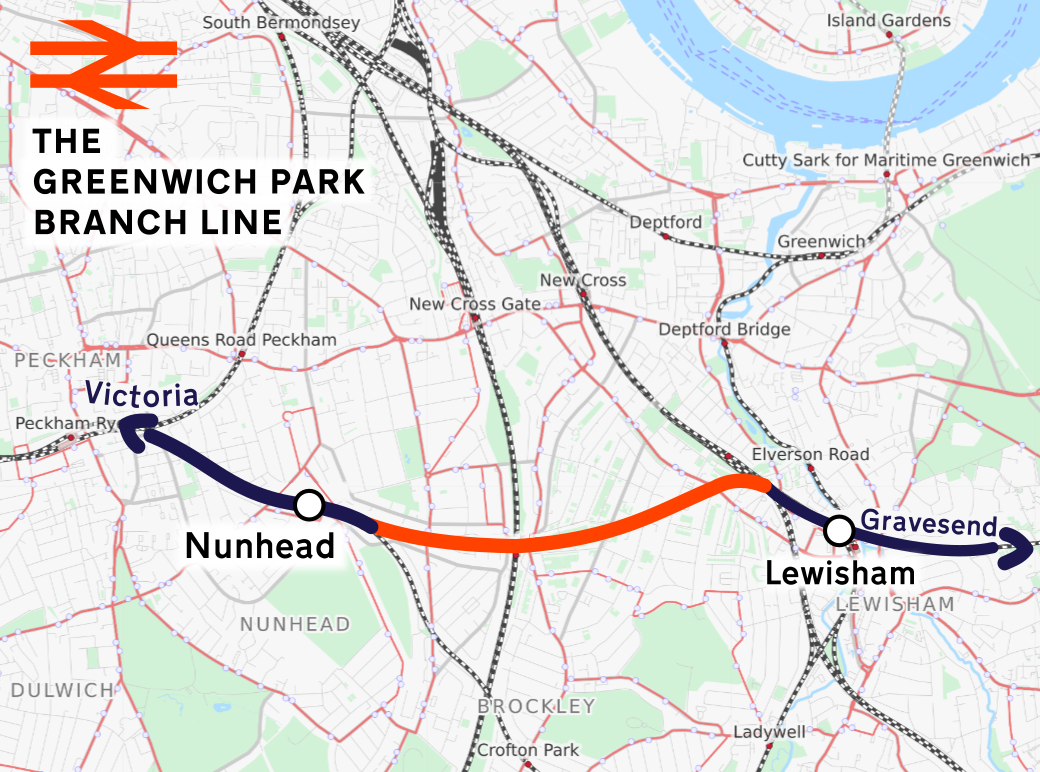
(Click to expand)

The Greenwich Park branch line (also known as the Lewisham line) is a short section of railway line in south east London which links the Catford loop line to the South Eastern Main Line which originally terminated at Greenwich Park station. It provides a link for freight trains travelling from north London to the south east, as well as a route for passenger trains from London Victoria station to destinations in South East London and Kent.

== History ==
The line was originally built as the Greenwich Park branch line by the London, Chatham and Dover Railway from Nunhead to a terminus at Greenwich Park. It ran from a junction at Nunhead in a generally north-east direction to a terminus on the Greenwich High Road, close to the north-west corner of Greenwich Park, approximately 3 miles (4.8 km). A short tunnel took the branch under the A2 at Blackheath Hill. The entrance to Brockley Lane station is still visible at Brockley Cross.

There were four stations:

- Brockley Lane
- Lewisham Road
- Blackheath Hill (opened 1871)
- Greenwich Park (opened 1888)

All closed on 1 January 1917, and the branch beyond Lewisham Road was abandoned on 1 January 1926 by the Southern Railway.

== Creating the link ==
On 7 July 1929, the branch was reopened as far as Lewisham Road station, with a new connection to the South Eastern Railway lines at Lewisham. The Southern Railway had absorbed the London, Chatham and Dover and the South Eastern Railways and sought to link the two networks to enable cross-London freight. From 30 September 1935 the line was electrified, enabling passenger trains from Dartford to access Victoria (see Bexleyheath Line).

It has acted as a diversionary route for trains routed to London Bridge for any engineering works in the New Cross area. Trains divert to other London terminals (stations) using this line.

=== Possible revival of Brockley Lane station ===
A report released by the Department for Transport and Transport for London in 2016 covering future improvements to rail services in London and the South East mentions a new interchange at Brockley as a potential, long-term future improvement for South East London, opening the possibility of Brockley Lane station being reopened, although there is no further information beyond this.

== Current traffic ==
Passenger services are provided by Southeastern. Currently the off-peak service is 2tph between London Victoria and Gravesend via Bexleyheath (terminating at Dartford late at night).

Freightliner Intermodal operates regular container trains to Thamesport on the Isle of Grain.

DB Cargo UK runs engineering trains to Hoo Junction.
