= Nunhead railway station =

National Rail station in London, England

Nunhead
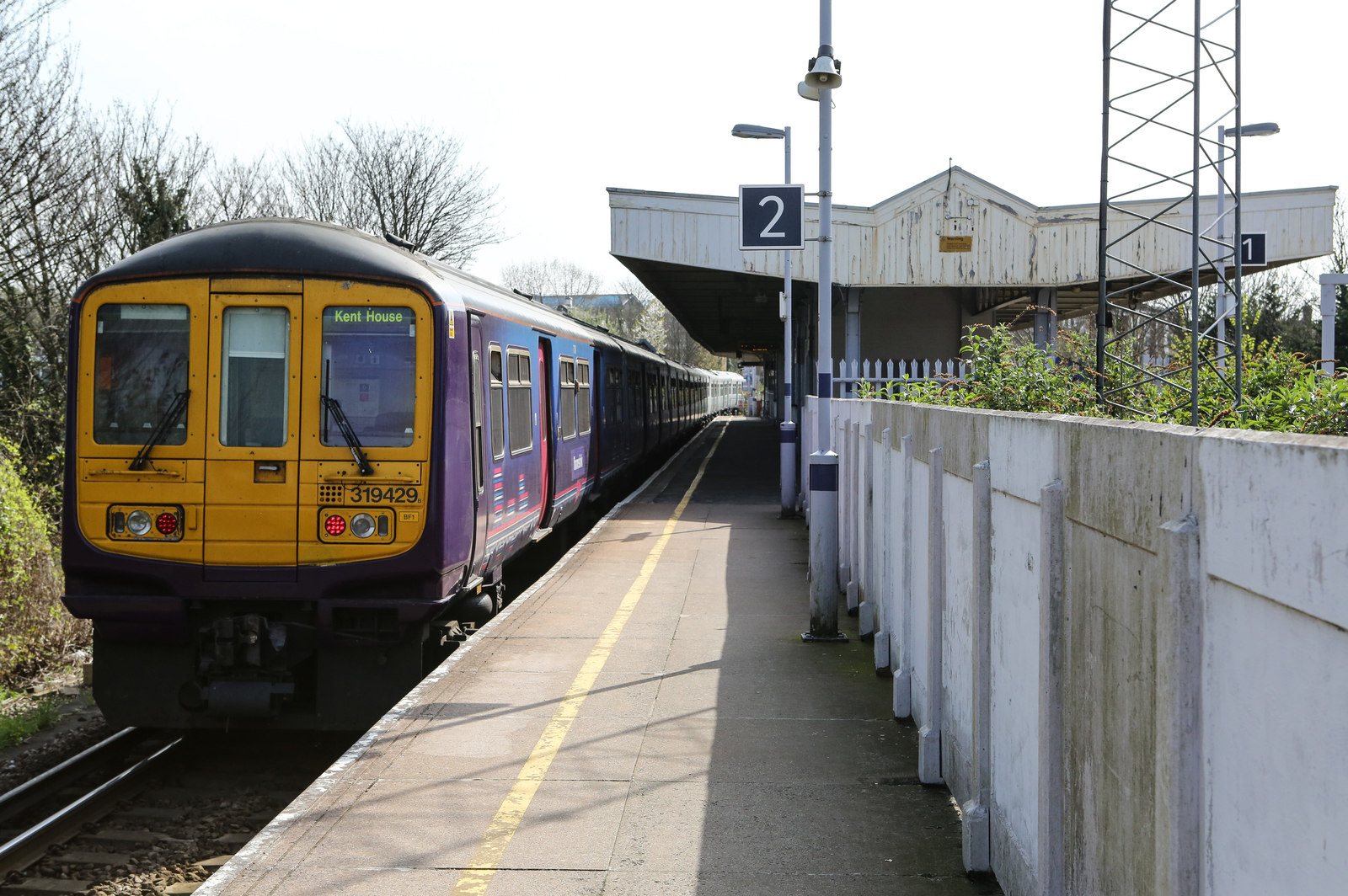
- Thameslink Class 319 at Platform 2 in April 2015
- Interactive map of Nunhead

General information
- Location: Nunhead
- Local authority: London Borough of Southwark
- Managed by: Thameslink
- Station code: NHD
- DfT category: E
- Number of platforms: 2
- Fare zone: 2

National Rail annual entry and exit
- 2020–21: ▼0.344 million
- 2021–22: ▲0.730 million
- 2022–23: ▲0.840 million
- 2023–24: ▲0.911 million
- 2024–25: ▲0.997 million

Railway companies
- Post-grouping: Southern Railway

Key dates
- 1 September 1871: Opened
- 3 May 1925: Resited north

Other information
- External links: Departures; Facilities
- Coordinates: 51.4671°N 0.0527°W

Nunhead railway station is in the Nunhead area of the London Borough of Southwark. It is 5 miles 77 chains (9.6 km) measured from London Victoria. The station is managed by Thameslink. It is in London fare zone 2.

== Services ==
Services at Nunhead are operated by Southeastern and Thameslink using 465, 466 and 700 EMUs.

The typical off-peak service in trains per hour is:

- 2 tph to London Victoria
- 2 tph to London Blackfriars
- 2 tph to Gravesend via Bexleyheath
- 2 tph to Sevenoaks via Catford

During the peak hours, additional services between Orpington, Kentish Town and Luton call at the station. In addition, the service to London Blackfriars is extended to and from Welwyn Garden City via Finsbury Park.

| Preceding station | National Rail | Following station |
|---|---|---|
| Peckham Rye | Thameslink Catford Loop Line | Crofton Park |
| Peckham Rye | Southeastern Greenwich Park Branch Line | Lewisham |

== History ==
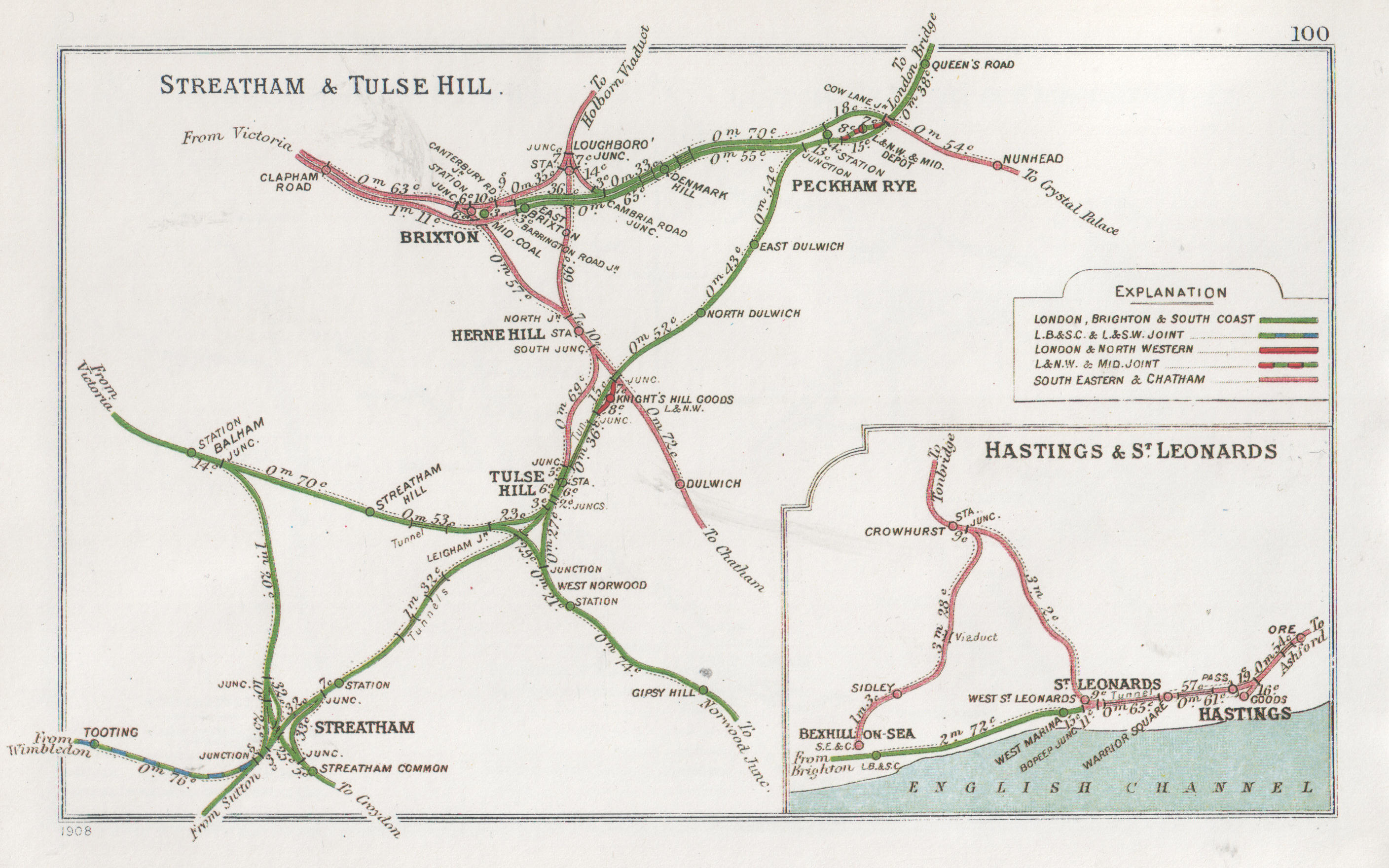
A 1908 Railway Clearing House map showing railways in the vicinity of Nunhead (upper right)

The Crystal Palace and South London Junction Railway from Canterbury Road Junction, near Brixton to Crystal Palace (High Level) was opened by the London, Chatham and Dover Railway (LCDR) on 1 August 1865, to take passengers to the Crystal Palace. Train services on the Crystal Palace High Level line ceased in 1917–1919 and 1944–1946 for wartime economies. The line closed to all traffic on 20 September 1954.

The Greenwich Park branch opened 1871 as far as Blackheath Hill, with the final stretch opening in 1888. It closed on 1 January 1917 for wartime economies. The Catford loop line opened on 1 July 1892, giving a second route out of London for the LCDR, and Nunhead became a three-way junction.

In 1925 the lines were electrified, and a new station at Nunhead was built on the London side of the original site. In 1929 the Greenwich Park branch was reopened as far as the site of Lewisham Road where a new connecting line to Lewisham enabled cross-London freight trains to be re-routed to Hither Green. The line was electrified in 1935 for peak hour passenger trains. There is now a frequent service of passenger trains.

| Preceding station | Disused railways | Following station |
|---|---|---|
| Peckham Rye; Line and station open | London, Chatham and Dover Railway; Greenwich Park branch line | Brockley Lane; Line open, station closed |
| Peckham Rye; Line and station open | London, Chatham and Dover Railway; Crystal Palace Branch | Honor Oak; Line and station closed |

== Connections ==
London Buses route P12 serves the station.
