= St Johns railway station =

National Rail station in London, England

St Johns
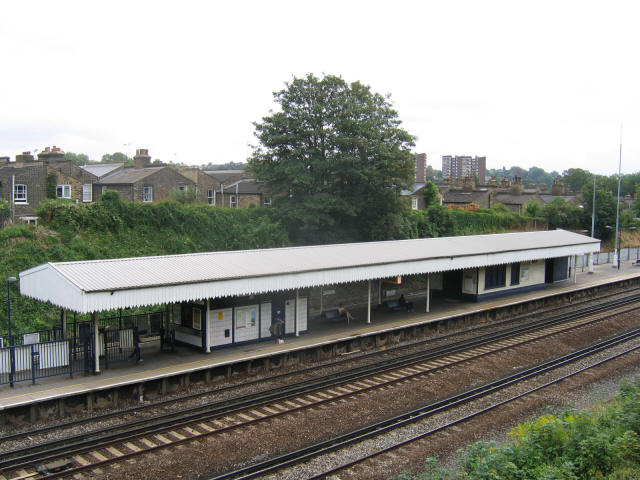
- Interactive map of St Johns

General information
- Location: St Johns
- Local authority: London Borough of Lewisham
- Managed by: Southeastern
- Station code: SAJ
- DfT category: E
- Number of platforms: 2
- Fare zone: 2

National Rail annual entry and exit
- 2020–21: ▼0.267 million
- 2021–22: ▲0.646 million
- 2022–23: ▲0.725 million
- 2023–24: ▲0.805 million
- 2024–25: ▲0.842 million

Key dates
- 1 June 1873: Opened

Other information
- External links: Departures; Facilities
- Coordinates: 51.4691°N 0.0225°W

St Johns railway station is in the London Borough of Lewisham. It lies 5 miles 47 chains (9.0 km) down the South Eastern Main Line from London Charing Cross, and is situated between New Cross and Lewisham.

== History ==
=== Early years (1873–1922) ===
The South Eastern Railway (SER) opened a two-track railway (the North Kent Line) through the site of St Johns (although the church that gave the station its name was not built until 1855) in 1849, and two further tracks were added in 1864; the station was opened on 1 June 1873. The SER was at that time engaged in a bitter feud with the London, Chatham and Dover Railway (LCDR), which opened a station (adjacent to the church) named Lewisham Road as part of the initial section of the Greenwich Park branch line in 1871; this, coupled with the development of the area, may have been a factor in the building of the station.

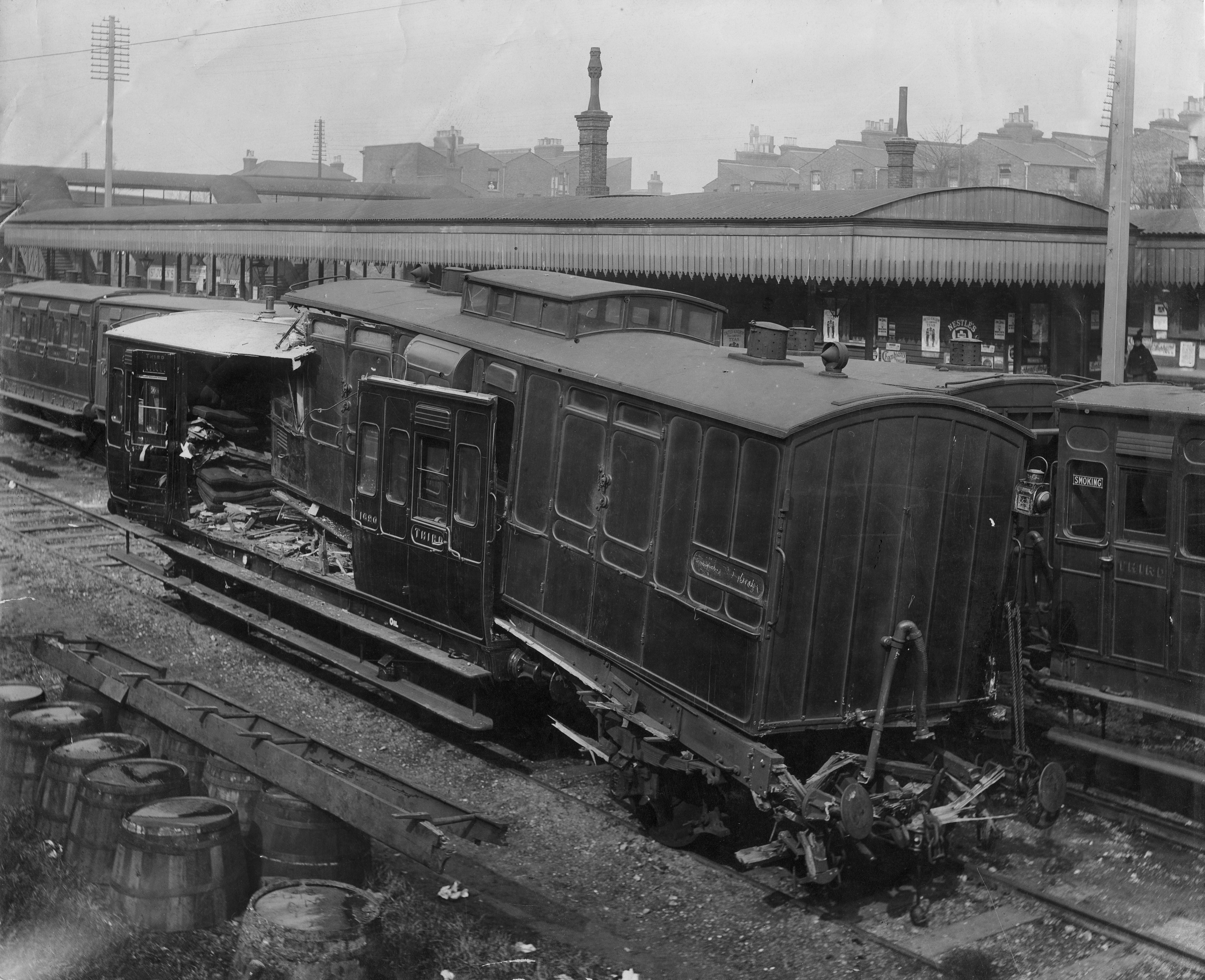
Damaged brake van and rear carriage in sidings at St Johns after the accident in 1898

On 21 March 1898, two trains collided in thick fog, killing three people, when a signaller allowed a train to enter the station while another train was at the platform.

In 1899, the South Eastern Railway and the London, Chatham and Dover Railway agreed to work as one railway company, under the name of the South Eastern and Chatham Railway.

In 1906, an additional two lines were added south of St Johns towards Hither Green with a new junction located immediately south of the station. In addition to the existing signal box which was located on the north end of the platform, a second box was provided between the North Kent lines and main lines close to the new junction.

=== Southern Railway (1923–1947) ===
Following the Railways Act 1921 (also known as the Grouping Act), St Johns became a Southern Railway station on 1 January 1923.

The main line was electrified, with the (750 V DC third rail) system, in February 1926 for the operation of electric services to Cannon Street or Charing Cross to Orpington. In the following year the bridge carrying the Greenwich Park branch line, which had closed in 1917, was removed in anticipation of the opening of the Nunhead – Lewisham line. This saw a new bridge provided with the line opening in 1929. The two signal boxes at St Johns were closed, and a new box opened just south of the station on the east side of the line.

=== British Railways (1948–1994) ===
On 1 January 1948, following nationalisation, the station passed to British Railways Southern Region.

On 4 December 1957, two trains collided just south-east of the station on the main line bypassing Lewisham, bringing down the Lewisham-Nunhead railway bridge and killing 90 people. Further disaster was averted as a train about to cross the bridge was halted by its driver.

In the mid-1970s the station was re-modelled when the fast-line island platform was closed and demolished. This provided space to build a flydown from the Lewisham-Nunhead line to the up fast line.

The booking office at street level was destroyed by fire in the late 1970s.

Upon sectorisation in 1982, passenger sectors were created: London & South East (renamed Network SouthEast in 1986) operated commuter services in the London area, including St Johns.

=== The privatisation era (1994–present day) ===
Following privatisation of British Rail on 1 April 1994, the infrastructure at St Johns station became the responsibility of Railtrack, while a business unit operated the train services. On 13 October 1996, operation of passenger services passed to Connex South Eastern, which was originally due to run the franchise until 2011.

Following a number of accidents and financial issues, Railtrack plc was sold to Network Rail on 3 October 2002, which became responsible for the infrastructure.

On 27 June 2003, the Strategic Rail Authority decided to strip Connex of the franchise citing poor financial management and run the franchise itself. Connex South Eastern continued to operate the franchise until 8 November 2003 with the services transferring to the Strategic Rail Authority's South Eastern Trains subsidiary the following day.

On 30 November 2005 the Department for Transport awarded Govia the Integrated Kent franchise. The services operated by South Eastern Trains transferred to Southeastern on 1 April 2006.

== Layout ==
As built the station had two island platforms and an additional terminating platform on the west side of the line, although it is doubtful this was ever used in regular traffic.

As of 2017, the station was reached by a footbridge from St Johns Vale, there being no direct road access. A single island platform with two platform faces remained located on the slow lines.

South of the station, the former Greenwich Park branch crossed over before closure in 1917. The line from Nunhead lay dormant until a bridge was provided and the line was connected to Lewisham in 1929. The remains of the embankment can be seen on the eastern side of the line. There was a signal box at the south end of the station; this closed and was demolished when the area was resignalled in the mid-1970s. The flydown was built at this time and commissioned on 3 April 1976.

In the early 1990s the original bridge carrying St Johns Vale was replaced. This allowed the platforms to be extended toward New Cross to allow longer trains to call.

It was proposed to double the flydown line under the Thameslink Programme. Work started in April 2012 and was completed over Easter 2013.

== Services ==
All services at St Johns are operated by Southeastern using Class 376, 465, 466 and 707 EMUs.

The typical off-peak service in trains per hour is:

- 6 tph to London Cannon Street
- 2 tph to Orpington via Grove Park
- 2 tph to Dartford via Woolwich Arsenal
- 2 tph to Slade Green via Bexleyheath, continuing to London Cannon Street via Woolwich Arsenal and Greenwich

Additional services, including trains to and from London Cannon Street via Sidcup call at the station during the peak hours.

Preceding station	National Rail	Following station
New Cross	Southeastern Grove Park Line	Hither Green
New Cross	Southeastern North Kent Line	Lewisham
New Cross	Southeastern Bexleyheath Line	Lewisham
New Cross	Southeastern Dartford Loop Line Peak Hours Only	Lewisham
