= Lewisham station =

Docklands Light Railway and National Rail station in London, England

Lewisham
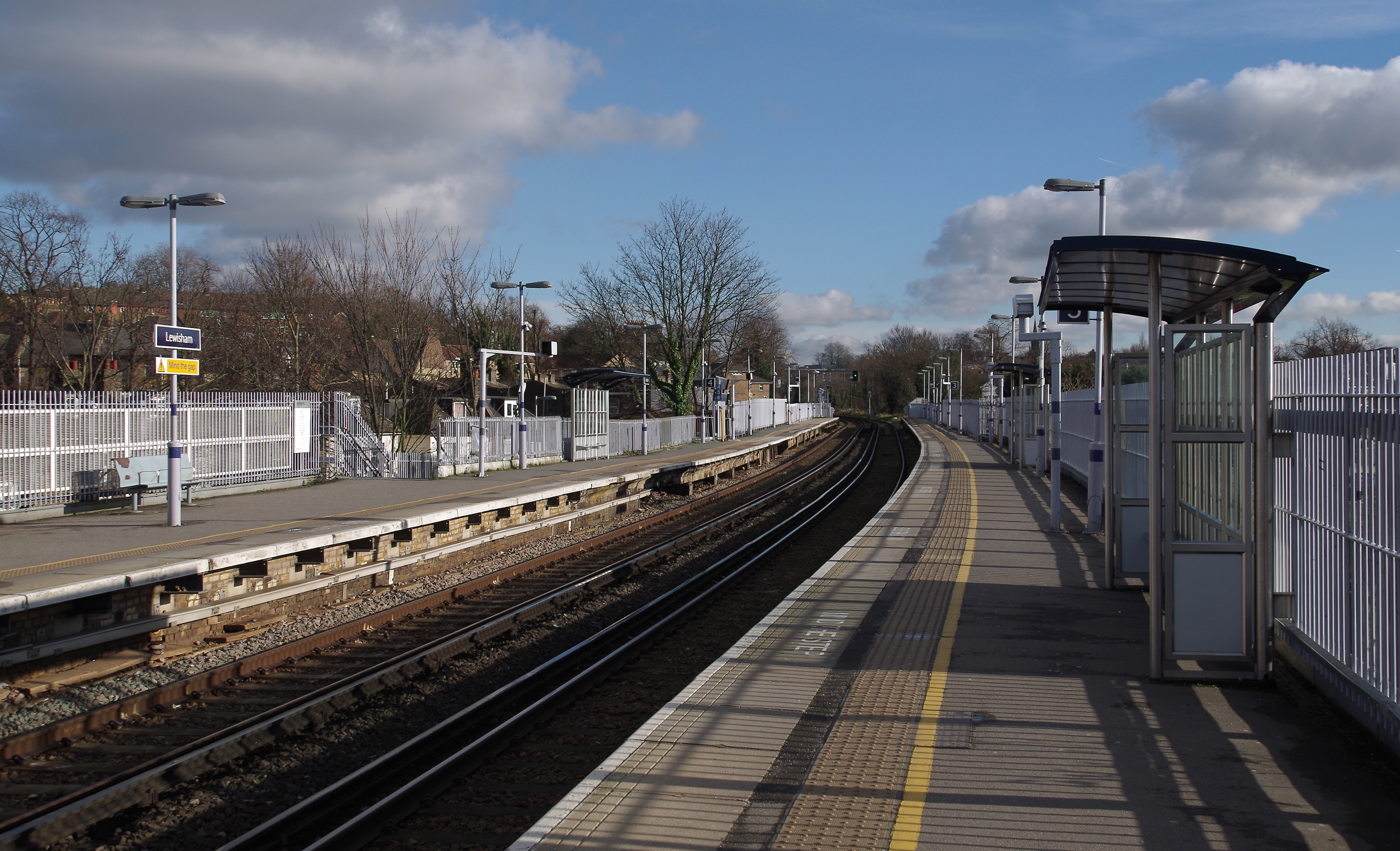
- National Rail station
- Interactive map of Lewisham

General information
- Location: Lewisham
- Local authority: London Borough of Lewisham
- Managed by: Southeastern, Docklands Light Railway
- Station code: LEW
- DfT category: C2
- Number of platforms: 4 NR, 2 DLR
- Accessible: Yes(DLR and 4 NR platforms)
- Fare zone: 2 and 3

DLR annual boardings and alightings
- 2021: ▲4.701 million
- 2022: ▲7.030 million
- 2023: ▲7.560 million
- 2024: ▼7.2 million
- 2025: ▼6.31 million

National Rail annual entry and exit
- 2020–21: ▼2.555 million
- Interchange: ▼0.564 million
- 2021–22: ▲5.249 million
- Interchange: ▲1.320 million
- 2022–23: ▲5.918 million
- Interchange: ▲2.154 million
- 2023–24: ▲6.551 million
- Interchange: ▼1.600 million
- 2024–25: ▲7.024 million
- Interchange: ▼1.505 million

Key dates
- 30 July 1849: First station opened
- 1 January 1857: Present station opened as Lewisham Junction
- 7 July 1929: Renamed Lewisham
- 20 November 1999: DLR extension

Other information
- External links: Departures; Facilities
- Coordinates: 51.4653°N 0.0133°W

Lewisham is an interchange station in the area of Lewisham, south-east London. It is the terminus for Docklands Light Railway (DLR) services from Bank or Stratford stations, as well as a National Rail station on the North Kent Line and Hayes line. On the National Rail network, it lies 7 miles 61 chains (12.5 km) from London Victoria and is operated by Southeastern.

The station was originally opened in 1849 by the South Eastern Railway's line to Strood, before being added to the Hayes Line (known then as the Mid-Kent line) in 1857. The station was electrified in 1926 using the third rail system. It was then expanded in 1976 while part of the British Rail Southern Region. After privatisation, services were taken over by Southeastern, first ran by Govia and then the DfT Operator.

== History ==
=== Opening and early years (1849–1922) ===
The North Kent line opened on 30 July 1849 by the South Eastern Railway linking Strood with the London and Greenwich Railway route to London Bridge. The original station was located east of the Lewisham Road overbridge, with access off Lewisham Road. With the opening of the Mid-Kent line on 1 January 1857, a new station was built to the west so both lines could be served. For a period, Old Lewisham station was also kept open.

In 1898, the South Eastern Railway and the London Chatham and Dover Railway agreed to work as one railway company under the name of the South Eastern and Chatham Railway.

=== Southern Railway (1923–1947) ===
Following the Railways Act 1921 (also known as the Grouping Act), Lewisham became a Southern Railway station on 1 January 1923. The Mid-Kent line was electrified with services commencing on 28 February 1926. The North Kent Line was electrified with the (750 V DC third rail) system. Electrification was initially to Dartford (6 June 1926) and was extended to Gillingham by the Second World War. In 1929, large-scale remodelling of the junction was undertaken to enable cross-London freight traffic to be routed via Nunhead and Loughborough Junction. The new route utilised part of the former Greenwich Park branch, which had closed in 1917, and included an overpass.

The loop between Lewisham and the main line towards Hither Green, which had opened in 1929, was electrified on 16 July 1933, allowing Sidcup and Orpington local electric services to call. The Nunhead line was electrified in summer 1935 and opened to electric traffic on 30 September 1935, with services from Bexleyheath and Sidcup to St Paul's (later renamed Blackfriars). This service was cancelled during the Second World War as an economy measure, and recommenced on 12 August 1946.

=== British Railways (1948–1994) ===
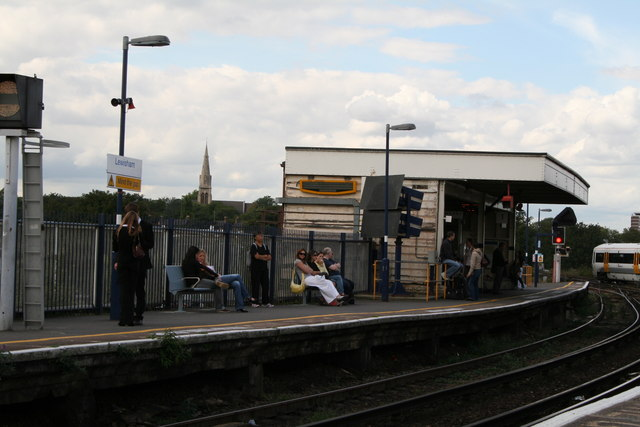
Platform 1 at Lewisham station

After the Second World War and following nationalisation on 1 January 1948, the station fell under the auspices of British Railways' Southern Region. As part of the London Bridge resignalling, a new loop line was opened with a reversible track down to the west (fast line) side of St Johns, which opened up on 1 April 1976. Upon sectorisation in 1982, London & South East operated commuter services in the area; it was renamed Network SouthEast in 1986.

=== Franchise (1994–present day) ===
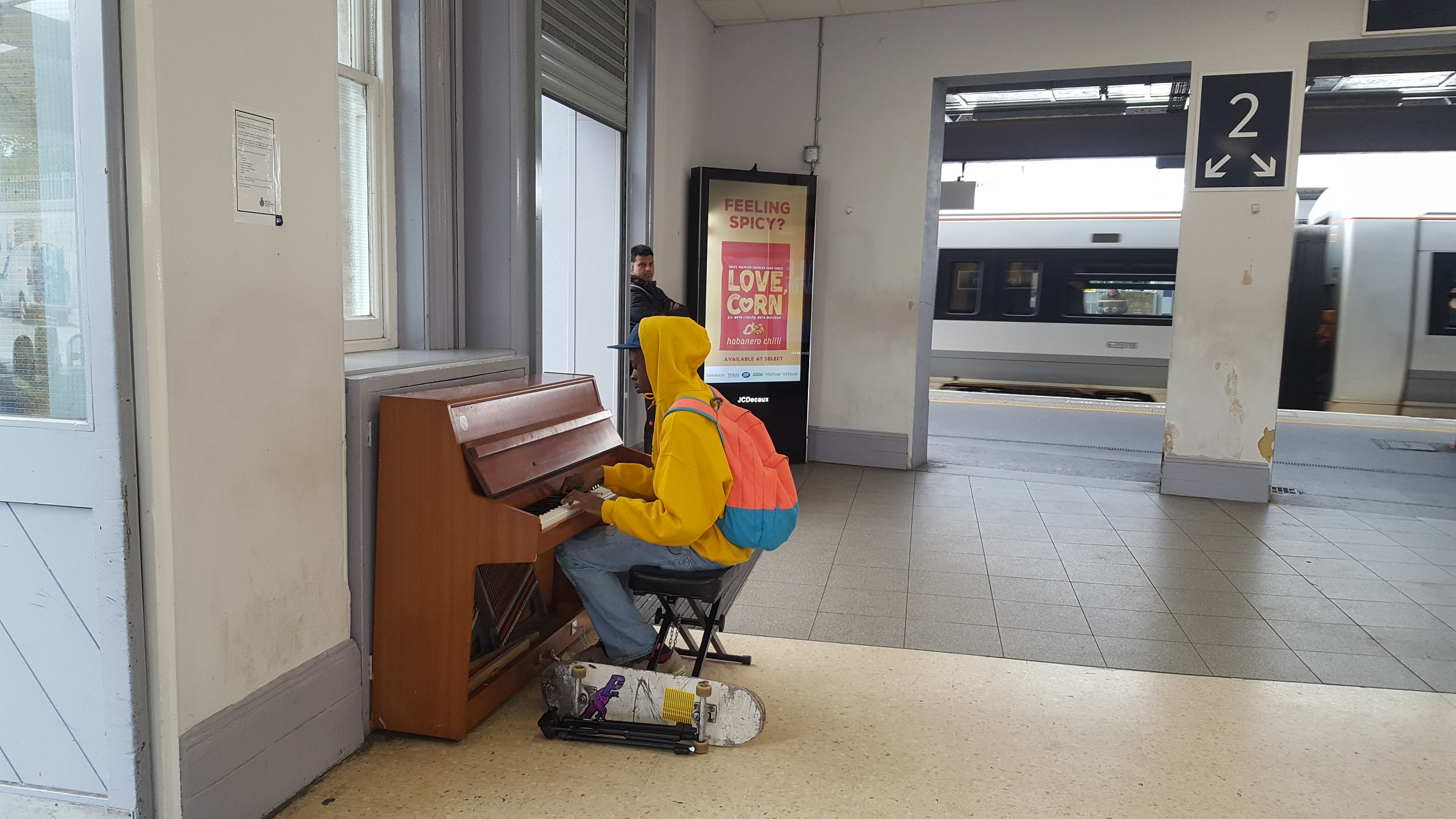
The piano on the station concourse

Following privatisation of British Rail on 1 April 1994, the infrastructure became the responsibility of Railtrack; operation of passenger services passed to Connex South Eastern on 13 October 1996. On 22 November 1999, Deputy Prime Minister John Prescott opened the 2.6 miles (4.2 km) Lewisham extension of the Docklands Light Railway, with trains running through to Bank.

On 30 November 2005, the Department for Transport awarded Govia the Integrated Kent franchise. The services operated by South Eastern Trains transferred to Southeastern on 1 April 2006. The loop line to St Johns was doubled in 2013. There was formerly a bus terminus within the station, but this was relocated to Thurston Road as part of the Lewisham Gateway project.

=== Accidents and incidents ===
- On 28 June 1857, eleven passengers were killed in the 1857 Lewisham rail crash, when a train ran into the back of a stationary train.
- On 4 December 1957, the Lewisham rail crash occurred to the west of the station, in which there were 90 fatalities. A plaque at the station commemorates this incident.
- In the early morning hours of 24 January 2017, a GB Railfreight train travelling from Grain to Neasden derailed at Lewisham. Although no railway workers or passengers were injured in the derailment, it caused widespread disruption across the Southeastern system, with numerous delays and cancellations for the day.
- On the evening of 2 March 2018, during exceptionally cold weather, several trains were delayed close to the station and passengers evacuated the train and went on to the tracks.

== Layout ==
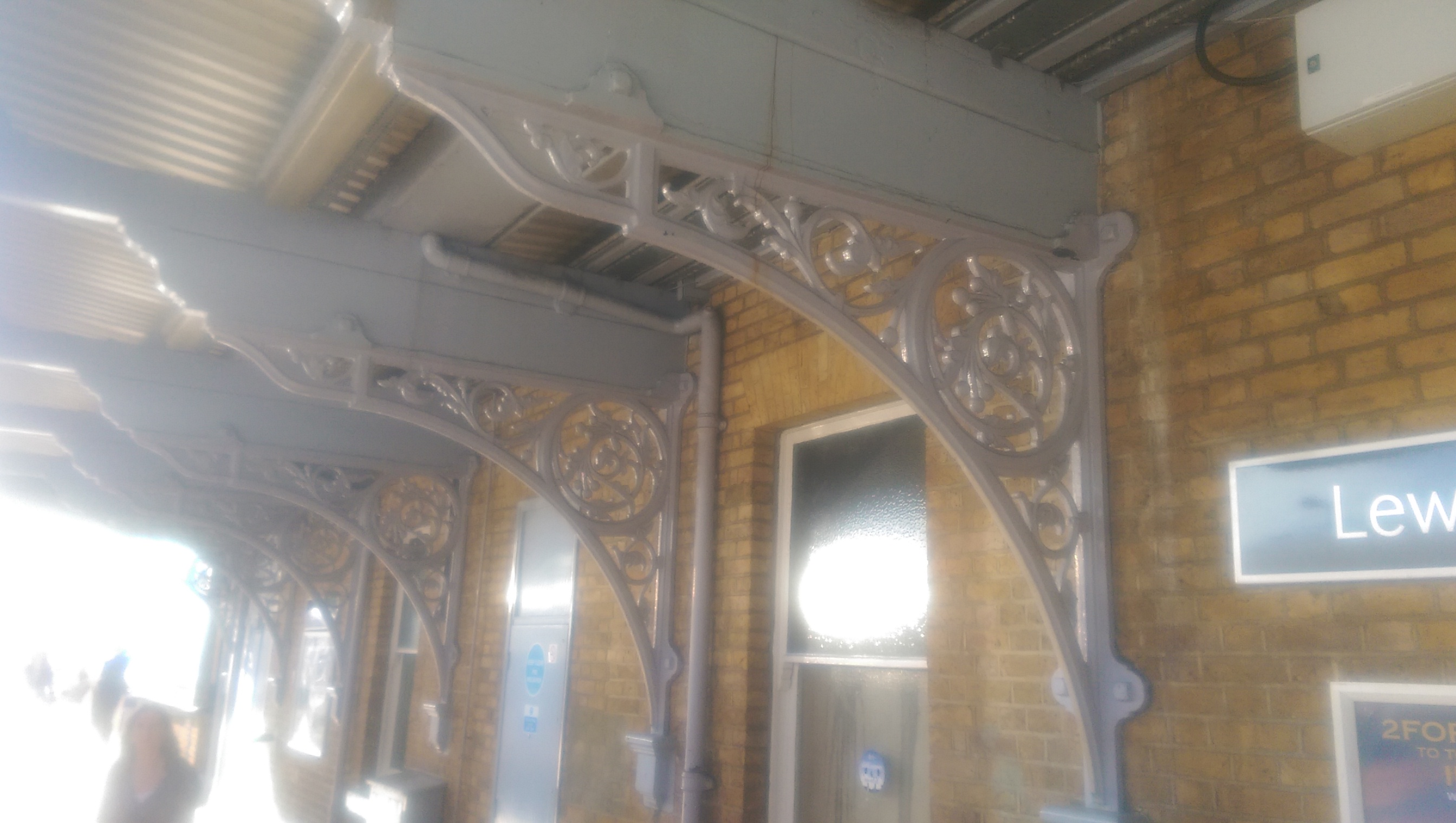
Elaborate cast iron brackets

There are four platforms for main line trains:

- 1 and 2 on the Mid-Kent line, which is also used as a loop off the South Eastern Main Line
- 3 and 4 on the North Kent Line.

The current station, which dates back to 1857, is constructed of yellow stock brick with stone dressing. Behind it survives, rather unusually, a wooden clapboard building. The facade is symmetrical, with three entrance doors and three windows. The original doors, sash windows, skirting, tiling and banisters are present inside. The original corniced ceiling of the main hall is currently concealed by a lowered fake ceiling. Platform 3 has kept its original canopy, with its cast iron brackets that depict cherries. Some of the original chamfered wood and cast iron supports of the original canopy survive on platform 2. The station has similarities with other listed stations built at around the same time, such as Ladywell, Blackheath and Gravesend which have the same cast iron supporting brackets.

Platforms 5 and 6 are served by DLR trains to Bank and Stratford. The DLR station opened in 1999 following a southward extension from Island Gardens. The original canopy over Platform 4 was demolished at some point after 1990. The original canopy over the main entrance was demolished in 2009 at a cost of £790k and replaced with a steel version.

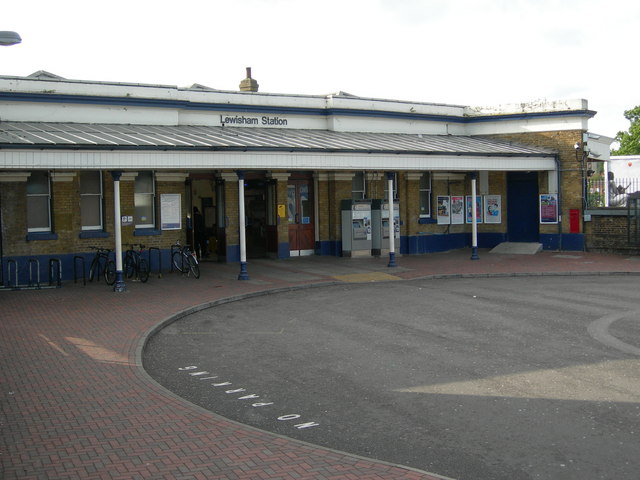
Lewisham station entrance

From December 2009, the station was fitted with electric ticket gates, in line with the Government's new strategy to give all Greater London National Rail stations Oyster card accessibility and closing access to those who attempt to travel without tickets. This was controversial as it involved the closure of the gate on platform 4 and led to a petition signed by over 1,000 people.

British Transport Police also maintains a neighbourhood policing presence at Lewisham.

== Services ==
Lewisham is the southern terminus of the Docklands Light Railway (DLR), the previous station being Elverson Road. It is on the boundary of London fare zone 2 and 3 and is a major transport hub, with many buses passing through or terminating here. During infrastructure works on the Greenwich Line, Thameslink services are normally diverted through Lewisham, giving it a temporary link to Luton in the north and Rainham in the east.

=== National Rail ===
National Rail services at Lewisham are operated by Southeastern using Class 376, 465, 466 and 707 electric multiple units.

The typical off-peak service in trains per hour is:

- 6 tph to London Charing Cross (non-stop to London Bridge)
- 4 tph to London Cannon Street (all stations)
- 2 tph to London Victoria
- 2 tph to Sevenoaks via Grove Park
- 2 tph to Hayes via Catford Bridge
- 2 tph to Dartford via Sidcup
- 2 tph to Slade Green via Bexleyheath, continuing to London Cannon Street via Woolwich Arsenal and Greenwich
- 2 tph to Dartford via Bexleyheath
- 2 tph to Gravesend via Woolwich Arsenal

Additional trains serve the station during peak hours.

=== Docklands Light Railway ===
The typical off-peak service from Lewisham is 12 trains per hour to and from Bank. Additional services run to and from the station during peak hours, increasing the service to up to 22 trains per hour, with up to 8 trains per hour running to and from Stratford instead of Bank.

Preceding station	National Rail	Following station
London Bridge	Southeastern Dartford Loop Line	Hither Green
London Bridge	Southeastern Grove Park Line	Hither Green
London Bridge	Southeastern Hayes Line	Ladywell
St Johns	Southeastern North Kent Line	Blackheath
St Johns	Southeastern Bexleyheath Line	Blackheath
Nunhead	Southeastern Greenwich Park Branch Line	Blackheath
DLR
Elverson Road towards Bank or Stratford	Docklands Light Railway	Terminus
	Future Development	
Preceding station	LUL	Following station
New Cross Gate towards Harrow & Wealdstone	Bakerloo line Bakerloo line extension	Terminus
	Abandoned Plans	
Preceding station	LUL	Following station
New Cross towards Stanmore	Jubilee line Phase 3 (never constructed)	Terminus

== Planned London Underground services ==
=== Fleet line service ===
In 1971 and 1972, parliamentary approval was given for construction of Phases 2 and 3 of the planned Fleet line. Phase 3 of the proposal would have extended the line from Fenchurch Street to Lewisham, with new platforms constructed underground. Further plans for Phase 4 of the extension considered the line taking over the mainline tracks on the Addiscombe and Hayes branch lines. Preliminary construction works were carried out elsewhere on the extension before the plan was postponed by lack of funds. Following a change of name to Jubilee line, the first part of the line opened in 1979 but the remaining plans were not carried out. When the Jubilee line was extended in 1999, a different route to Stratford was followed.

=== Bakerloo line service ===
TfL is currently considering extending the Bakerloo line to Lewisham. In 2024 TfL suggested that, if approved, development of plans might take nine years, followed by a further seven years of construction, so first trains might be running by 2040. In its draft Kent Route Utilisation Strategy, Network Rail mentions the possibility of extending the Bakerloo line from Elephant & Castle to Lewisham, and then taking over the Hayes branch line. Network Rail states that this would free up six paths per hour into central London and so increasing capacity on the Tonbridge main line, which would also relieve the junctions around Lewisham.

== Connections ==
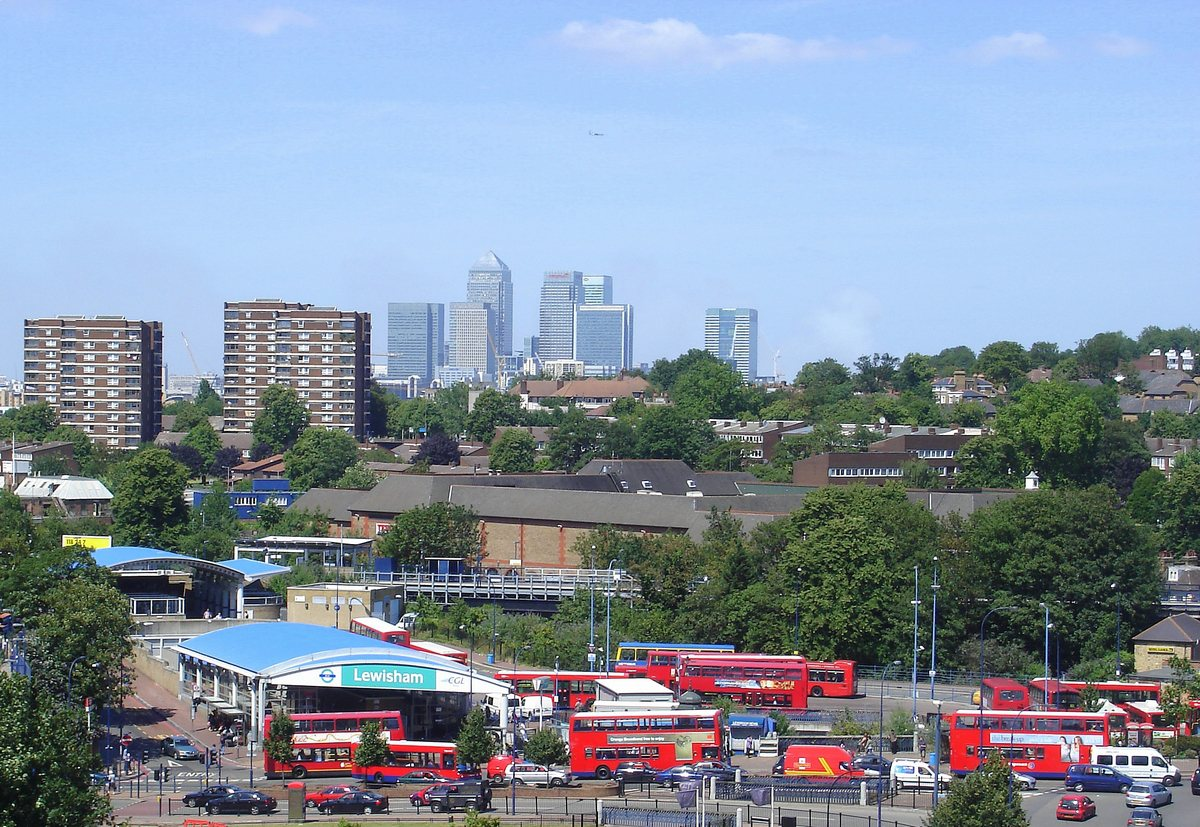
The original bus station in 2006.

London Buses routes 21, 47, 75, 89, 129, 136, 178, 181, 185, 199, 208, 225, 261, 273, 284, 321, 380, 436, 484, BL1, P4, school route 621 and night routes N21, N89, N136 and N199 serve the station.

Lewisham previously had an adjoining bus station for terminating routes. The station closed on 28 February 2014 for the major Lewisham Gateway redevelopment project.
