= List of railway stations in Kent =

Map showing the location of Kent within England

This is a list of railway stations in Kent, a county in the South East of England. It includes all railway stations that are part of the National Rail network, and which are currently open and have timetabled train services. Southeastern provides most of these services, while Southern and Thameslink provide the remainder.

The majority of services run into one of the London terminals of Blackfriars, Cannon Street, Charing Cross, London Bridge and Victoria.

== Stations ==
Station (and code)	Managed by	Lines served	Station users 2021/22	Year opened	Borough
Adisham (ADM)	Southeastern	Chatham Main Line	19,464	1861	Canterbury
Appledore (APD)	Southern	Marshlink Line	24,818	1851	Ashford
Ashford International (AFK)	Southeastern	Ashford to Ramsgate (via Canterbury West) Line; Eurostar; High Speed 1 Maidstone East Line; Marshlink Line; South Eastern Main Line	2,656,922	1842	Ashford
Ashurst (AHS)	Southern	Oxted line	18,842	1888	Tunbridge Wells
Aylesford (AYL)	Southeastern	Medway Valley Line	117,816	1856	Tonbridge and Malling
Aylesham (AYH)	Southeastern	Chatham Main Line	96,992	1928	Dover
Barming (BMG)	Southeastern	Maidstone East Line	160,132	1874	Tonbridge and Malling
Bat and Ball (BBL)	Southeastern	Thameslink	133,826	1862	Sevenoaks
Bearsted (BSD)	Southeastern	Maidstone East Line	202,754	1884	Maidstone
Bekesbourne (BKS)	Southeastern	Chatham Main Line	19,584	1861	Canterbury
Beltring (BEG)	Southeastern	Medway Valley Line	10,560	1909	Maidstone
Birchington-on-Sea (BCH)	Southeastern	Chatham Main Line	282,836	1863	Thanet
Borough Green and Wrotham (BRG)	Southeastern	Maidstone East Line	269,350	1874	Tonbridge and Malling
Broadstairs (BSR)	Southeastern	Ashford to Ramsgate (via Canterbury West) Line; Chatham Main Line	494,548	1863	Thanet
Canterbury East (CBE)	Southeastern	Chatham Main Line	770,802	1860	Canterbury
Canterbury West (CBW)	Southeastern	Ashford to Ramsgate (via Canterbury West) Line	1,793,700	1846	Canterbury
Charing (CHG)	Southeastern	Maidstone East Line	60,508	1884	Ashford
Chartham (CRT)	Southeastern	Ashford to Ramsgate (via Canterbury West) line	64,192	1859	Canterbury
Chatham (CTM)	Southeastern	Chatham Main Line; North Kent Line	1,729,376	1858	Medway
Chestfield & Swalecliffe (CSW)	Southeastern	Chatham Main Line	71,064	1930	Canterbury
Chilham (CIL)	Southeastern	Ashford to Ramsgate (via Canterbury West) line	40,214	1846	Ashford
Cowden (CWN)	Southern	Oxted line	30,608	1888	Sevenoaks
Cuxton (CUX)	Southeastern	Medway Valley Line	46,312	1856	Medway
Dartford (DFD)	Southeastern	Bexleyheath Line; Dartford Loop Line; North Kent Line	3,152,900	1849	Dartford
Deal (DEA)	Southeastern	Kent Coast Line	393,602	1846	Dover
Dover Priory (DVP)	Southeastern	Chatham Main Line; Kent Coast Line; South Eastern Main Line	732,322	1861	Dover
Dumpton Park (DMP)	Southeastern	Chatham Main Line	23,252	1926	Thanet
Dunton Green (DNG)	Southeastern	South Eastern Main Line	152,576	1868	Sevenoaks
East Farleigh (EFL)	Southeastern	Medway Valley Line	23,248	1844	Maidstone
East Malling (EML)	Southeastern	Maidstone East Line	57,882	1913	Tonbridge and Malling
Ebbsfleet International (EBD)	Network Rail (High Speed)	Eurostar; High Speed 1	1,212,836	2007	Dartford
Edenbridge (EBR)	Southern	Redhill to Tonbridge Line	134,766	1842	Sevenoaks
Edenbridge Town (EBT)	Southern	Oxted line	246,726	1888	Sevenoaks
Eynsford (EYN)	Southeastern	Maidstone East Line; Thameslink	105,196	1862	Sevenoaks
Farningham Road (FNR)	Southeastern	Chatham Main Line	104,164	1860	Dartford
Faversham (FAV)	Southeastern	Chatham Main Line	1,119,620	1858	Swale
Folkestone Central (FKC)	Southeastern	South Eastern Main Line	682,674	1884	Shepway
Folkestone West (FKW)	Southeastern	South Eastern Main Line; Venice Simplon Orient Express	513,322	1863	Shepway
Gillingham (GLM)	Southeastern	Chatham Main Line; North Kent Line	1,860,628	1858	Medway
Gravesend (GRV)	Southeastern	North Kent Line	1,891,762	1849	Gravesham
Greenhithe (GNH)	Southeastern	North Kent Line; Victoria - Gravesend line	575,172	1849	Dartford
Halling (HAI)	Southeastern	Medway Valley Line	63,266	1890	Medway
Ham Street (HMT)	Southern	Marshlink Line	57,486	1851	Ashford
Harrietsham (HRM)	Southeastern	Maidstone East Line	65,058	1884	Maidstone
Headcorn (HCN)	Southeastern	South Eastern Main Line	361,320	1842	Maidstone
Herne Bay (HNB)	Southeastern	Chatham Main Line	634,886	1849	Canterbury
Hever (HEV)	Southern	Oxted line	29,784	1888	Sevenoaks
High Brooms (HIB)	Southeastern	Hastings line	775,584	1893	Tunbridge Wells
Higham (HGM)	Southeastern	North Kent Line	95,064	1845	Gravesham
Hildenborough (HLB)	Southeastern	South Eastern Main Line	236,520	1868	Tonbridge and Malling
Hollingbourne (HBN)	Southeastern	Maidstone East Line	44,650	1884	Maidstone
Kearsney (KSN)	Southeastern	Chatham Main Line	36,656	1862	Dover
Kemsing (KMS)	Southeastern	Maidstone East Line	9,478	1874	Sevenoaks
Kemsley (KML)	Southeastern	Sheerness Line	151,724	1927	Swale
Leigh (LIH)	Southern	Redhill–Tonbridge line	29,750	1911	Sevenoaks
Lenham (LEN)	Southeastern	Maidstone East Line	87,584	1884	Maidstone
Longfield (LGF)	Southeastern	Chatham Main Line	314,316	1872	Dartford
Maidstone Barracks (MDB)	Southeastern	Medway Valley Line	176,148	1874	Maidstone
Maidstone East (MDE)	Southeastern	Maidstone East Line	884,070	1874	Maidstone
Maidstone West (MDW)	Southeastern	Medway Valley Line	548,832	1844	Maidstone
Marden (MRN)	Southeastern	South Eastern Main Line	333,728	1842	Maidstone
Margate (MAR)	Southeastern	Ashford to Ramsgate (via Canterbury West) Line; Chatham Main Line	884,110	1863	Thanet
Martin Mill (MTM)	Southeastern	Kent Coast Line	37,658	1881	Dover
Meopham (MEP)	Southeastern	Chatham Main Line	181,014	1861	Gravesham
Minster (MSR)	Southeastern	Ashford to Ramsgate (via Canterbury West) Line	49,964	1846	Thanet
New Hythe (NHE)	Southeastern	Medway Valley Line	128,272	1929	Tonbridge and Malling
Newington (NGT)	Southeastern	Chatham Main Line	102,046	1862	Swale
Northfleet (NFL)	Southeastern	North Kent Line	126,980	1849	Gravesham
Otford (OTF)	Southeastern	Maidstone East Line; Thameslink	266,982	1882	Sevenoaks
Paddock Wood (PDW)	Southeastern	Medway Valley Line; South Eastern Main Line	742,026	1842	Tunbridge Wells
Penshurst (PHR)	Southern	Redhill to Tonbridge Line	39,256	1842	Sevenoaks
Pluckley (PLC)	Southeastern	South Eastern Main Line	69,456	1842	Ashford
Queenborough (QBR)	Southeastern	Sheerness Line	149,976	1860	Swale
Rainham (RAI)	Southeastern	Chatham Main Line	1,155,326	1858	Medway
Ramsgate (RAM)	Southeastern	Ashford to Ramsgate (via Canterbury West) Line; Chatham Main Line; Kent Coast Line	1,006,648	1926	Thanet
Rochester (RTR)	Southeastern	Chatham Main Line; North Kent Line	1,458,322	1892 (Old Station) 2015 (New Station)	Medway
Sandling (SDG)	Southeastern	South Eastern Main Line	53,828	1888	Folkestone & Hythe
Sandwich (SDW)	Southeastern	Kent Coast Line	282,258	1846	Dover
Selling (SEG)	Southeastern	Chatham Main Line	63,386	1860	Swale
Sevenoaks (SEV)	Southeastern	Hastings Line; South Eastern Main Line; Thameslink	2,457,352	1868	Sevenoaks
Sheerness-on-Sea (SSS)	Southeastern	Sheerness Line	332,398	1883	Swale
Shepherds Well (SPH)	Southeastern	Chatham Main Line	37,758	1861	Dover
Shoreham (SEH)	Southeastern	Maidstone East Line; Thameslink	49,002	1862	Sevenoaks
Sittingbourne (SIT)	Southeastern	Chatham Main Line; Sheerness Line	1,659,200	1858	Swale
Snodland (SDA)	Southeastern	Medway Valley Line	214,130	1856	Tonbridge and Malling
Snowdown (SWO)	Southeastern	Chatham Main Line	10,460	1914	Dover
Sole Street (SOR)	Southeastern	Chatham Main Line	39,570	1861	Gravesham
Staplehurst (SPU)	Southeastern	South Eastern Main Line	474,110	1842	Maidstone
Stone Crossing (SCG)	Southeastern	North Kent Line	173,650	1908	Dartford
Strood (SOO)	Southeastern	Chatham Main Line; Medway Valley Line	871,946	1893	Medway
Sturry (STU)	Southeastern	Ashford to Ramsgate (via Canterbury West) line	72,344	1847	Canterbury
Swale (SWL)	Southeastern	Sheerness Line	10,154	1913	Swale
Swanley (SAY)	Southeastern	Chatham Main Line; Maidstone East Line; Thameslink	922,280	1862	Sevenoaks
Swanscombe (SWM)	Southeastern	North Kent Line	209,558	1908	Dartford
Teynham (TEY)	Southeastern	Chatham Main Line	119,432	1858	Swale
Thanet Parkway (THP)	Southeastern	Ashford to Ramsgate (via Canterbury West) Line	N/A (Not Opened)	2023	Thanet
Tonbridge (TON)	Southeastern and Southern	Hastings Line; Medway Valley Line; Redhill to Tonbridge Line; South Eastern Main Line	2,985,822	1842	Tonbridge and Malling
Tunbridge Wells (TBW)	Southeastern	Hastings Line	2,096,900	1846	Tunbridge Wells
Walmer (WAM)	Southeastern	Kent Coast Line	147,402	1881	Dover
Wateringbury (WTR)	Southeastern	Medway Valley Line	50,202	1844	Tonbridge and Malling
West Malling (WMA)	Southeastern	Maidstone East Line	458,918	1874	Tonbridge and Malling
Westenhanger (WHA)	Southeastern	South Eastern Main Line	45,092	1844	Folkestone & Hythe
Westgate-on-Sea (WGA)	Southeastern	Chatham Main Line	105,496	1871	Thanet
Whitstable (WHI)	Southeastern	Chatham Main Line	634,860	1915	Canterbury
Wye (WYE)	Southeastern	Ashford to Ramsgate (via Canterbury West) line	168,654	1846	Ashford
Yalding (YAL)	Southeastern	Medway Valley Line	29,968	1844	Maidstone

== See also ==
- List of railway stations in Dover
- List of railway stations in Essex
