= St Mary Cray railway station =

National Rail station in London, England

St Mary Cray
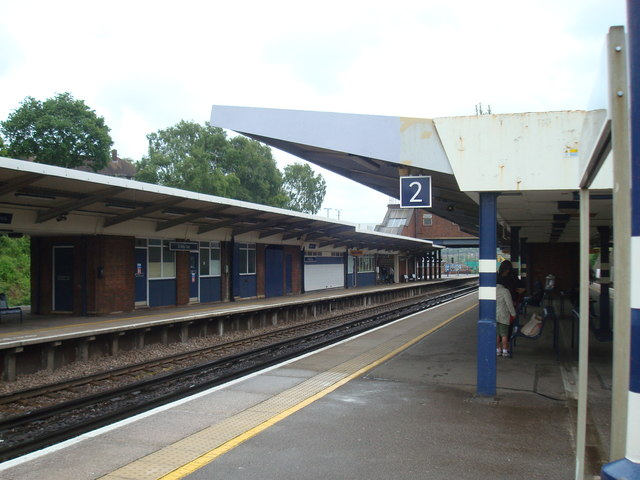
- Interactive map of St Mary Cray

General information
- Location: St Mary Cray
- Local authority: London Borough of Bromley
- Managed by: Southeastern
- Station code: SMY
- DfT category: C2
- Number of platforms: 4
- Fare zone: 6

National Rail annual entry and exit
- 2020–21: ▼0.520 million
- 2021–22: ▲1.064 million
- 2022–23: ▲1.142 million
- 2023–24: ▲1.268 million
- 2024–25: ▲1.335 million

Key dates
- 3 December 1860: Opened
- 1959: rebuilt and lines quadrupled

Other information
- External links: Departures; Facilities
- Coordinates: 51.394°N 0.106°E

St Mary Cray railway station is in St Mary Cray, South East London within the London Borough of Bromley. It is 14 miles 57 chains (23.7 km) down the line from London Victoria. Train services are operated by Southeastern, who manage the station, and Thameslink.

It is in London fare zone 6, and the station is managed by Southeastern. Services are provided by Southeastern, and Thameslink. The station has four platforms, platforms 1 and 3 being for services to Central London via Bromley South, platform 2 for services to Sevenoaks and Ashford International and platform 4 for services to Gillingham.

To the west of the station the Up and Down Chatham Loop lines give access to the South Eastern Main Line where the next station is Chislehurst. There are normally no direct trains between Chislehurst and St Mary Cray, as trains that use the connecting curves usually run non-stop between London Bridge and either Rochester or Swanley.

Access to the station is from a footbridge built over the railway. The footbridge is not part of the station (albeit painted in typical southeastern colours) with the entrance to the station built on the footbridge. The footbridge was refurbished in 2016. Lifts, cycle-shelters, ramps and handrails were added to improve access early in 2022. The station has 4 Oystercard readers rather than ticket barriers. 2 ticket machines are present near the footbridge.

The station is fully staffed from the first train to the last of the day, as all trains (except for Thameslink services) are dispatched by platform staff.

== History ==
The station originally had two side platforms with the tracks in between. It was reconstructed in 1959 and now has two island platforms with tracks on either side of each.

== Location ==
The station is situated on Sayes Court Road, a short distance from the Nugent Retail Park.

== Services ==
Services at St Mary Cray are operated by Southeastern and Thameslink using Class 375, 377, 465, 466 and 700 EMUs.

The typical off-peak service in trains per hour is:

- 2 tph to London Victoria (semi-fast)
- 2 tph to London Blackfriars via Catford
- 2 tph to Sevenoaks
- 1 tph to Gillingham
- 1 tph to Ashford International via Maidstone East

Additional services call at the station during the peak hours. In addition, the service to London Blackfriars is extended to and from Welwyn Garden City via Finsbury Park.

Preceding station	National Rail	Following station
Bromley South	Southeastern Chatham Main Line	Swanley
Bromley South	Southeastern Kent Downs line	Swanley
Bickley	Thameslink Darent Valley Line	Swanley

== Connections ==
London Buses routes, 273, B14, R1, and R11 and night route N199 serve the station.
