= Shoreham railway station =

Railway station in Kent, England

Coordinates: 51.332°N 0.189°E

Shoreham (Kent)
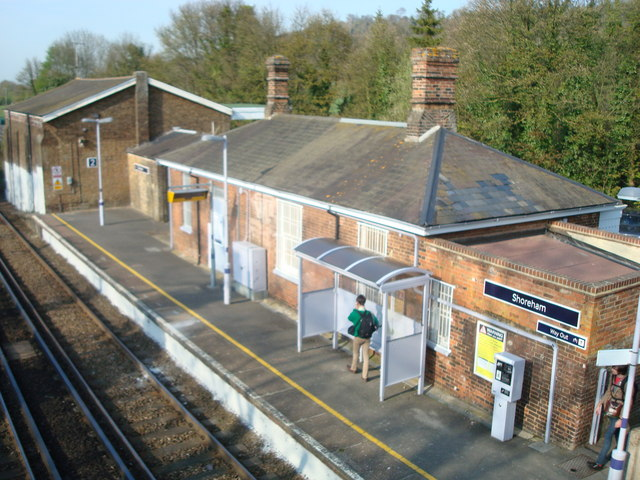

General information
- Location: Shoreham, District of Sevenoaks; England
- Grid reference: TQ525615
- Managed by: Southeastern
- Platforms: 2

Other information
- Station code: SEH
- Classification: DfT category F1

Key dates
- 2 June 1862: Opened

Passengers
- 2020/21: ▼19,084
- 2021/22: ▲49,002
- 2022/23: ▲55,256
- 2023/24: ▲68,866
- 2024/25: ▲82,766
Location
Notes
- Passenger statistics from the Office of Rail and Road

Shoreham railway station serves Shoreham in Kent, England. It is 22 miles 52 chains (36.5 km) down the line from London Victoria and is situated between Eynsford and Otford. Train services are provided by Thameslink.

== History ==
Shoreham Station was opened by the London, Chatham and Dover Railway on 2 June 1862, the same day as the Swanley to Sevenoaks Bat & Ball opened. The line was initially single track - the second track opened in 1863.

The line through Shoreham between Bickley and Sevenoaks was electrified in 1935 and electric services began calling at Shoreham in the same year.

The ticket office here was closed in 1992, having been staffed only during part of the day; these days, a PERTIS passenger-operated ticket machine issues 'Permits to Travel' - which are exchanged on-train or at staffed stations for travel tickets - and is located on the Ashford-bound platform. This has since been replaced by a modern ticket machine.

The platforms are connected by a concrete footbridge - a typical product of the Southern Railway concrete factory at Exmouth Junction.

== Facilities ==
There are shelters with benches on both platforms as well as a ticket machine and modern help point. There is step free access to the Sevenoaks bound platform but the London bound platform is only accessible via the stepped footbridge. There is a small (free) car park at the station entrance. The station is unstaffed.

== Services ==
All services at Shoreham are operated by Thameslink using Class 700 EMUs.

The typical off-peak service in trains per hour is:

- 2 tph to London Blackfriars via Catford
- 2 tph to Sevenoaks

During the peak hours, the service to London Blackfriars is extended to and from Welwyn Garden City via Finsbury Park.

Preceding station	National Rail	Following station
Eynsford	Thameslink Darent Valley Line	Otford

== Connections ==
Go-Coach route 2 serves the station.
