= Kemsing railway station =

Railway station in Kent, England

Coordinates: 51.297°N 0.247°E

Kemsing
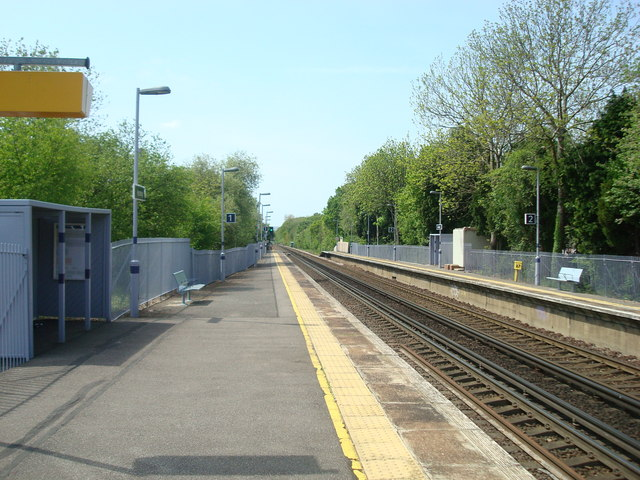

General information
- Location: Kemsing, Sevenoaks; England
- Grid reference: TQ567577
- Manager: Southeastern
- Platforms: 2

Other information
- Station code: KMS
- Classification: DfT category F2

History
- Opened: 1 June 1874
- Original company: London, Chatham and Dover Railway
- Pre-grouping: South Eastern and Chatham Railway
- Post-grouping: Southern Railway

Passengers
- 2021/22: ▲9,478
- 2022/23: ▲12,150
- 2023/24: ▲15,934
- 2024/25: ▲16,834
- 2025/26: ▼15,406
Location
Notes
- Passenger statistics from the Office of Rail and Road

Kemsing railway station serves Kemsing in Kent, England, although the station is located on the other side of the M26 motorway to the village. It is 26 miles 79 chains (43.4 km) down the line from London Victoria. Train services are provided by Southeastern.

== History ==
Kemsing station opened on 1 June 1874, as part of the Maidstone Line from Swanley to Maidstone The goods yard had six sidings, one of which served a goods shed. Freight facilities were withdrawn on 31 October 1960. The signal box closed on 30 September 1964.

The station has been unstaffed since 8 February 1985. The station buildings were demolished after the station became unstaffed. A PERTIS 'permit to travel' machine, located outside the station at road level on the 'up' side, suffices.

== Facilities ==
Kemsing station is unstaffed although there is a self-service ticket machine available for ticket purchases. Both platforms have shelters, information screens and modern help points.

There is a small car park at the station entrance and local buses to Sevenoaks stop a short distance away from Kemsing, Noah's Ark.

== Services ==
All services at Kemsing are operated by Southeastern using Class 375 and 377 EMUs.

The typical off-peak service in trains per hour is:

- 1 tph to London Victoria
- 1 tph to Ashford International

There is no Sunday service at Kemsing, although trains do call on bank holidays.

Preceding station	National Rail	Following station
Otford	Southeastern Kent Downs line Monday-Saturday only	Borough Green & Wrotham
	Disused railways	
Sevenoaks (Bat & Ball)	London, Chatham and Dover Railway Maidstone Line	Borough Green & Wrotham
