= West Malling railway station =

Railway station in Kent, England

Coordinates: 51.292°N 0.419°E

West Malling
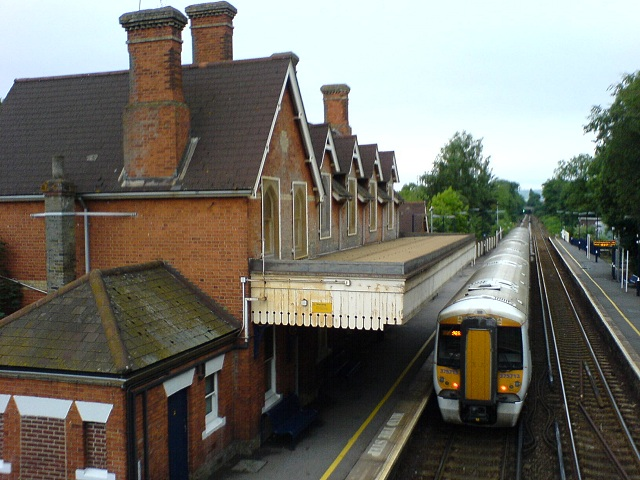

General information
- Location: West Malling, Tonbridge and Malling; England
- Grid reference: TQ687575
- Managed by: Southeastern
- Platforms: 2

Other information
- Station code: WMA
- Classification: DfT category D

Key dates
- 1 June 1874: Opened as Malling
- 23 May 1949: Renamed West Malling

Passengers
- 2020/21: ▼0.143 million
- 2021/22: ▲0.459 million
- 2022/23: ▲0.606 million
- 2023/24: ▲0.784 million
- 2024/25: ▲0.897 million
Location
Notes
- Passenger statistics from the Office of Rail and Road

West Malling railway station (sometimes shown as West Malling for Kings Hill) lies to the east of West Malling, Kent, England; it is close to Kings Hill, Larkfield and Leybourne. The station is 34 miles 61 chains (55.9 km) from London Victoria on the Kent Downs line.

The station, and all trains serving it, is operated by Southeastern.

== History ==
Malling station opened on 1 June 1874, as part of the Maidstone Line from Swanley to Maidstone. It was renamed West Malling on 23 May 1949. The goods yard had four sidings, one of which served a goods shed. Freight facilities were withdrawn on 19 May 1964. The signal box closed on 9 December 1983.

== Facilities ==
The ticket office at the station is staffed for most of the day, with self-service ticket machines on both platforms. There is a 164-space car park for rail users, with 64 bicycle stands.

Nu-Venture bus route 151 provides a regular link to/from Kings Hill.

== Services ==
All services at West Malling are operated by Southeastern, using Class 375 and 377 electric multiple units.

The typical off-peak service in trains per hour is:

- 1 tph to London Victoria
- 1 tph to London Charing Cross
- 1 tph to Maidstone East (non-stop)
- 1 tph to Ashford International (all stations)

During peak hours, the station is served by an additional hourly service between London Victoria and Ashford International.

On Sundays, services between London Charing Cross and Maidstone East do not run.

Preceding station	National Rail	Following station
Borough Green & Wrotham	Southeastern Kent Downs line	East Malling or Maidstone East
