= Bat & Ball railway station =

Railway station in Kent, England

Bat & Ball
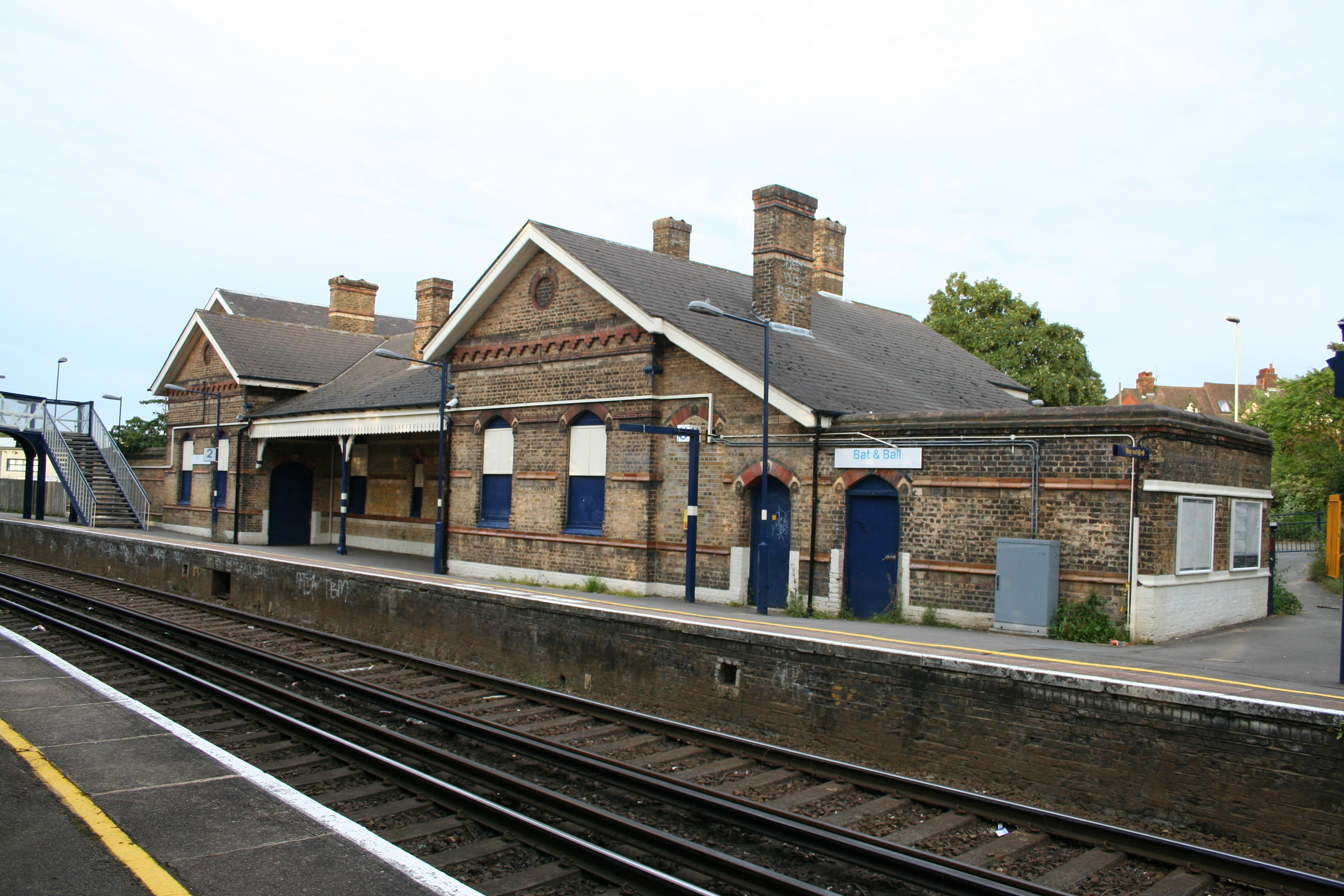

General information
- Location: Sevenoaks, District of Sevenoaks; England
- Coordinates: 51.290°N 0.194°E
- Grid reference: TQ530568
- Manager: Southeastern
- Platforms: 2

Other information
- Station code: BBL
- Classification: DfT category F2

History
- Original company: London, Chatham and Dover Railway
- Pre-grouping: SE&CRCJMC
- Post-grouping: Southern Railway

Key dates
- 2 June 1862: Opened as Sevenoaks
- 1 August 1869: Renamed Sevenoaks Bat & Ball
- 1 January 1917: Closed
- 1 March 1919: Reopened
- 5 June 1950: Renamed Bat & Ball

Passengers
- 2020/21: ▼51,838
- 2021/22: ▲0.134 million
- 2022/23: ▲0.171 million
- 2023/24: ▲0.206 million
- 2024/25: ▲0.218 million
Location
Notes
- Passenger statistics from the Office of Rail and Road

Bat & Ball railway station is on Bat & Ball Road in the suburban town of Sevenoaks, Kent, England. The station is managed by Southeastern, although all trains that serve the station are Thameslink. It is 25 miles 51 chains (41.3 km) from London Victoria, although all northbound trains run to London Blackfriars.

== History ==
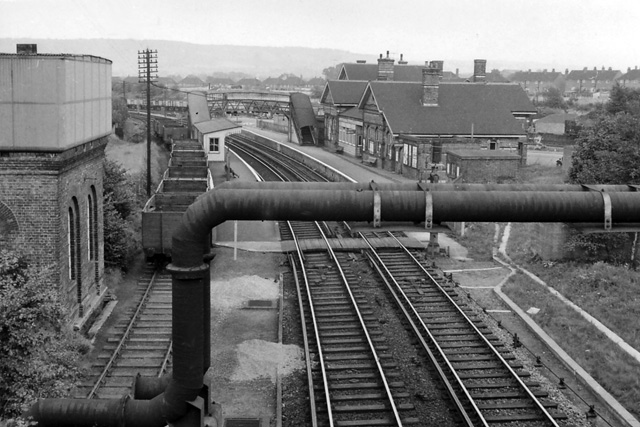
The station in 1962

The station opened in 1862 with the name Sevenoaks. Some years later, it was named Sevenoaks Bat & Ball and then again in 1950 to its current name. The name derives from the Bat & Ball Inn, a pub which no longer exists.

A long lease of the building was granted to Sevenoaks Town Council in 2017 for refurbishment supported by the Heritage Lottery Fund. Works began in March 2018 for a building reopening in January 2019. It is a listed building in the initial, mainstream category, Grade II (two).

== Facilities ==
The station is near the hospital, in the ecclesiastical parish of St John's Hill and in the broader town council's civil parish. It is on a south coastbound route from London via Swanley and via Otford. The northbound platform has a bench under a shelter and, in 2014, new benches and service tannoy have graced the other platform. Southeastern has fitted an electronic screen showing departures.

The station has a car park. Once free, a fee of £3 per day to park began in 2020. This resulted in the displacement of parking by commuters into surrounding residential streets, particularly Chatham Hill Road. Per the local press, parking problems for local residents were common, whilst leaving the station's car park almost deserted.

A PERTIS permit to travel machine was at the entrance to the southbound platform, later replaced by a card payment-only ticket machine in 2016.

As part of the refurbishment project undertaken by Sevenoaks Town Council, the station building will house a public cafe, public toilets and community meeting rooms, due to open January 2019.

== Services ==
All services at Bat & Ball are operated by Thameslink using Class 700 EMUs.

The typical off-peak service in trains per hour is:

- 2 tph to London Blackfriars via Catford
- 2 tph to Sevenoaks

During the peak hours, the service to London Blackfriars is extended to and from Welwyn Garden City via Finsbury Park.

Preceding station	National Rail	Following station
Otford	Thameslink Darent Valley Line	Sevenoaks
	Disused railways	
Terminus	London, Chatham and Dover Railway Maidstone Line	Otford Junction
Terminus	London, Chatham and Dover Railway Maidstone Line	Kemsing
