= Borough Green & Wrotham railway station =

Railway station in Kent, England

Coordinates: 51.29300°N 0.30564°E

Borough Green & Wrotham
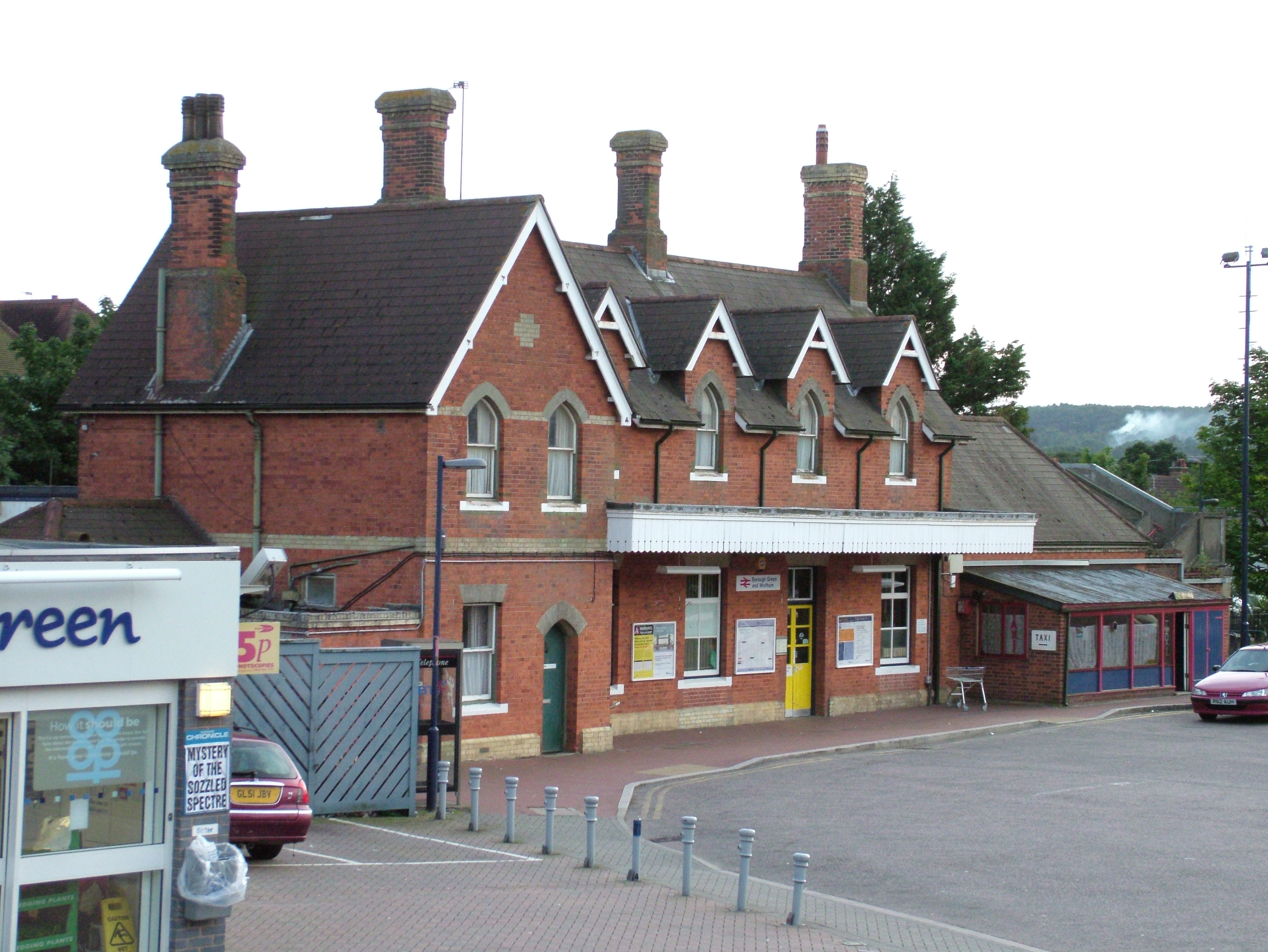

General information
- Location: Borough Green, Tonbridge and Malling; England
- Grid reference: TQ608574
- Manager: Southeastern
- Platforms: 2

Other information
- Station code: BRG
- Classification: DfT category D

Key dates
- 1 June 1874: opened as Wrotham
- 18 June 1962: renamed Borough Green & Wrotham

Passengers
- 2020/21: ▼78,272
- 2021/22: ▲0.269 million
- 2022/23: ▲0.307 million
- 2023/24: ▲0.391 million
- 2024/25: ▲0.438 million
Location
Notes
- Passenger statistics from the Office of Rail and Road

Borough Green & Wrotham railway station (also known as Borough Green) is located in Borough Green in Kent, England. It is 29 miles 46 chains (47.6 km) down the line from London Victoria. Train services are provided by Southeastern.

== History ==
Wrotham station opened on 1 June 1874, as part of the Maidstone Line from Swanley to Maidstone. The station was initially named after Wrotham, which lies 1 mile (1.6 km) to the north. The station was later renamed Wrotham & Borough Green, and then Borough Green & Wrotham as Borough Green grew in size relative to Wrotham. The goods yard had three sidings. One of them served a goods shed, another extended northwards to serve a Ragstone quarry. A 5-ton capacity crane was provided. Freight facilities were withdrawn on 9 September 1968. East of the station, there was a private siding at Platt, and a public siding at Offham. This closed on 6 September 1961.

In Spring 2008, the concrete footbridge spanning the tracks to link the platforms was condemned and replaced by a new bridge immediately to the west.

The ticket office in the 'down side' station building is staffed for part of the day. At other times, a passenger-operated ticket machine, installed in the mid-2000s at the station entrance, suffices.

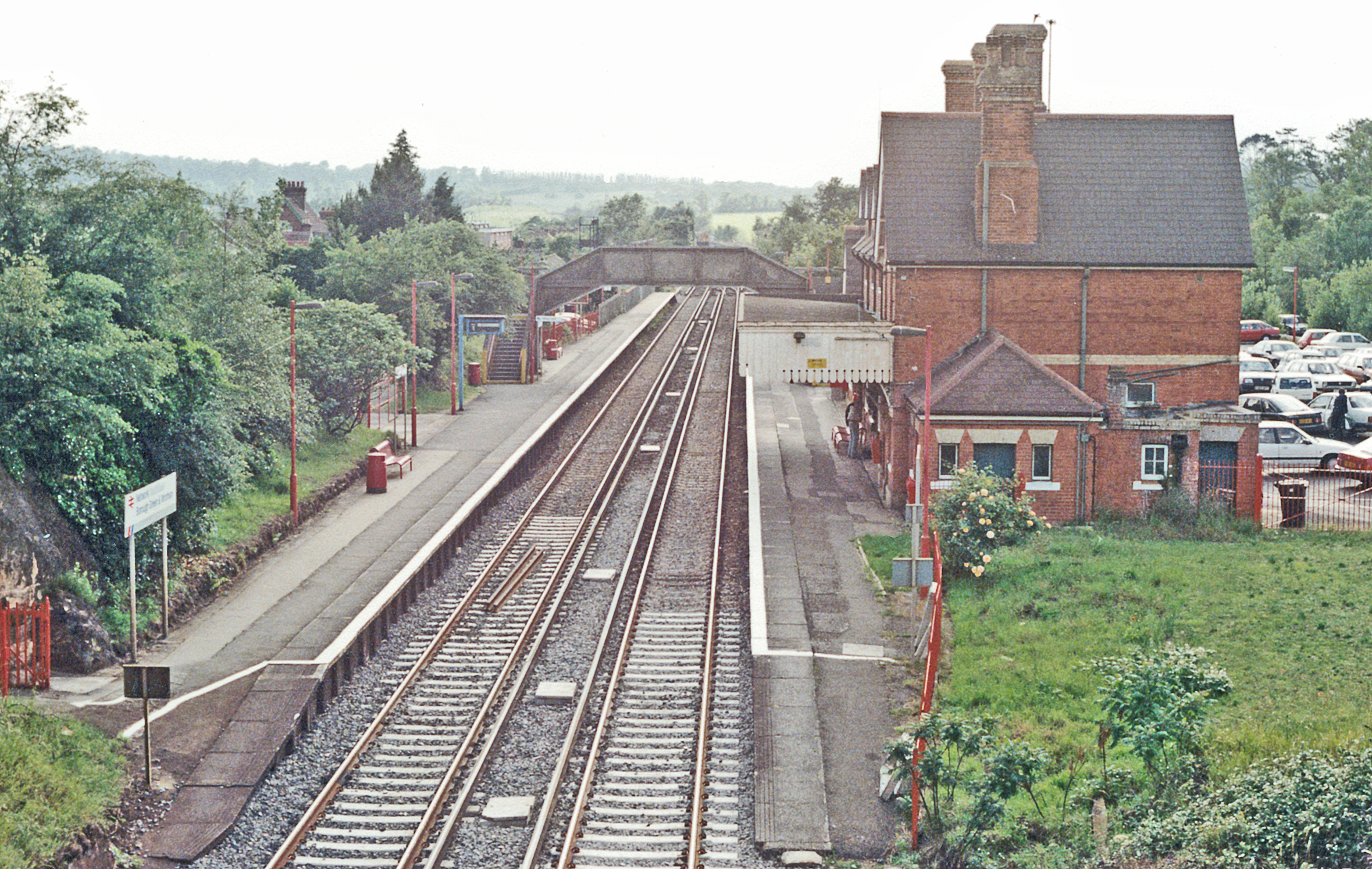
View of the platforms

== Services ==
All services at Borough Green & Wrotham are operated by Southeastern using Class 375 and 377 EMUs.

The typical off-peak service in trains per hour is:

- 1 tph to London Victoria
- 1 tph to London Charing Cross
- 1 tph to Maidstone East (calls at West Malling only)
- 1 tph to Ashford International (all stations)

During the peak hours, the station is served by an additional hourly service between London Victoria and Ashford International.

On Sundays, the services between London Charing Cross and Maidstone East do not run.

Preceding station	National Rail	Following station
Kemsing or Otford	Southeastern Kent Downs line	West Malling
