= Hollingbourne railway station =

Railway station in Kent, England

Coordinates: 51.265°N 0.628°E

Hollingbourne
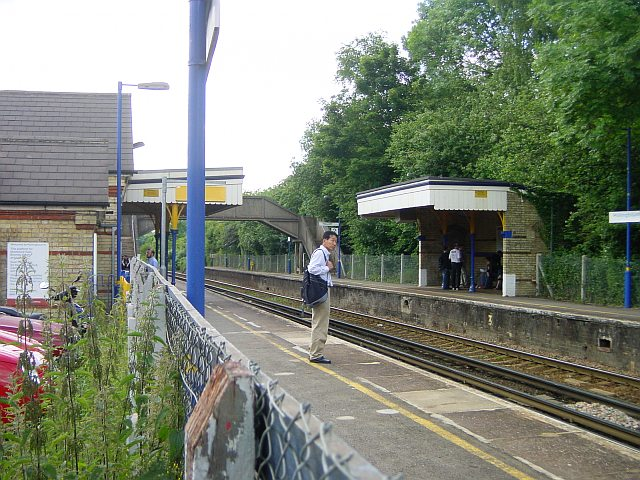

General information
- Location: Hollingbourne, Maidstone; England
- Grid reference: TQ834550
- Managed by: Southeastern
- Platforms: 2

Other information
- Station code: HBN
- Classification: DfT category F2

History
- Opened: 1 July 1884

Passengers
- 2020/21: ▼19,746
- 2021/22: ▲44,650
- 2022/23: ▲46,482
- 2023/24: ▲57,744
- 2024/25: ▲62,252
Location
Notes
- Passenger statistics from the Office of Rail and Road

Hollingbourne railway station serves Hollingbourne in Kent, England. It was opened in 1884 and is 45 miles 2 chains (72.5 km) down the line from London Victoria.

The station, and all trains serving it, is operated by Southeastern.

== History ==
Hollingbourne station opened on 1 July 1884 as part of the London, Chatham and Dover Railway's extension of the line from Maidstone to Ashford West. The goods yard was on the up side. It comprises five sidings, one of which served a goods shed and another served a cattle dock. Freight facilities were withdrawn on 15 May 1961. The signal box closed on 14 April 1984.

The station is unstaffed, the main building however contains a small café.

A self-service ticket machine is located on the up platform. (Platform 1)

== Services ==
Most services at Hollingbourne are operated by Southeastern using Class 375 and 377 EMUs.

The typical off-peak service in trains per hour is:

- 1 tph to London Victoria via Maidstone East
- 1 tph to Ashford International

Additional services, including trains to and from London Charing Cross call at the station during the peak hours.

Preceding station	National Rail	Following station
Bearsted	Southeastern Kent Downs line	Harrietsham

== See also ==
- Hollingbourne Rural District
- Hollingbourne Downs
- Mills on Hollingbourne Stream
