= Barming railway station =

Railway station in Kent, England

Barming
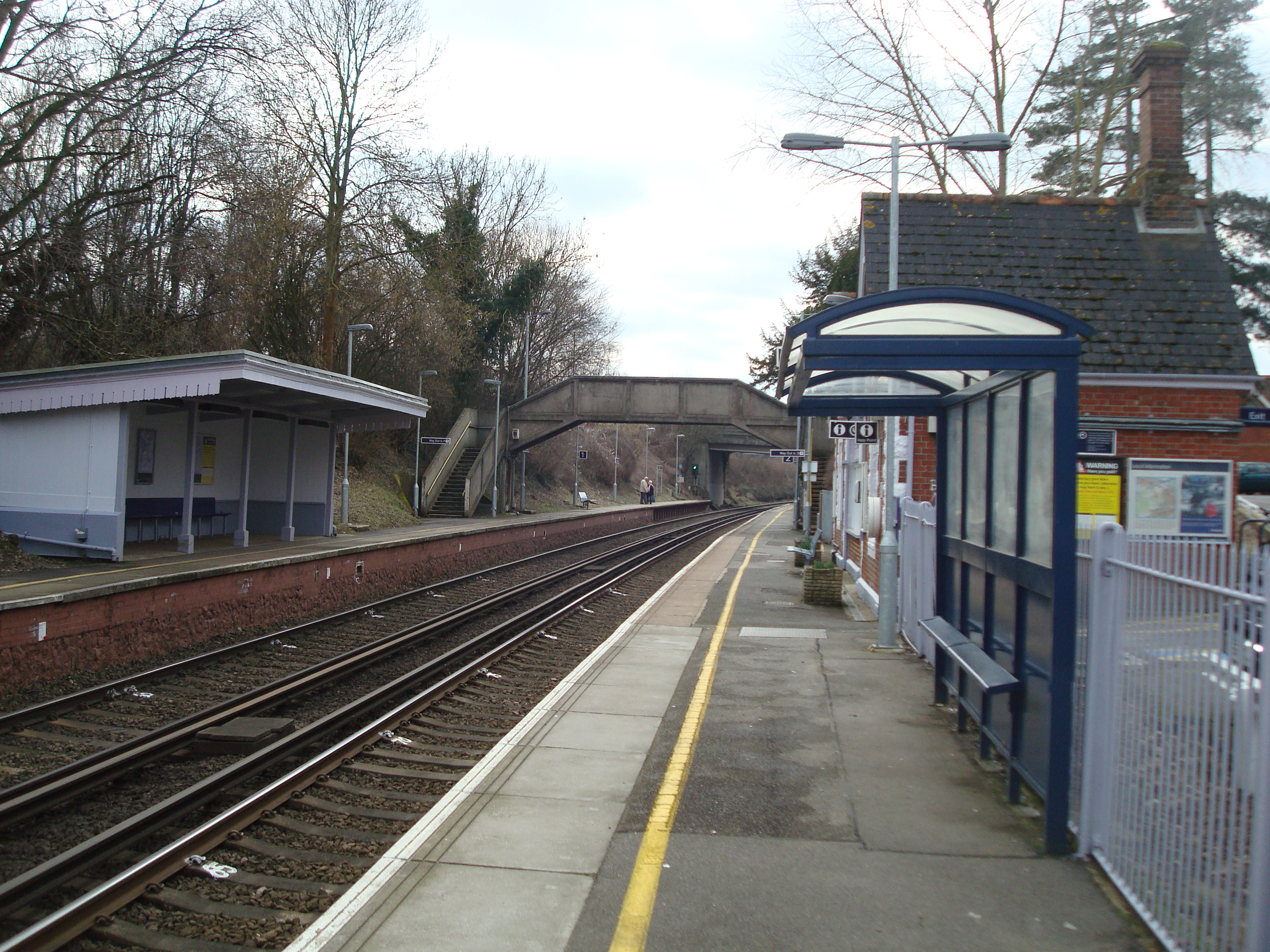

General information
- Location: Aylesford, Tonbridge and Malling, Kent; England
- Coordinates: 51°17′4.84″N 0°28′44.08″E
- Grid reference: TQ729568
- Elevation: 49 m (161 ft)
- Owner: Network Rail
- Operator: Southeastern
- Line: Maidstone East Line
- Distance: 37m 43ch from Victoria
- Platforms: 2
- Tracks: 2
- Bus routes: 58, 558, 575
- Bus operators: Arriva Southern Counties, Nu-Venture

Construction
- Platform levels: 1
- Parking: 80
- Cycle facilities: 16 parking spaces
- Accessible: Yes, to platform 2 (Ashford-bound) only

Other information
- Status: In use
- Station code: BMG
- Classification: DfT category E
- Website: https://www.southeasternrailway.co.uk/travel-information/more-travel-help/station-information/stations/barming

History
- Opened: 1 June 1874
- Electrified: 1931
- Original company: London, Chatham and Dover Railway
- Pre-grouping: South Eastern Railway
- Post-grouping: Southern Railway

Passengers
- 2020/21: ▼42,146
- 2021/22: ▲0.160 million
- 2022/23: ▲0.205 million
- 2023/24: ▲0.252 million
- 2024/25: ▼0.237 million
Location
Notes
- Passenger statistics from the Office of Rail and Road

Barming railway station is located in Tonbridge and Malling Borough, west of Maidstone, in Kent, England; it is approximately 1 mile (1.6 km) from Barming and Maidstone Hospital. It is 37 miles 43 chains (60.4 km) down the line from London Victoria on the Kent Downs line. The station and all trains serving it are operated by Southeastern.

== History ==
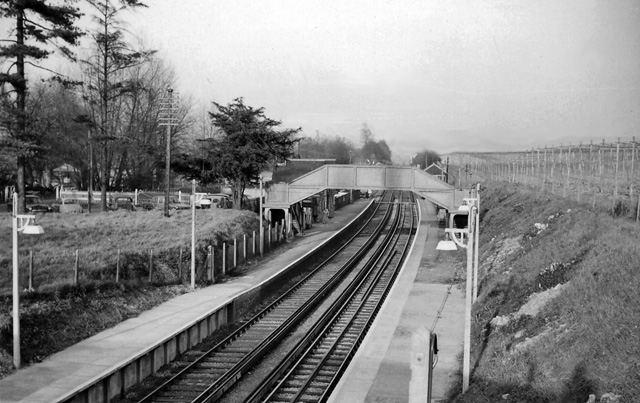
The station in 1961

Barming station opened on 1 June 1874, as part of the London, Chatham and Dover Railway's Maidstone line from Swanley Junction to Maidstone. The goods yard had two sidings, one of which served a goods shed. Freight facilities were withdrawn on 5 December 1960. The signal box closed on 24 April 1982.

The concrete footbridge which spanned the tracks at the western end of the station, linking the platforms, was life-expired and demolished in early 2013. It was an example of the standard pre-fabricated design built at the Southern Railway's concrete factory at Exmouth Junction, east of Exeter. The replacement footbridge to the standard Network Rail design is at the extreme eastern end of the station.

== Facilities ==
The ticket office is staffed for limited hours during the morning peak period on Mondays to Fridays; at other times, a ticket vending machine on the down platform can be used. A passenger information screen is located on platform 2 and provides information relating to train running times for both platforms. There is a chargeable car park, with 80 spaces at its entrance, with a small 16-space cycle rack at the station entrance.

The station has step-free access available to the Ashford-bound platform, although the London-bound platform is only reachable by the use of steps.

The platforms are of six-car length only, despite the majority of services throughout the day being formed of eight cars. The original station building remains on the down platform 2, with a substantial wooden shelter on the up platform.

== Services ==
All services at Barming are operated by Southeastern, using Class 375 and 377 electric multiple units.

The typical off-peak service in trains per hour is:

- 1 tph to London Victoria
- 1 tph to Ashford International

During peak hours, the station is served by an additional hourly service between London Victoria and Ashford International, increasing the service to 2 tph in each direction.

Preceding station	National Rail	Following station
East Malling	Southeastern Kent Downs line	Maidstone East
