= Bearsted railway station =

Railway station in England

Coordinates: 51.276°N 0.578°E

Bearsted
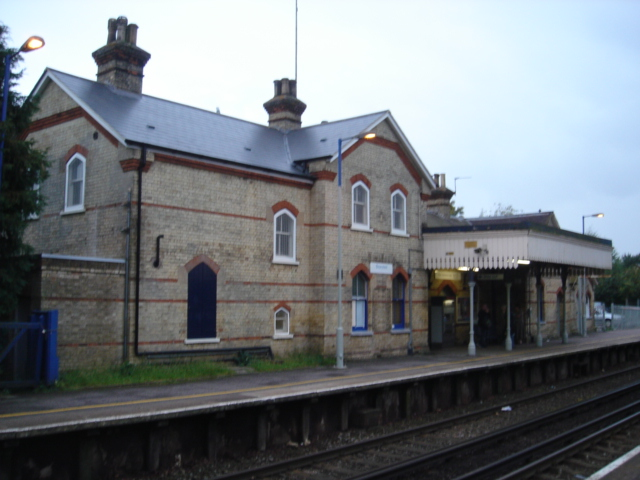

General information
- Location: Bearsted, Maidstone (borough); England
- Grid reference: TQ798561
- Manager: Southeastern
- Platforms: 2

Other information
- Station code: BSD
- Classification: DfT category D

Key dates
- 1 July 1884: Opened as Bearsted
- 1 July 1907: Renamed Bearsted & Thurnham
- 12 May 1980: Renamed Bearsted

Passengers
- 2020/21: ▼76,660
- 2021/22: ▲0.203 million
- 2022/23: ▲0.262 million
- 2023/24: ▲0.290 million
- 2024/25: ▲0.317 million
Location
Notes
- Passenger statistics from the Office of Rail and Road

Bearsted railway station serves Bearsted in Kent, England. The station and all trains serving it are operated by Southeastern. It is 42 miles 59 chains (68.8 km) down the line from London Victoria via Herne Hill.

Inside the station building are staffed and self-service ticket sales and a café. A new footbridge was built on the opposite side of the station from the original in 2011.

== History ==
Bearsted station opened on 1 July 1884 as part of the London, Chatham and Dover Railway's extension of the line from Maidstone to Ashford West. The goods yard was on the up side. It comprised three sidings, one of which served a goods shed. A 30 cwt-capacity crane was provided. Freight facilities were withdrawn on 7 October 1968. The signal box closed on 14 April 1984. A refuge siding was located on the down side.

== Services ==
All services at Bearsted are operated by Southeastern using Class 375 and 377 EMUs.

The typical off-peak service in trains per hour is:

- 1 tph to London Victoria via Maidstone East
- 1 tph to Ashford International

Additional services, including trains to and from London Charing Cross call at the station during the peak hours.

Preceding station	National Rail	Following station
Maidstone East	Southeastern Kent Downs line	Hollingbourne
