= Eynsford railway station =

Railway station in Kent, England

Coordinates: 51.363°N 0.204°E

Eynsford
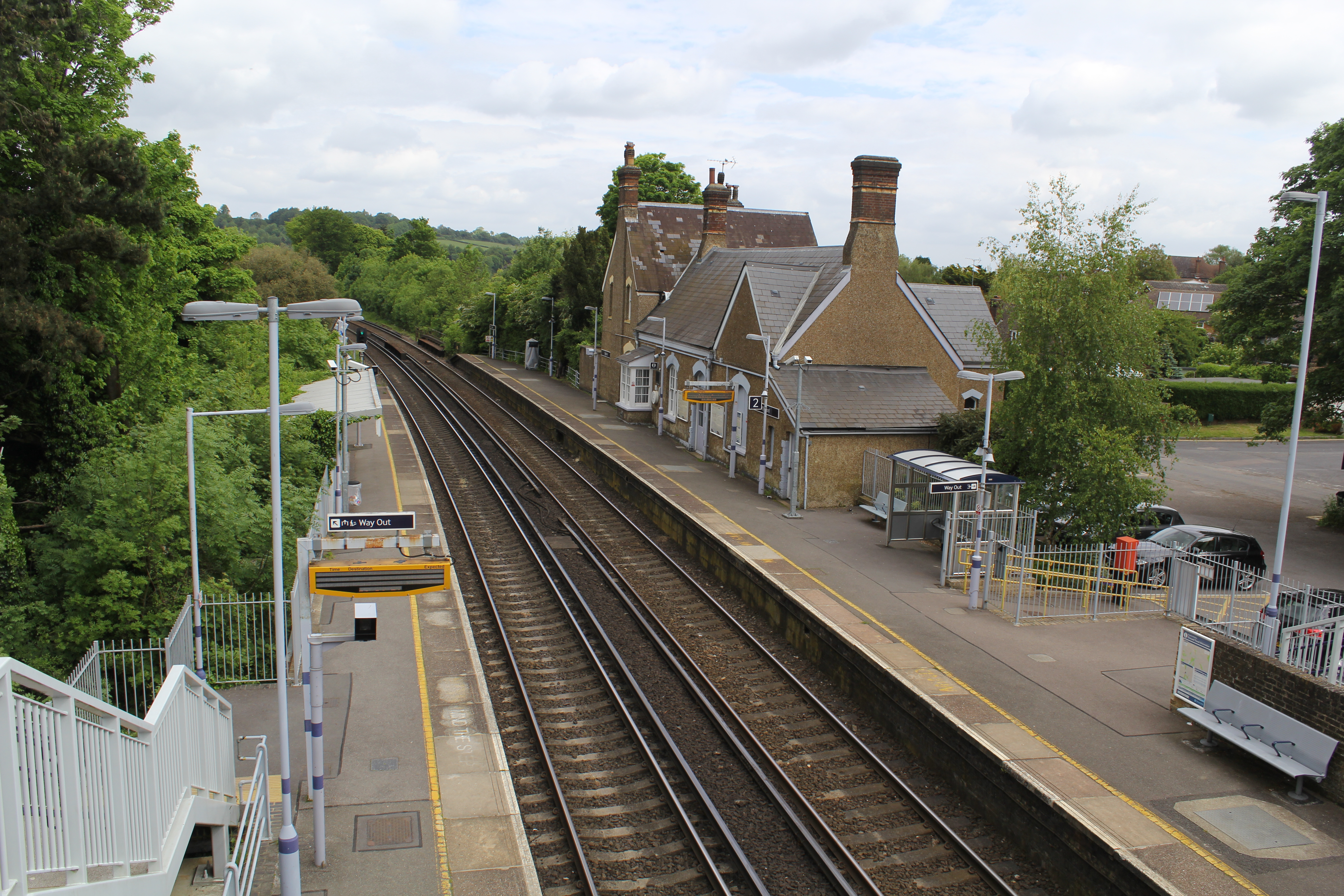

General information
- Location: Eynsford, District of Sevenoaks; England
- Grid reference: TQ535649
- Managed by: Southeastern
- Platforms: 2

Other information
- Station code: EYN
- Classification: DfT category E

Key dates
- 1 July 1862: Opened
- 6 January 1935: Electrified
- May 1962: Closed (Goods)

Passengers
- 2020/21: ▼45,564
- 2021/22: ▲0.105 million
- 2022/23: ▲0.124 million
- 2023/24: ▲0.143 million
- 2024/25: ▲0.156 million
Location
Notes
- Passenger statistics from the Office of Rail and Road

Eynsford railway station serves Eynsford in Kent, England. It is 20 miles 32 chains (32.8 km) down the line from London Victoria and is situated between Swanley and Shoreham. Train services are provided by Thameslink.

== History ==
The Swanley to Sevenoaks Bat & Ball line was opened on 2 June 1862, by the London, Chatham and Dover Railway, initially with just a single track. The station at Eynsford came into use the following month, with two platforms and a passing loop; the second track came in 1863.

The main station building is on the "down" side, two storeys high, with chimney stacks and arched window frames. On the "up" side is a shelter with an elaborate valance and sides for protection from the weather. The track was crossed at ground level until a lattice footbridge was built in about 1910. The signal cabin was positioned at the southern end of the "up" platform.

Eynsford's goods yard was positioned on the "down" side, to the south of the main building, and comprised a pair of sidings, one of which passed over a wagon turntable through the pitched-roof goods shed. The platforms were extended twice, first in 1894 and again in 1932 when they were lengthened at their southern ends, requiring the demolition of the signal box. This was replaced by a porch on the ground floor of the station building's platform side.

Electric services between Bickley and Sevenoaks were introduced on 6 January 1935, when the station lost its lattice footbridge to a prefabricated concrete replacement. Goods traffic ceased in May 1962 and the goods shed was demolished soon after.

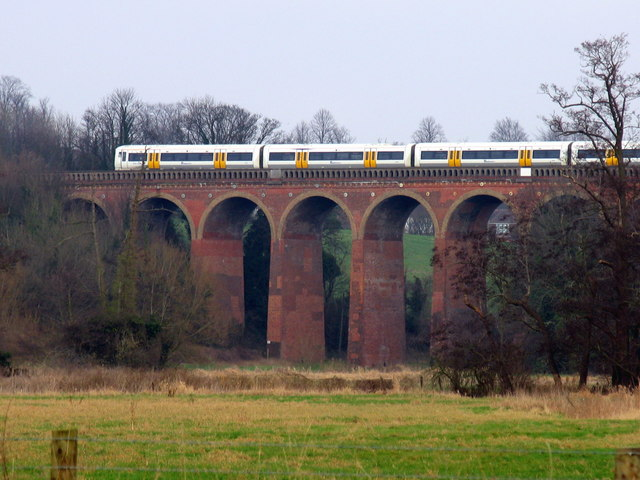
Lullingstone Viaduct

Approximately 1 km (0.6 mi) to the north west lie the remains of Lullingstone, built but never opened, as the development it was intended to serve never materialised. All that remains are the platforms (still in situ) and the platform canopies which were reinstalled at Canterbury East station. Between the two, the line is taken over the River Darent by an impressive nine-arch red-brick viaduct.

== Facilities ==
The station has a ticket office which is located in the substantial station building on the Ashford bound platform. This is open during the morning Monday-Friday only (06:10-12:50). At other times, the station is unstaffed and tickets must be purchased from the self-service ticket machine at the station entrance.

The station has covered seating areas as well as modern help points located on each of its platforms which are connected by a concrete footbridge.

There is also a small (free) car park and cycle rack at the entrance to the station.

The station has step-free access available to the Ashford bound platform although the London bound platform is only reachable by the stepped footbridge so is not accessible.

== Services ==
All services at Eynsford are operated by Thameslink using Class 700 EMUs.

The typical off-peak service in trains per hour is:

- 2 tph to London Blackfriars via Catford
- 2 tph to Sevenoaks

During the peak hours, the service to London Blackfriars is extended to and from Welwyn Garden City via Finsbury Park.

Preceding station	National Rail	Following station
Swanley	Thameslink Darent Valley Line	Shoreham
	Historical railways	
Lullingstone Line open, station closed	Southern Railway Maidstone Line	Shoreham Line and station open

== Connections ==
Go-Coach route 2 serves the station.
