= Otford railway station =

Railway station in Kent, England

Coordinates: 51.313°N 0.197°E

Otford
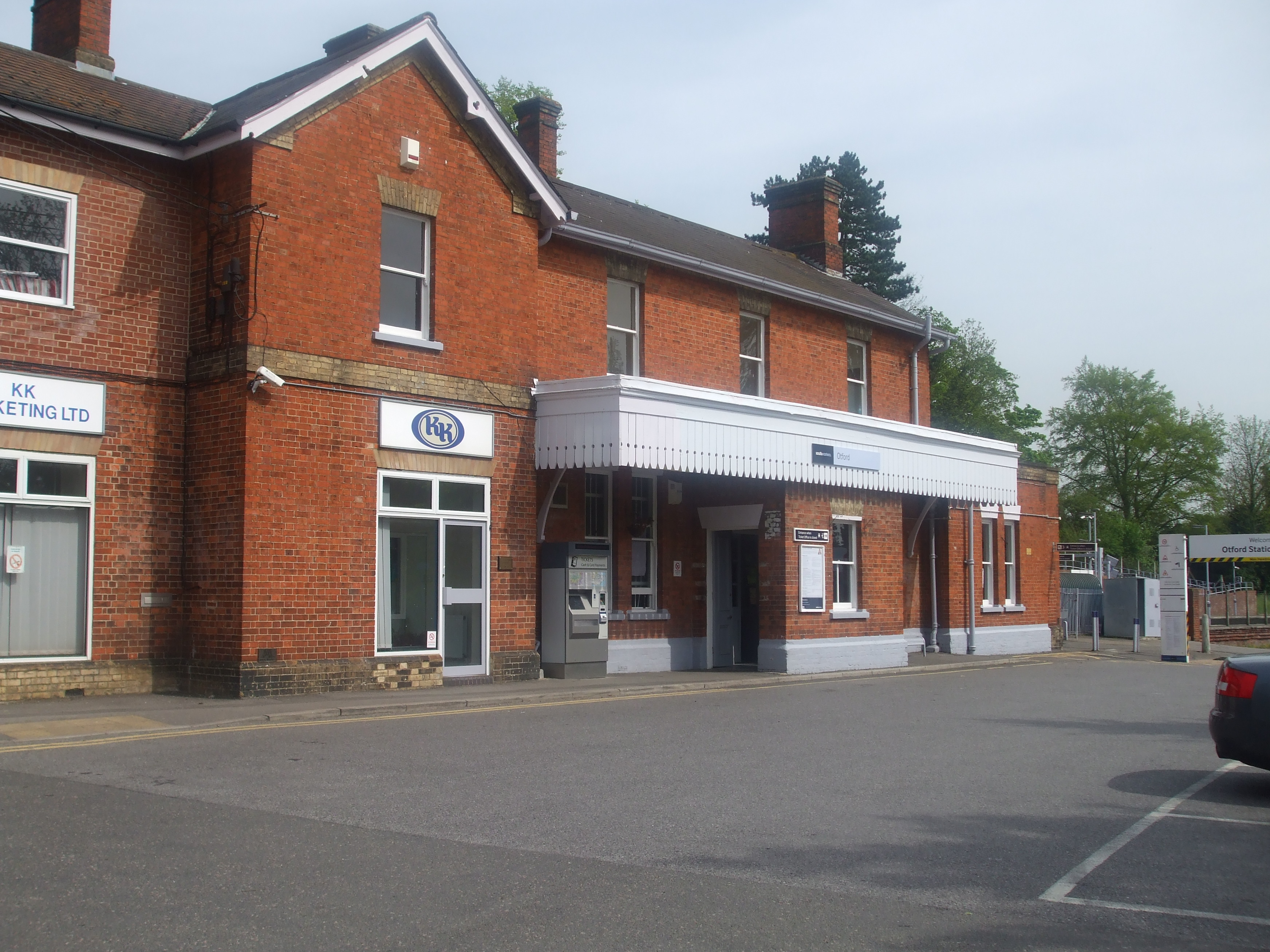

General information
- Location: Otford, District of Sevenoaks; England
- Grid reference: TQ532593
- Manager: Southeastern
- Platforms: 2

Other information
- Station code: OTF
- Classification: DfT category D

History
- Original company: London, Chatham and Dover Railway
- Pre-grouping: South Eastern and Chatham Railway
- Post-grouping: Southern Railway

Key dates
- 1 June 1874: Otford Junction opened
- 1 November 1880: Otford Junction closed
- 1 August 1882: Otford opened
- 1904: Renamed Otford Junction
- 7 July 1929: Renamed Otford

Passengers
- 2020/21: ▼97,292
- Interchange: ▼7,457
- 2021/22: ▲0.267 million
- Interchange: ▲18,998
- 2022/23: ▲0.326 million
- Interchange: ▲25,191
- 2023/24: ▲0.401 million
- Interchange: ▲37,474
- 2024/25: ▲0.446 million
- Interchange: ▲48,704
Location
Notes
- Passenger statistics from the Office of Rail and Road

Otford railway station serves Otford in Kent. It is 24 miles 6 chains (38.7 km) down the line from London Victoria. Train services are provided by Southeastern and Thameslink.

== History ==
The first station at Otford opened on 1 June 1874. It was located at the point where the lines to Bat & Ball and Maidstone diverge (TQ534584). It was purely an exchange station, with no access for the villagers of Otford. The station closed on 1 November 1880. The current Otford station opened on 1 August 1882. It was renamed Otford Junction in 1904, reverting to its original name on 7 July 1929. The station had two through platforms and a bay platform, which was used by shuttle trains to Sevenoaks (Tubs Hill). The yard had two sidings, one of which served a goods shed. Freight facilities were withdrawn on 7 May 1962.

== Services ==
Services at Otford are operated by Thameslink and Southeastern using Class 375, 377 and 700 EMUs.

The typical off-peak service in trains per hour is:

- 1 tph to London Victoria
- 1 tph to London Charing Cross
- 2 tph to London Blackfriars via Catford
- 2 tph to Sevenoaks
- 1 tph to Maidstone East (semi-fast)
- 1 tph to Ashford International (all stations)

Additional services call at the station during the peak hours. In addition, the service to London Blackfriars is extended to and from Welwyn Garden City via Finsbury Park.

On Sundays, the services between London Charing Cross and Maidstone East do not run.

Preceding station	National Rail	Following station
Shoreham	Thameslink Darent Valley Line	Bat & Ball
Swanley	Southeastern Kent Downs line	Kemsing or Borough Green & Wrotham

== Gallery ==
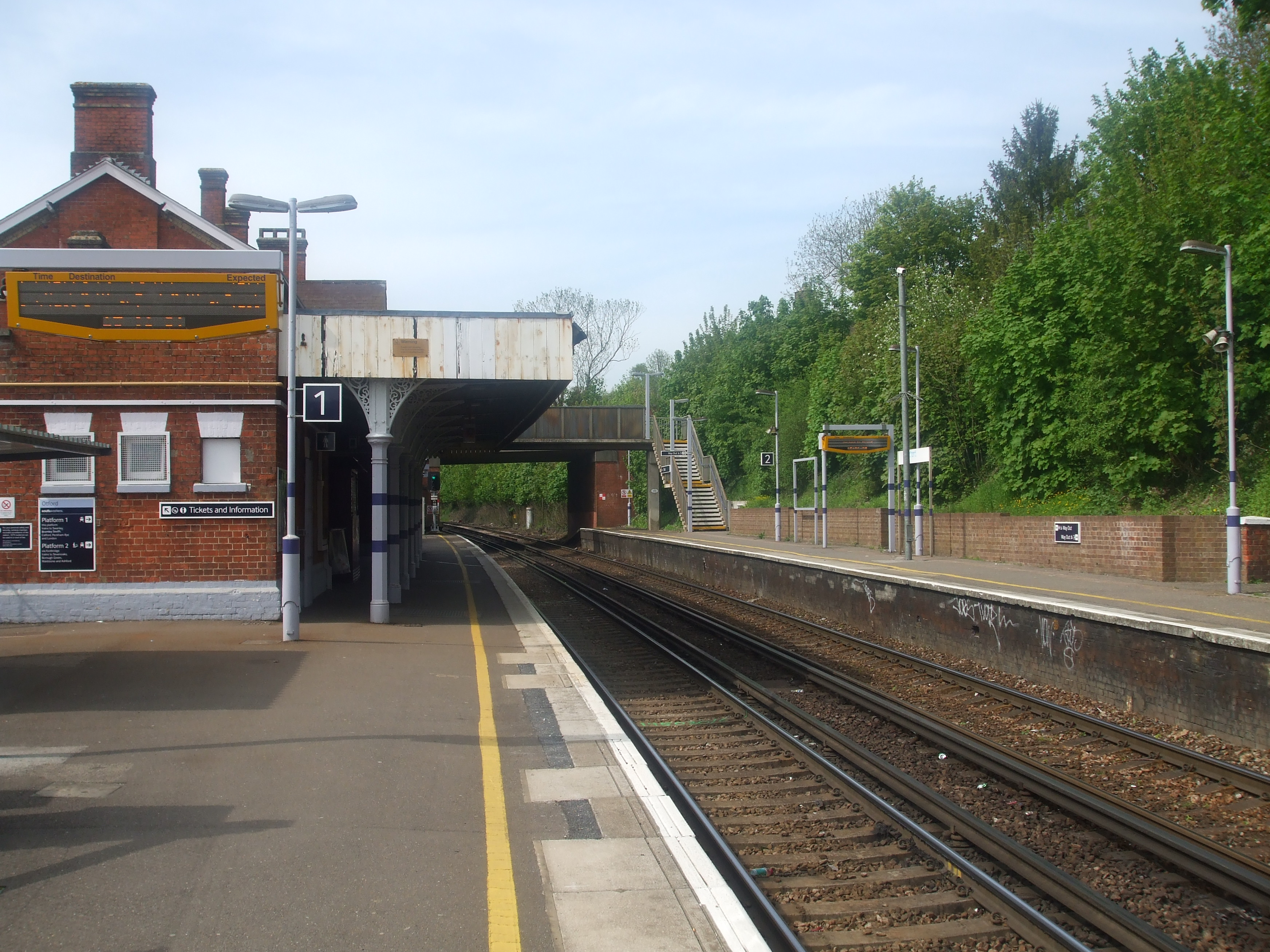
Station platforms
