= Hildenborough railway station =

Railway station in Kent, England

Hildenborough
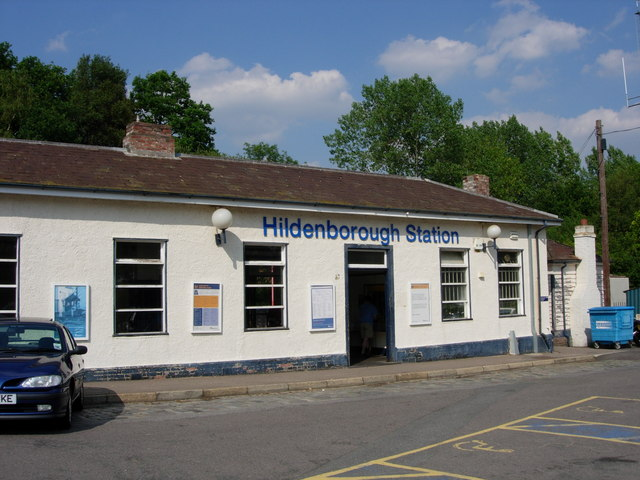
- The station building in 2006

General information
- Location: Hildenborough, Borough of Tonbridge and Malling; England
- Coordinates: 51.2142°N 0.2277°E
- Grid reference: TQ556485
- Manager: Southeastern
- Platforms: 2

Other information
- Station code: HLB
- Classification: DfT category D

History
- Opened: 1 May 1868

Passengers
- 2020/21: ▼82,818
- 2021/22: ▲0.237 million
- 2022/23: ▲0.294 million
- 2023/24: ▲0.325 million
- 2024/25: ▲0.353 million
Location
Notes
- Passenger statistics from the Office of Rail and Road

Hildenborough railway station is on the South Eastern Main Line in England, serving Hildenborough, Kent, and the surrounding villages. It is 27 miles 2 chains (43.5 km) down the line from London Charing Cross and is situated between Sevenoaks and Tonbridge. Trains calling at the station are operated by Southeastern.

Trains from the station run northbound to Charing Cross via Orpington and southbound to Tunbridge Wells. Trains also run to London Cannon Street and Ashford International during peak times.

== Services ==
All services at Hildenborough are operated by Southeastern using Class 375, 465 and 466 EMUs.

The typical off-peak weekday service in trains per hour is:

- 1 tph to London Charing Cross
- 1 tph to Tunbridge Wells and Hastings

Additional services, including trains to and from London Cannon Street, Ashford International, Dover Priory and Ramsgate call at the station during the peak hours (along with some additional trains between Tunbridge Wells and Charing Cross). Weekend services call once per hour each way (with some additional Saturday services).

Preceding station	National Rail	Following station
Sevenoaks	Southeastern Hastings Line	Tonbridge

== Accidents and incidents ==
- On 6 July 1970, a freight train was derailed at Hildenborough. The line was blocked for three days.

== Connections ==
No regular buses serve the station directly although the Go-Coach routes 5 and 401 and Arriva Southern Counties route 402 stop on London Road, approximately 15 minutes walking distance from the station.
