= Permit to travel =

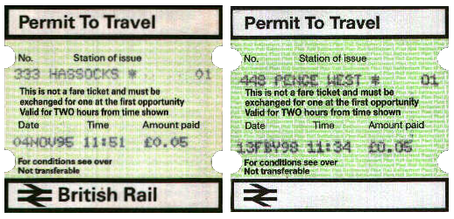
Permits to Travel from the pre-privatisation (left) and post-privatisation era, showing station name, machine number, date, time and amount paid.

In the ticketing system of the British rail network, a Permit to Travel provisionally allows passengers to travel on a train when they have not purchased a ticket in advance and the ticket office of the station they are travelling from is closed, without incurring a penalty fare.

Because some rail passengers may travel without having their tickets checked at any point of their journey, particularly at off-peak times when stations are less likely to be staffed, the obligation to possess a Permit to Travel allows the collection of at least some revenue from passengers who would otherwise travel for free. Most train operating companies (TOCs) have altered their penalty fare policies and have removed many Permit to Travel machines. At larger stations, these stations have also in recent years given way to more sophisticated self-service ticket machines.

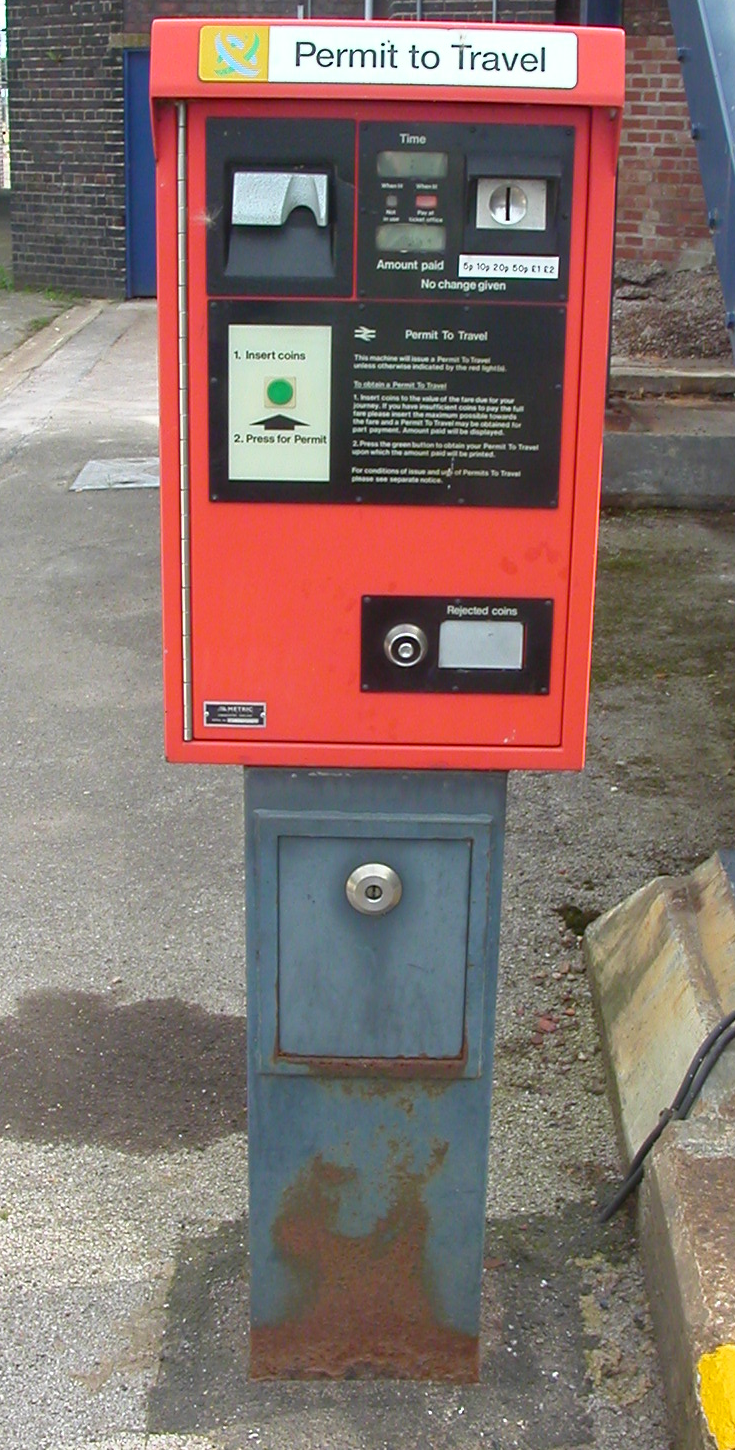
Permit to Travel machine at Lichfield Trent Valley station, with the two LCD panels showing the current time (top) and the amount paid (bottom). Between these are two lights; the smaller light on the left indicates that the machine is out of order, while the other (illuminated in this picture) indicates that the machine has been deactivated because the station's ticket office is open. Photographed on 5 September 2006.

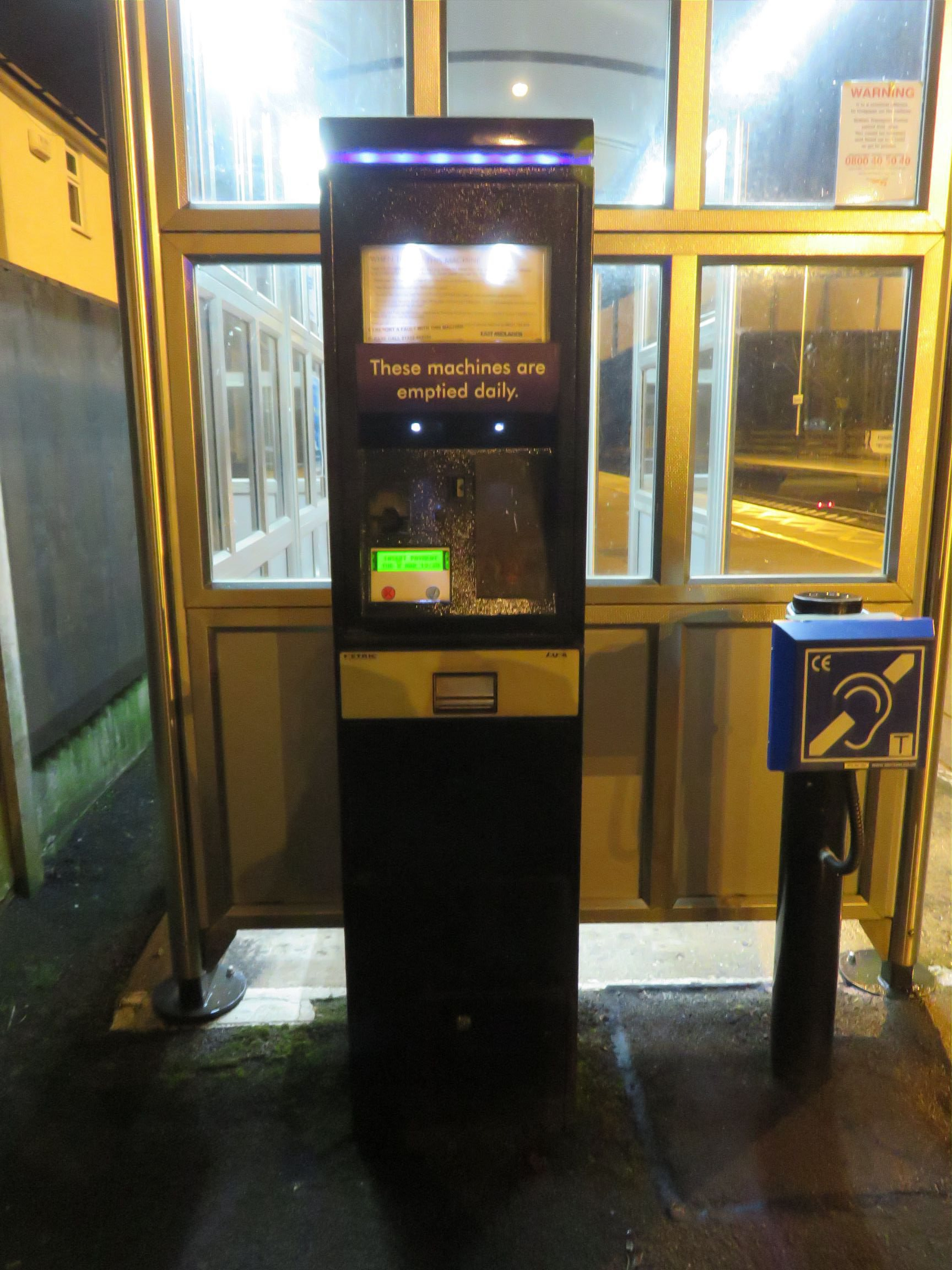
A Metric Aura PERTIS machine at Spondon station, with one LCD panel displaying messages, time and money entered. This machine has two coin reject buttons. Note that this machine has been vandalized as the cover over the interaction area is missing. Photographed on 8 February 2016.

== History ==
The system, known officially as PERTIS (/pɜːrtɪs/; acronym for Permit to Travel Issuing System), was first introduced by Network SouthEast in November 1988 on the London, Tilbury and Southend line between London Fenchurch Street and Shoeburyness. The machines, which closely resemble those found in pay and display car parks, were manufactured by Almex Control Systems. Machines were given the designation AS-9 (wall-mounted) or AS-88 (mounted on a metal base), but internal workings and tickets were identical in each case.

Penalty fare schemes spread across Network SouthEast in subsequent years, with AS-88 machines being used exclusively. Railway stations in the West Midlands and West Yorkshire passenger transport executive areas subsequently had schemes put in place, and machines were installed accordingly.

== Use and operation ==
The front panel of the machine has two LCD displays; one shows the current time, while the other displays the amount paid when coins have been fed in. A button is pressed to print the permit, which shows a serial number, the station name, the date and time. The passenger is supposed to insert coins as near to the value of the fare as possible (if they know the fare and have enough coins). Some machines have a list of common local single and return fares to assist passengers.

Permits bear the warning that they are not fare tickets and must be exchanged for one at the first opportunity. The record of the station of issue means that passengers who travel using it cannot claim that they just boarded the train (allowing them to travel on a cheaper fare) if they are not reached by a ticket inspector until a few stops after boarding. Permits are in any case valid for only two hours from the time shown on them.

If holders of a Permit to Travel are asked to present their ticket by an inspector, they will be asked where they are travelling to and issued with the appropriate ticket and will be charged the difference between the balance already paid, as stated on the permit and the full cost of the ticket for their journey. If they have already paid the full price of the ticket, it will be exchanged for the permit and no money will change hands.

Because any amount of money on a valid Permit to Travel will ensure that a passenger cannot be charged a penalty fare, it is entirely possible (if the passenger is not encountered by an inspector, who will sell a full ticket) to make a two-hour train journey for as little as five pence (the lowest denomination coin the machine will accept) without breaching any fare regulations.

When a station is staffed and its ticket office open, the machine will usually be deactivated, with a light illuminated to indicate that proper tickets should be purchased.

== Locations ==
- Albrighton railway station (in place 2017)
- Angel Road railway station (still working in 2019 when station closed)
- Arundel railway station (In place 2007, removed before 2023)
- Beaulieu Road railway station (Platform 1, working 2017, in place 2023)
- Box Hill & Westhumble railway station (in place 2019)
- Didcot Parkway railway station (in place 2026, no longer operational)
- Canley railway station (2018, not working and since removed)
- Cressing railway station (in place 2025, but no longer operational)
- Eynsford railway station (still in place 2018, since removed)
- Ford railway station (In place 2007, removed after 2022)
- Hartford railway station (since removed)
- Hassocks railway station (closed after Nov 1995)
- Hatton railway station (removed before May 2025)
- Haydons Road railway station (in place 2022, removed before 2026)
- Heald Green Railway Station (unknown, but well before 2026)
- Kings Sutton railway station (removed after 2020)
- Lapworth railway station (2023)
- Lichfield Trent Valley railway station (November 2006)
- Little Kimble railway station (2017, still working, still in place 2021)
- Longcross railway station (working in 2025, in place on platform 2, removed as of 2026)
- Lymington Town railway station (Now removed)
- Minster railway station (before 2008)
- Morden South railway station (in place 2019)
- North Dulwich Station (2025)
- Oakengates railway station (in place 2019)
- Ockendon railway station (in place 2010)
- Penge West railway station (February 1998)
- Saunderton railway station (out of order in 2018)
- Shifnal railway station (in place 2017)
- Small Heath railway station (2019)
- Southend Central railway station, (Now removed)
- Spondon railway station (removed before May 2023)
- Stoke Mandeville railway station (January 2025)
- Styal railway station (unknown, but well before 2026)
- Sutton Common railway station(in place 2019)
- Teynham railway station (In place 2019, removed before 2023)
- Warnham railway station (2017)
- White Notley railway station (2018 not working, removed before 2025)
- Widney Manor railway station (removed between 2019-2022)
- Wrabness railway station (2018)

== Other countries ==
A similar ticket is known in Germany as Fahrkarte Anfangsstrecke. It can be acquired at older Deutsche Bahn ticket machines and is priced at €15.00.
