= Darent Valley line =

Railway line in Kent, England

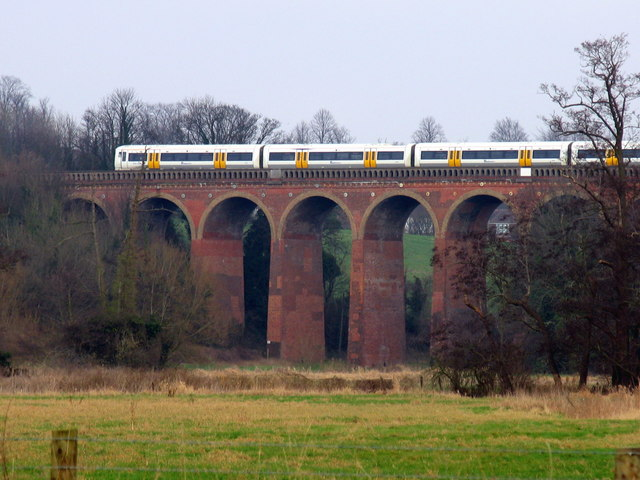
- The line crossing the River Darent at Eynsford Viaduct

Overview
- Status: Operational
- Owner: Network Rail
- Locale: Kent; South East England
- Termini: Swanley; Sevenoaks

Service
- Type: Suburban rail, Heavy rail
- System: National Rail
- Operator(s): Southeastern; Thameslink
- Rolling stock: Class 375 "Electrostar"; Class 377 "Electrostar"; Class 465 "Networker"; Class 466 "Networker"; Class 700 "Desiro City"

Technical
- Line length: 9 mi 24 ch (15.0 km)
- Track gauge: 1,435 mm (4 ft 8 1/2 in) standard gauge
- Electrification: 750 V DC third rail

The Darent Valley line is a railway line between Swanley and Sevenoaks in Kent, England. It adopted its current name in 2020, by the Kent Rail Partnership.

It covers part of what was known as the Maidstone line which continued beyond Otford to Ashford International via Maidstone East. The line diverges from the Chatham Main Line at Swanley Junction and continues to Otford Junction, where it diverges from the Kent Downs line and meets the South Eastern Main Line at Sevenoaks.

== History ==
The line was built by the London, Chatham and Dover Railway from their first line, the Chatham Main Line and was opened on 2 June 1862. The current stations at Eynsford and Otford opened later in July 1862 and August 1882 respectively. An additional station at Lullingstone was proposed to open in 1939 but work on the station was suspended following the outbreak of World War II and the station was never brought into use.

The line was electrified in 1935 (750 V DC third rail) by the Southern Railway prior to World War II.

In 2020, the line was adopted by the Kent Rail Partnership and was renamed the Darent Valley line. The section from Otford from Ashford International was renamed to the Kent Downs line at the same time.

== Infrastructure ==
Traction current is supplied at 750 volts DC via the Third Rail. The supply for this is overseen by Paddock Wood Electrical Control Room. Signalling is Track Circuit Block with multiple aspect colour light signals throughout, controlled by Ashford IECC. The line is double track throughout.

== Services ==
Services on the line are primarily operated by Thameslink. In the off-peak, there are two trains per hour between London Blackfriars and Sevenoaks via Catford which call at all stations. During the peak hours, services are extended beyond London Blackfriars to and from Welwyn Garden City via Finsbury Park. These services are operated using Class 700 EMUs.

Southeastern utilises the route for their semi-fast services between London Victoria, London Charing Cross, Maidstone East and Ashford International. These services run non-stop between Swanley and Otford before diverging down the Kent Downs line.
