= Sevenoaks railway station =

Railway station in Kent, England

Coordinates: 51°16′35″N 0°10′54″E

Sevenoaks
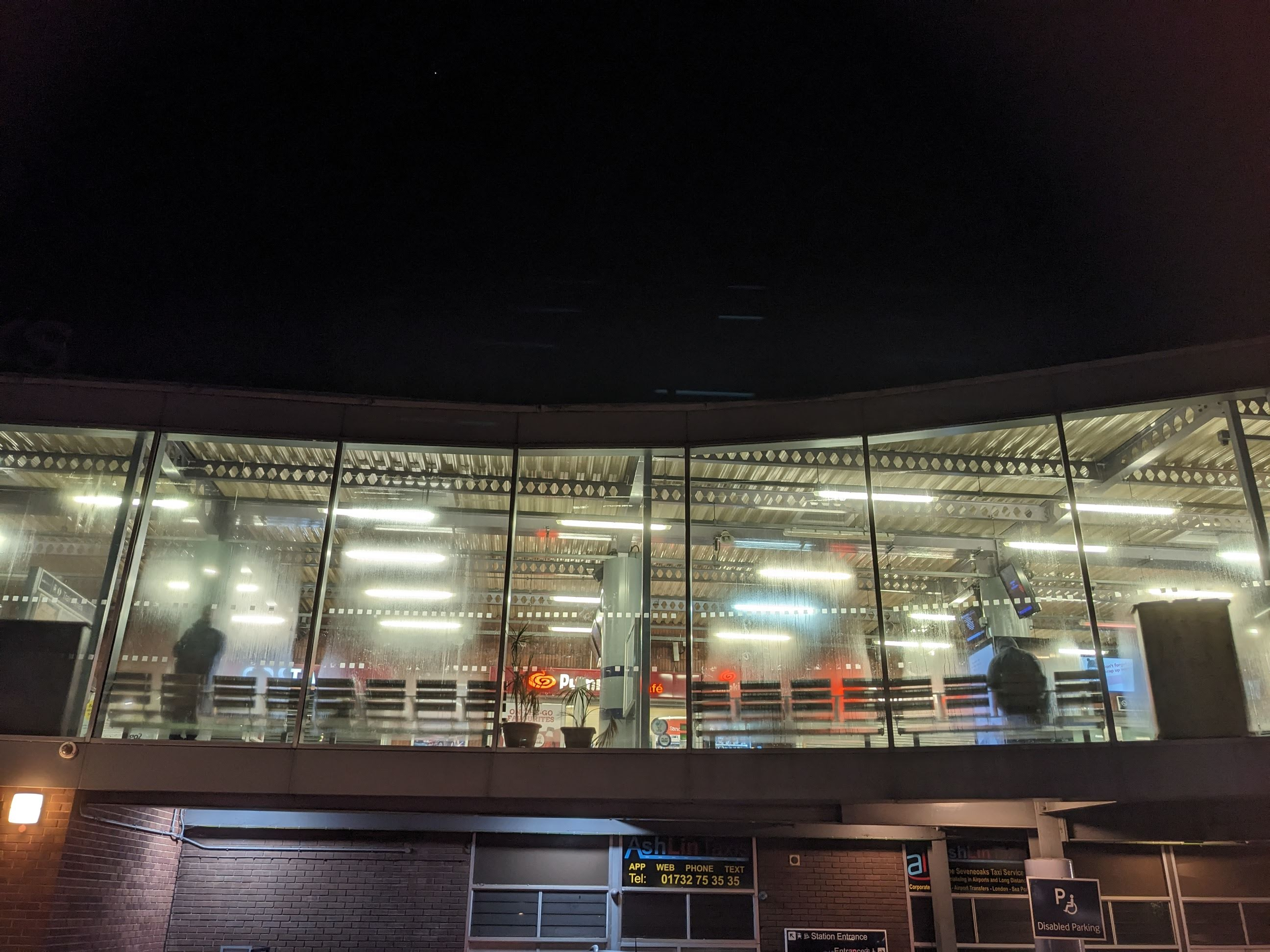
- The ticket hall in 2023. A public piano can be seen on the left.

General information
- Location: Sevenoaks, District of Sevenoaks; England
- Grid reference: TQ522553
- Manager: Southeastern
- Platforms: 4

Other information
- Station code: SEV
- Classification: DfT category B

History
- Opened: 2 March 1868
- Rebuilt: 1974

Passengers
- 2020/21: ▼0.845 million
- Interchange: ▼99,744
- 2021/22: ▲2.457 million
- Interchange: ▲0.248 million
- 2022/23: ▲3.140 million
- Interchange: ▲1.220 million
- 2023/24: ▲3.481 million
- Interchange: ▲1.303 million
- 2024/25: ▲3.741 million
- Interchange: ▼1.265 million
Location
Notes
- Passenger statistics from the Office of Rail and Road

Sevenoaks railway station is on the South Eastern Main Line, serving the town of Sevenoaks, in Kent, England. It is 22 miles 9 chains (35.6 km) down the line from London Charing Cross and is situated between Dunton Green and Hildenborough stations. Trains calling at the station are operated by Southeastern and Thameslink.

Trains from the station run northbound to London Bridge, Cannon Street, Waterloo East and Charing Cross via Orpington, or to Blackfriars via Swanley and Catford; southbound trains run to Ashford International and Ramsgate via Dover Priory, or Tunbridge Wells and Hastings.

== History ==
Sevenoaks railway station was opened on 2 March 1868. It was formerly known as Tubs Hill, after the adjacent area.

There is a second station to the north end of the town, on the branch to Swanley Junction, which opened on 2 June 1862; Bat & Ball is named after a local inn which is now closed.

The two lines to Sevenoaks were electrified in January 1935. When the station was reconstructed in the 1970s, a new ticket office was built replacing the old wooden South Eastern Railway building. The largest version of the Southern Region D70 type glass box station, this reconstruction was designed by regional architect Nigel Wikeley. Two additional side platforms were also demolished.

Sevenoaks is part of the rail franchise which, post-privatisation, was served by Connex South Eastern. Subsequent to their franchise termination in 2003, due to poor financial management, services were operated by South Eastern Trains, a wholly owned subsidiary of the Strategic Rail Authority. On 1 April 2006, Southeastern, owned by Govia, took over management of the station as part of the new Integrated Kent Franchise.

=== Accidents ===
There have been two accidents at the station:

- 7 June 1884 – A double-headed freight train ran into the rear of another freight train at Tub's Hill station. Both crew of the first train were killed. The Hildenborough signalman was charged with causing their deaths. The trains were being worked under the time interval system.
- 24 August 1927 – the Sevenoaks railway accident. River class tank locomotive No. 800 River Cray derailed at Shoreham Lane between Dunton Green and Sevenoaks. Thirteen people were killed and 20 were injured. The locomotives were withdrawn and rebuilt as tender locomotives.

== Platforms ==
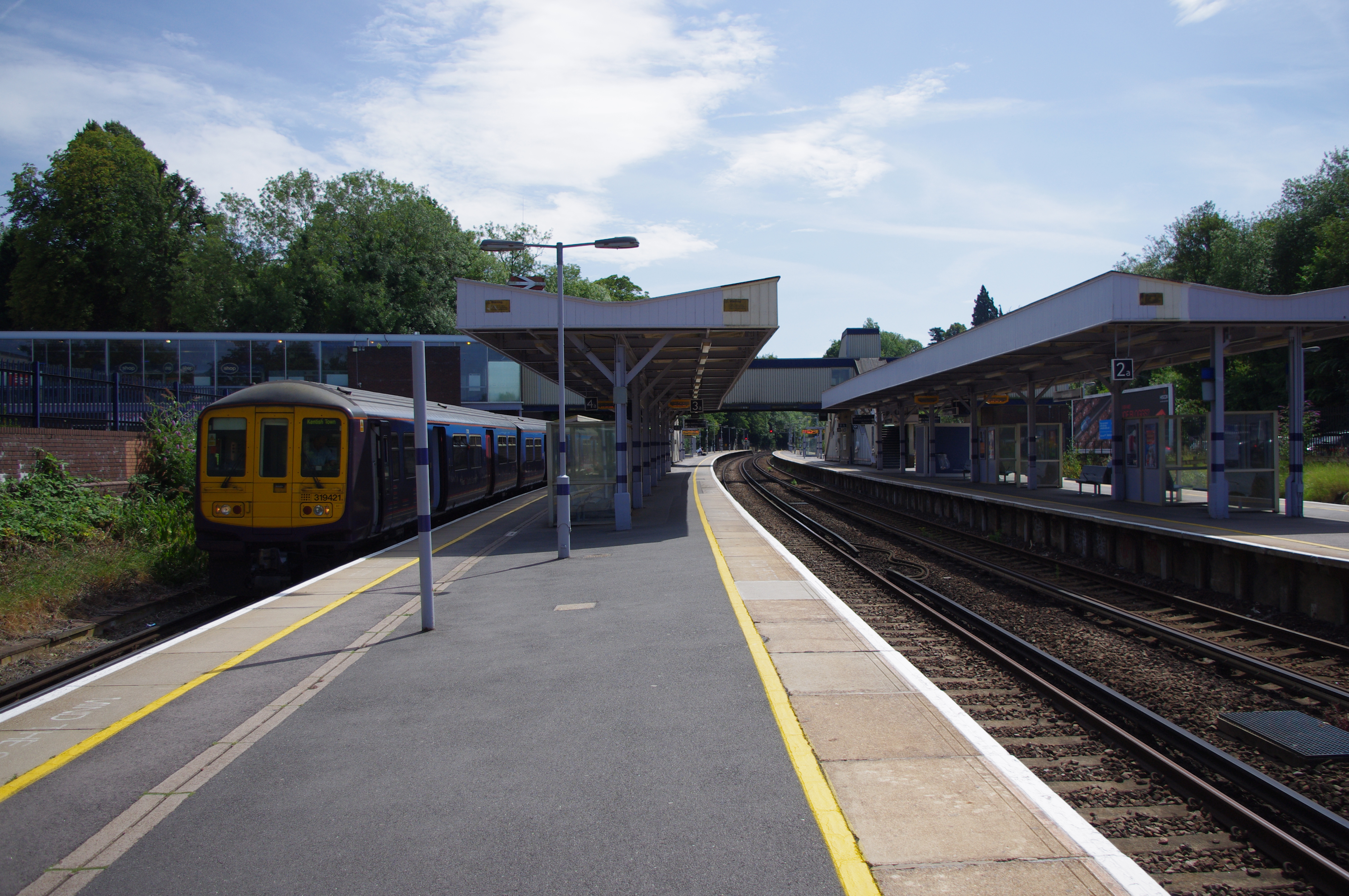
The view from platform 3 at Sevenoaks, looking south towards Tonbridge with a Thameslink train operating on behalf of Southeastern

There are two island platforms – 1 & 2, and 3 & 4:

- Platform 1 – Northbound fast trains (through Dunton Green) fast to London Bridge, Waterloo East, London Charing Cross and London Cannon Street
- Platform 2 – Slow trains starting/terminating at Sevenoaks (through Dunton Green) to London Charing Cross and London Cannon Street, via Orpington and Lewisham
- Platform 3 – Southbound trains via Tonbridge (destinations are Tunbridge Wells, Hastings, Ashford International, Canterbury and Ramsgate)
- Platform 4 – Thameslink trains (through Bat & Ball), which all start/terminate here

== Services ==
Services at Sevenoaks are operated by Southeastern and Thameslink, using Class 375, 376, 465, 466, 700 and 707 electric multiple units.

The typical off-peak service in trains per hour is:

- 4 tph to London Charing Cross (semi-fast)
- 2 tph to London Charing Cross via Grove Park and Lewisham (stopping)
- 2 tph to London Blackfriars, via Catford
- 2 tph to Hastings, via Tunbridge Wells (1 semi-fast, 1 stopping)
- 1 tph to Dover Priory
- 1 tph to Ramsgate, via Canterbury West

Additional services, including trains to and from London Cannon Street and Ramsgate, via Deal, call at the station during peak hours. In addition, the service to London Blackfriars is extended to and from Welwyn Garden City, via Finsbury Park.

Preceding station	National Rail	Following station
Dunton Green	Southeastern Grove Park Line	Terminus
London Bridge	Southeastern South Eastern Main Line	Tonbridge
Orpington	Southeastern Hastings Line	Hildenborough or Tonbridge
Bat & Ball	Thameslink Darent Valley Line	Terminus

== Passenger representation ==
The not-for-profit Sevenoaks Rail Travellers' Association (SRTA) corresponds and meets with Southeastern Railway, Transport for London, the Department for Transport, MPs and other relevant parties to represent the interests of passengers using Sevenoaks and nearby stations (Bat & Ball, Dunton Green, Eynsford, Kemsing, Otford and Shoreham).
