= Swanley railway station =

Railway station in Kent, England

Swanley
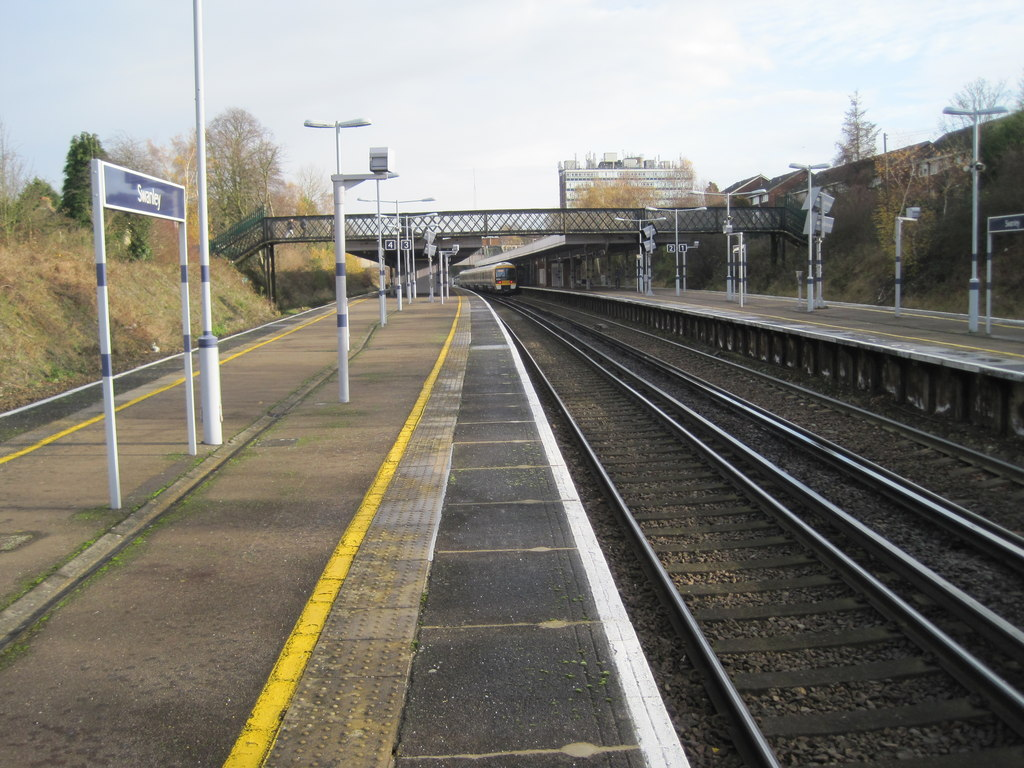
- Interactive map of Swanley

General information
- Location: Swanley
- Local authority: District of Sevenoaks
- Grid reference: TQ509682
- Managed by: Southeastern
- Station code: SAY
- DfT category: C2
- Number of platforms: 4
- Fare zone: 8

National Rail annual entry and exit
- 2020–21: ▼0.399 million
- Interchange: ▼21,609
- 2021–22: ▲0.922 million
- Interchange: ▲59,018
- 2022–23: ▲1.120 million
- Interchange: ▲0.263 million
- 2023–24: ▲1.345 million
- Interchange: ▼0.172 million
- 2024–25: ▲1.524 million
- Interchange: ▲0.181 million

Key dates
- 1 July 1862: Opened as Sevenoaks Junction
- 1 January 1871: Renamed Swanley Junction
- 16 April 1939: Resited and renamed Swanley

Other information
- External links: Departures; Facilities
- Coordinates: 51.3934°N 0.1690°E

Swanley railway station is on the Chatham Main Line in England, serving the town of Swanley, Kent. It is 17 miles 31 chains (28.0 km) down the line from London Victoria and is situated between St Mary Cray and Farningham Road on the main line. The Maidstone Line branches from the main line east of Swanley and the next station on that route is Eynsford.

The station and most trains that call are operated by Southeastern. The station has four platforms.

Since March 2016, Oyster cards have been accepted at Swanley, with the station being placed into London fare zone 8.

== History ==
The original location of the station was at grid reference TQ513684 at the junction with separate platforms for the main line and the Sevenoaks branch. It was first named Sevenoaks Junction and 1871 was changed to Swanley Junction. On 27 June 1937, there was a collision between two trains near the station, resulting in the deaths of four people and with 37 injured. In 1939 a new station called Swanley was constructed approximately 440 yards (400 m) further west and the original station was closed.

In May 2021, a new ticket office and station building was opened.

== Location ==
The station is located at Station Approach, half a mile from Swanley Town Centre.

== Facilities ==
The station has a staffed ticket office. The station has a self-service ticket machine and is also fitted with Oyster card readers. The station has passenger help points on its platforms and covered seating is available on all 4 platforms which are all fitted with passenger information screens. There are toilets located on platforms 1 and 2 as well as a passenger shop and buffet. The station has a chargeable car park (106 spaces) and a cycle rack at the station entrance. Step free access is available to all platforms from the Station Approach entrance.

== Services ==
Services at Swanley are operated by Southeastern and Thameslink using Class 375, 377, 465, 466 and 700 EMUs.

The typical off-peak service in trains per hour is:

- 1 tph to London Charing Cross (non-stop to London Bridge)
- 2 tph to London Victoria (semi-fast)
- 2 tph to London Blackfriars via Catford
- 1 tph to Gillingham
- 2 tph to Sevenoaks
- 1 tph to Maidstone East (semi-fast)
- 1 tph to Ashford International (stopping)

Additional services call at the station during the peak hours. In addition, the service to London Blackfriars is extended to and from Welwyn Garden City via Finsbury Park.

On Sundays, the services between London Charing Cross and Maidstone East do not run.

Preceding station	National Rail	Following station
London Bridge	Southeastern South Eastern Main Line (via Chislehurst Junction)	Otford
St Mary Cray	Southeastern Kent Downs line	Otford
St Mary Cray	Southeastern Chatham Main Line	Farningham Road
St Mary Cray	Thameslink Darent Valley Line	Eynsford
	Historical railways	
St Mary Cray Line and station open	Southern Railway Maidstone Line	Lullingstone Line open, station closed

== Connections ==
Go-Coach route 429 and Kent Country route 477 serve the station.
