= Maidstone East railway station =

Railway station in Kent, England

Coordinates: 51.278°N 0.521°E

Maidstone East
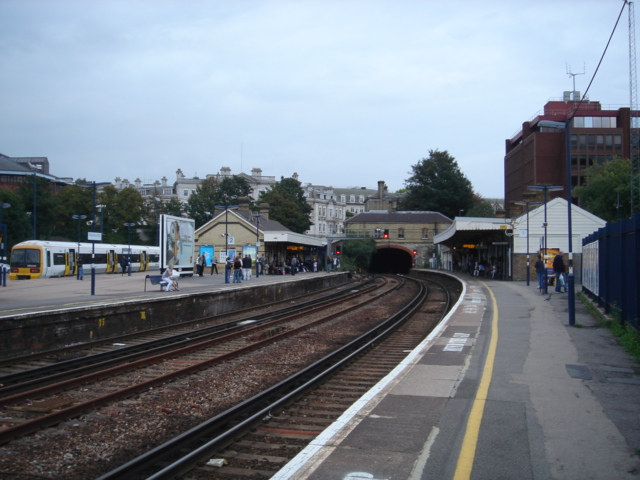

General information
- Location: Maidstone, Maidstone; England
- Grid reference: TQ758561
- Manager: Southeastern
- Platforms: 3

Other information
- Station code: MDE
- Classification: DfT category C1

Key dates
- 1874: Opened as Maidstone
- 1899: Renamed Maidstone East

Passengers
- 2021/22: ▲0.884 million
- Interchange: ▲22,109
- 2022/23: ▲1.035 million
- Interchange: ▲35,260
- 2023/24: ▲1.283 million
- Interchange: ▲53,246
- 2024/25: ▲1.727 million
- Interchange: ▼28,955
- 2025/26: ▲1.776 million
- Interchange: ▲39,178
Location
Notes
- Passenger statistics from the Office of Rail and Road

Maidstone East is one of three railway stations in the town of Maidstone, in Kent, England, the only one with a regular all-day direct service to London. The station is on the Maidstone line, 39 miles 76 chains (64.3 km) from London Victoria, and is served by trains operated by Southeastern.

== History ==
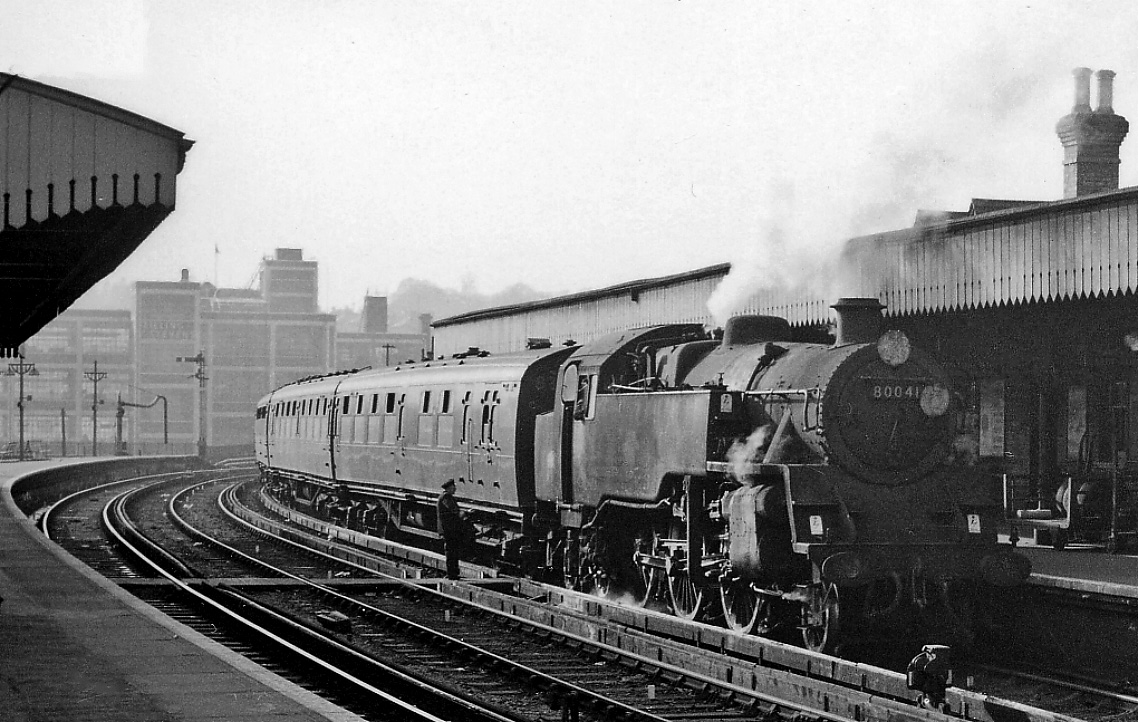
A local train to Ashford in 1961

Maidstone East was opened as Maidstone by the London, Chatham and Dover Railway (LCDR) on 1 June 1874, as the terminus of the line from Otford. The location of the station was determined by local geography, as the ground from the River Medway west of the station rises sharply to the east. Consequently, it was built on a restricted site across from a 113-foot (34 m) high-level bridge over the river, immediately before entering the 98-yard (90 m) Week Street tunnel. On 1 July 1884, the line was extended eastwards to Ashford West.

In 1899, following the merger of the LCDR with the South Eastern Railway (SER) which operated the Medway Valley line, the station was given its current name to distinguish it from the SER's identically named station which was renamed Maidstone West. Following the grouping of main line rail companies into regional railways in 1923, the Southern Railway undertook electrification as far as Maidstone East in 1939. Electrification to Ashford was carried out in 1961.

The high-level bridge over the Medway was rebuilt in 1927, as the original could not support the full weight of locomotive traffic. A footbridge was incorporated into the new bridge, allowing a shorter route to Maidstone Barracks station.

The goods yard comprised ten sidings on the down side and two on the up side. There was a goods shed and a 10-ton capacity crane. West of the high-level bridge, a siding on the down side served a corn mill. In 1939, this siding was electrified to provide berthing siding for electric multiple units. In 1882, the Midland Railway opened a coal depot at the station. Their successor, the London, Midland and Scottish Railway sold the depot in 1934, although it continued to be used for that purpose. Freight services at the station were withdrawn on 13 September 1965. A small locomotive depot was located on the up side. It closed in 1933. During the 1960s, Tony Hocking was a booking clerk at the station, famous locally for invariably having a bottle of Vimto visible on the desk despite this being in contravention of the strict railway bylaws of the era. On 2 August 2015, a fire damaged some of the station buildings. Part of the main goods yard was formerly a Royal Mail sorting office; the remainder is a car park for station users. A short siding from the down line to the west of platforms 2 and 3 is a remnant of tracks into the yard. The site of the up goods yard is now a car park.

=== Layout ===
The station is to the east of the River Medway, but it is clear from a map of the town that it is actually located at the northern end of Maidstone. The approach from the west is via a high level truss bridge over the river, and a later girder bridge over the A229. Immediately east of the station is the portal to the 98 yards (90 m) Week Street tunnel.

The booking office, open for most of the operational day, is located at street level on Station Road, above the tunnel portal, with other offices on up platform 1 as well as a coffee shop. There are also offices on platform 2.

The station has three platforms: one and two are through platforms; three is a bay platform on the north down side. All three platforms are capable of handling and are often used by trains of up to eight coaches. Ramps lead down to the platforms on each side. A disused face to platform 1 shows the alignment of a former bay platform. A third track runs as a passing track through the station between the up and down lines.

A pedestrian walkway on the railway bridge provides a route to the Medway Valley Line's Maidstone Barracks station on the west of the river. Maidstone's third station, Maidstone West, is 0.5 miles (800 m) south of Maidstone Barracks.

=== Development ===
In the early 21st century there were plans to redevelop the station. In 2005, Network Rail announced that they were in talks with the John Lewis Partnership who intended to build a large Waitrose supermarket on the site. However, in November of that year, the developer that had been working on the deal and John Lewis withdrew.

The following year, a new redevelopment in conjunction with supermarket chain Asda was proposed, with a 50,000 sq ft (5,000 m^{2}) store, hotel, 100 homes and parking for 515 cars. In 2009 Asda withdrew, due to their development of a site at the nearby St Peters' Street complex instead.

In November 2012, initial plans for the regeneration of Maidstone East Station were submitted to Maidstone Borough Council (MBC) to determine whether an Environmental Impact Assessment was required. MBC concluded in December 2012 that due to the additional road traffic, an assessment would be appropriate. Plans include a new railway station, new large foodstore, other retail units, bar, cafe, commuter and retail parking (approx 1,100 spaces), with associated landscaping. The proposed plan involves the demolition of the existing station ticket office, a disused hotel/bar, retail units opposite County Hall and the adjacent former Royal Mail sorting and enquiry office. The redevelopment was seen as "a key part of Kent County and Maidstone Borough Council's plans to regenerate the area around the station and create a gateway to the town". A new station entrance was completed in 2021 as part of the £2.5m project expanding the station to accommodate thousands more passengers as part of a town centre regeneration led by Kent County Council. In 2025 plans were approved for redevelopment of the former Royal Mail site at the station.

=== Accidents ===
The station has been the site of two accidents involving freight trains:

- In the first, on 17 July 1967, a slow-moving westbound train passed a signal at danger and ran into the rear of a stationary passenger train at the up platform. It caused damage to both trains, but only interrupted services for a few hours.
- The second, on 6 September 1993, was more significant. At 02:02, a freight derailment occurred. A train, comprising 15 goods wagons was travelling from Dover to Willesden hauled by a Class 47 locomotive 47 288, when, due to excessive speed, the locomotive's rear bogie derailed in the tunnel approaching Maidstone East. The train was travelling at 60 miles per hour (97 km/h) when the speed limit was 25 miles per hour (40 km/h). The locomotive ended up on its side on the track. Several wagons left the track, running into signals, platforms and buildings, and spilling their load of 900 tons of steel cable. The driver subsequently failed a breathalyser test. The station remained closed for several months as a result of the accident.

== Services ==
All services at Maidstone East are operated by Southeastern, using Class 375 and 377 electric multiple units.

The typical off-peak service in trains per hour is:

- 1 tph to London Victoria (stopping)
- 1 tph to London Charing Cross (semi-fast)
- 1 tph to Ashford International

During peak hours, the terminating services from London Charing Cross are extended to Ashford International. The frequency of the Victoria and Charing Cross services also increase to 2tph in each direction.

On Sundays, the semi-fast services to London Charing Cross do not run.

Preceding station	National Rail	Following station
Barming or West Malling	Southeastern Kent Downs line	Bearsted or Terminus

== See also ==
- Maidstone Barracks railway station, on the Medway Valley line
- Maidstone West railway station, on the Medway Valley line
