= Kent Downs line =

Railway line in the UK

Coordinates: 51.2778°N 0.5228°E

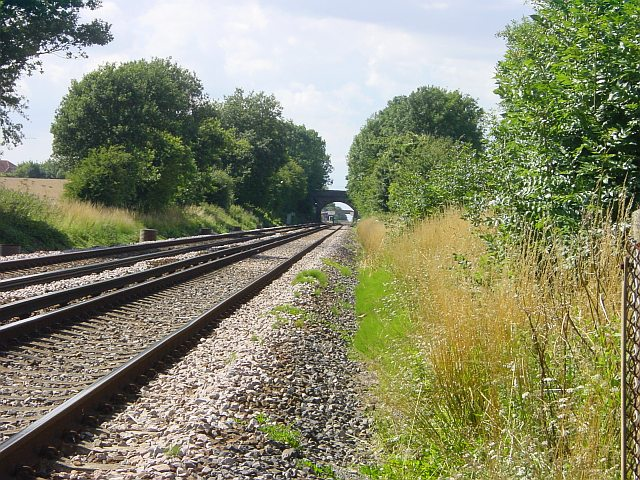
- Looking west along the railway near Lenham

Overview
- Status: Operational
- Owner: Network Rail
- Locale: Kent; South East England
- Termini: Otford; Ashford international

Service
- Type: Suburban rail, Heavy rail
- System: National Rail
- Operator(s): Southeastern; Thameslink
- Rolling stock: Class 375 "Electrostar"; Class 465 "Networker"; Class 466 "Networker"; Class 700 "Desiro City"

Technical
- Line length: 76 mi 17 ch (122.7 km)
- Track gauge: 1,435 mm (4 ft 8 1/2 in) standard gauge
- Electrification: 750 V DC third rail

The Kent Downs line is a railway line between Otford and Ashford International in Kent, England. It adopted its current name in 2020, by the Kent Rail Partnership.

It covers a large part of what was known as the Maidstone line which extended further from Otford to Swanley. This line diverged from the Chatham Main Line at Swanley Junction, and proceeds down the Darent Valley line to Otford junction, where the Darent Valley line, also known as the Bat & Ball line, divides towards Sevenoaks. Whereas the line now known as Kent Downs, continues via Borough Green & Wrotham and Maidstone East to Ashford, where it joins the South Eastern Main Line.

== History ==
Maidstone and Ashford Railway Act 1880
- Act of Parliament
- Parliament of the United Kingdom
- Long title: An Act for making Railways between Maidstone and Ashford in the county of Kent; and for other purposes.
- Citation: 43 & 44 Vict. c. clix

Dates
- Royal assent: 12 August 1880

Text of statute as originally enacted

The line was authorised by the Maidstone and Ashford Railway Act 1880 (43 & 44 Vict. c. clix) and built by the London, Chatham and Dover Railway from their first line (the Chatham Main Line). The final section to Ashford opened on 1 July 1884 and terminated at Ashford West. There was initially no direct connection to the rival South Eastern Railway's existing station.

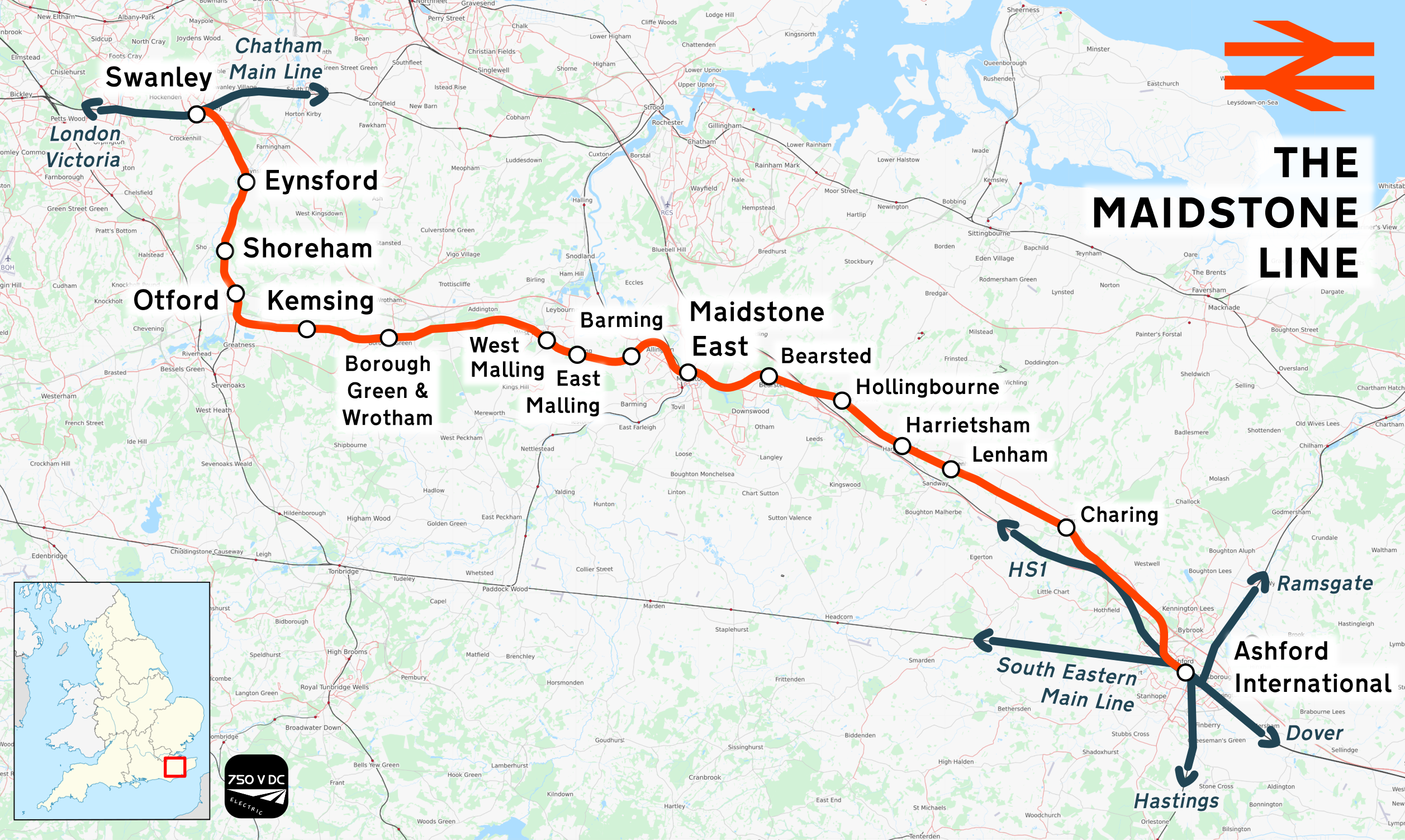
The former Maidstone line, Otford to Ashford form the Kent Downs line, while the remaining parts are on the Darent Valley line.

Upon the creation of the South Eastern and Chatham Railway in 1899, Ashford West was closed and services diverted to the former South Eastern Railway station. The line was electrified in 1939 (750 V DC third rail) to Maidstone East by the Southern Railway prior to World War Two. Electrification between Maidstone East and Ashford was completed in 1961 under the BR 1955 Modernisation Plan.

In 2020 the line from Ashford International to Otford was adopted by the Kent Rail Partnership and this section was renamed the Kent Downs line.

== Infrastructure ==
Traction current is supplied at 750 volts DC via the Third Rail. The supply for this is overseen by Paddock Wood Electrical Control Room. Signalling is Track Circuit Block with multiple aspect colour light signals throughout, controlled by Maidstone East Signal Box. The line is double track throughout.

== Services ==
Services on the line are run by Southeastern. Services run to London Victoria, London Charing Cross and Ashford, with some peak services to London Blackfriars.

In the off-peak, there are one train per hour from Ashford International to London Victoria via Bromley South and Swanley stopping at all stations between Ashford and Otford and one train per hour from Maidstone East to London Charing Cross running semi-fast via Swanley and London Bridge. These services are operated by Class 375 and Class 377 EMUs.

Thameslink utilises the route between Swanley and Otford on their London Blackfriars to Sevenoaks metro services via the Catford Loop and Elephant and Castle with two trains per hour running. Additional services through London will be introduced as part of the Thameslink Programme between Cambridge and Maidstone East. As of June 2024, these services have not yet been introduced with no news about their future.
