= Newington railway station =

Railway station in Kent, England

Newington
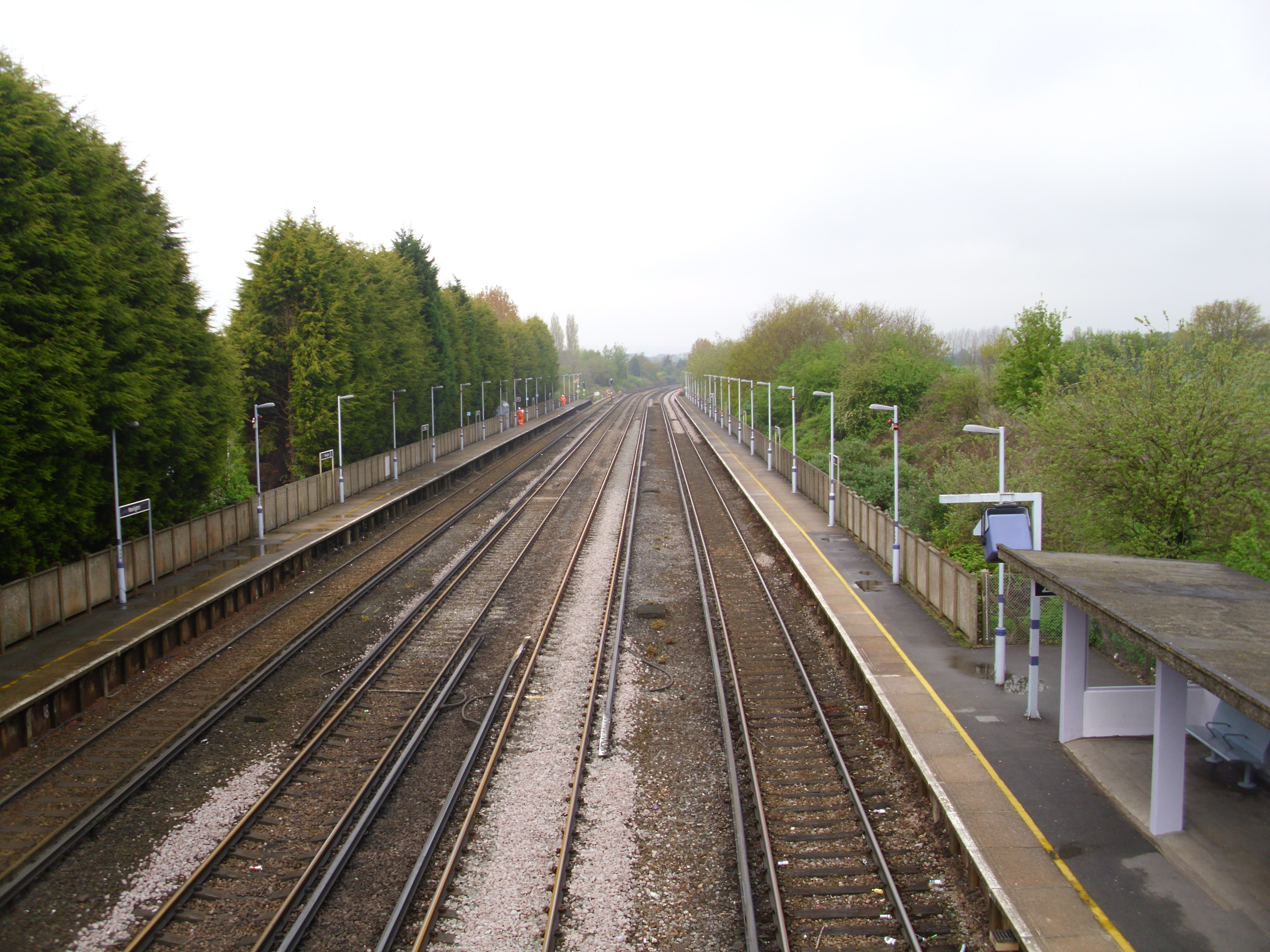

General information
- Location: Newington, Swale; England
- Coordinates: 51°21′12.20″N 0°40′5.24″E
- Grid reference: TQ858649
- Managed by: Southeastern
- Platforms: 2
- Tracks: 4

Other information
- Station code: NGT
- Classification: DfT category E

History
- Original company: London, Chatham and Dover Railway
- Pre-grouping: South Eastern and Chatham Railway
- Post-grouping: Southern Railway

Key dates
- 25 January 1858: Line opened
- 1 August 1862: Station opened

Passengers
- 2020/21: ▼46,772
- 2021/22: ▲0.102 million
- 2022/23: ▲0.116 million
- 2023/24: ▲0.126 million
- 2024/25: ▲0.141 million
Location
Notes
- Passenger statistics from the Office of Rail and Road

Newington railway station is on the Chatham Main Line in England, serving the village of Newington, Kent. It is 41 miles 44 chains (66.9 km) down the line from London Victoria and is situated between Rainham and Sittingbourne.

The station and all trains that call are operated by Southeastern.

== History ==
The railway line between Chatham and Faversham was opened on 25 January 1858 by the East Kent Railway, which became the London, Chatham and Dover Railway (LCDR) the following year. A station on that line at Newington was opened by the LCDR on 1 August 1862.

== Facilities ==
The station is 41 miles 42 chains (66.8 km) from London Victoria (measured via Herne Hill). Most of the line between Swanley and Dover has two tracks, but there are four tracks from a point about half a mile east of Rainham to 41 miles 52 chains (67.0 km), at the eastern end of Newington station. The outermost two tracks are designated the "loop" lines, and the innermost two are the "main" lines. At Newington, there are two platforms, one on each of the "loop" lines; these are capable of accepting 12 car trains.

== Services ==
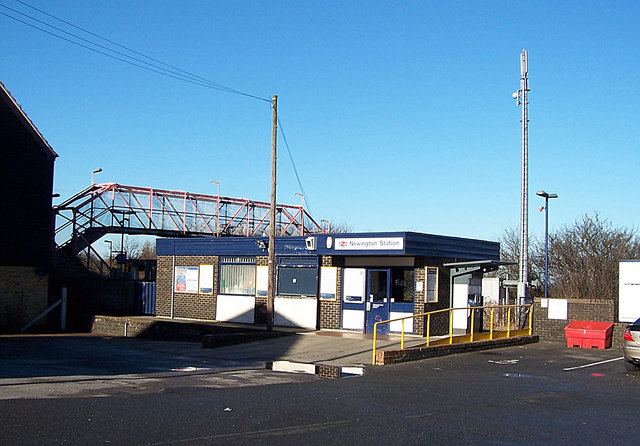
Front entrance to Newington railway station

All services at Newington are operated by Southeastern using Class 375 EMUs.

The typical off-peak service in trains per hour is:

- 1 tph to London Victoria
- 1 tph to Dover Priory via Canterbury East

Additional services including trains to and from London Bridge and London Cannon Street call at the station in the peak hours.

Preceding station	National Rail	Following station
Rainham	Southeastern Chatham Main Line	Sittingbourne
