= London Victoria carriage holding sidings =

Train stabling point in Westminster, London

Location
- Location: Westminster, London
- Coordinates: 51.4884°N 0.1486°W
- OS grid: TQ286782

Characteristics
- Owner: Network Rail
- Type: EMU

London Victoria Carriage Holding Sidings, also known as Grosvenor Road Carriage Sidings, is a stabling point located in Westminster, London, England. The stabling point is situated on the western side of the Chatham Main Line, to the south of London Victoria station.

London Victoria Depot is on the opposite side of the line.

== History ==
In 2004, Class 365, 377, 421 and 423 EMUs could be seen there.

== Present ==
As of 2018, stabling is provided for Southern Class 377 and Southeastern Class 375 EMUs.
