= Kemsley railway station =

Railway station in Kent, England

Coordinates: 51°21′43.74″N 0°44′7.21″E

Kemsley
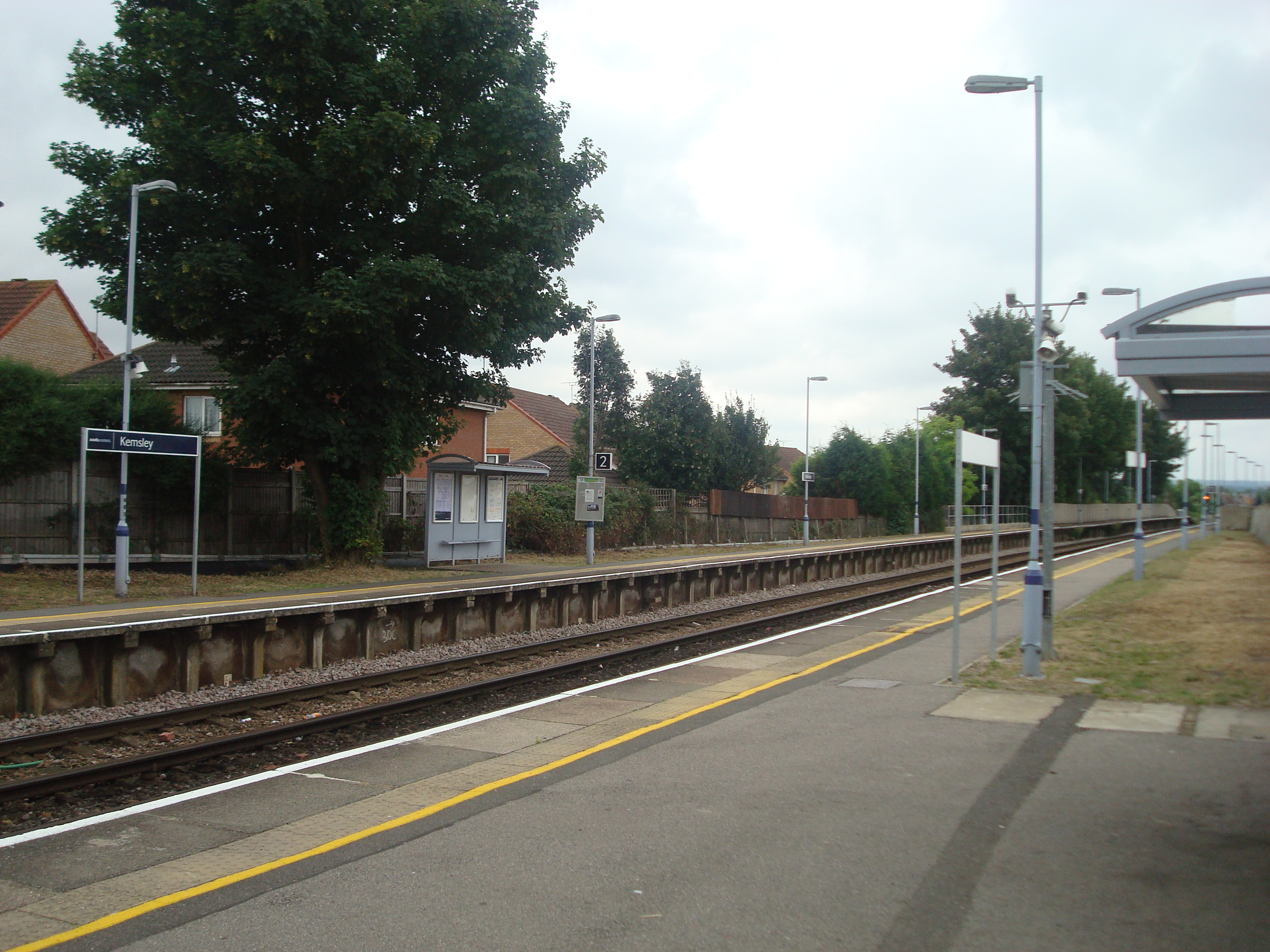

General information
- Location: Kemsley, Swale; England
- Grid reference: TQ905660
- Managed by: Southeastern
- Platforms: 2

Other information
- Station code: KML
- Classification: DfT category F2

Key dates
- 1 January 1927: Opened

Passengers
- 2020/21: ▼72,874
- 2021/22: ▲0.152 million
- 2022/23: ▲0.154 million
- 2023/24: ▲0.200 million
- 2024/25: ▲0.209 million
Location
Notes
- Passenger statistics from the Office of Rail and Road

Kemsley railway station is on the Sheerness Line in north Kent, England, and serves the village of Kemsley. It is 45 miles 20 chains (72.8 km) down the line from London Victoria. Train services are provided by Southeastern.

== History ==
The station was opened by the Southern Railway as Kemsley Halt on 1 January 1927. It was renamed to Kemsley by British Rail on 5 May 1969.

== Facilities ==
There are two platforms but no station building at this unstaffed location. Access between the two platforms is via a footbridge or the road bridge (for step-free access) to the north of the station. Services towards Swale, Queenborough and Sheerness-on-Sea depart from platform 1. Services to Sittingbourne and London depart from platform 2.

== Services ==
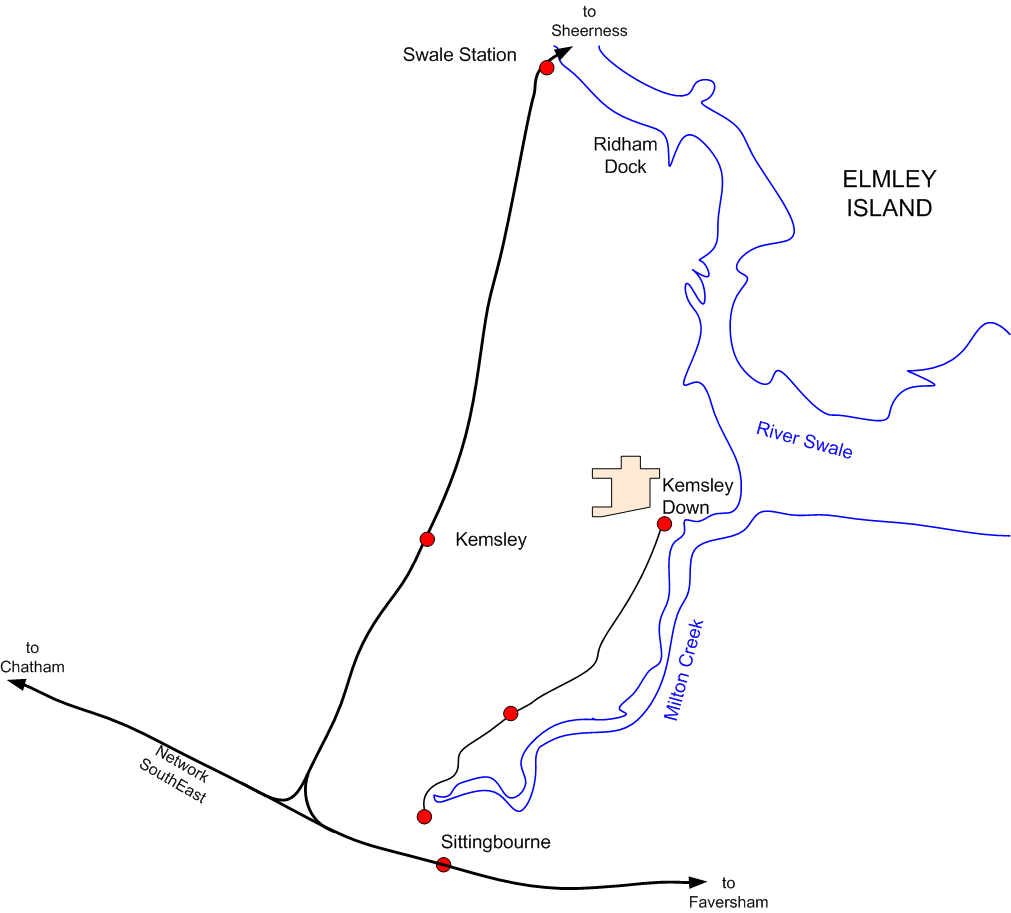
Station map in relation to the local area

All services at Kemsley are operated by Southeastern using Class 375 EMUs.

The typical off-peak service is one train per hour in each direction between Sheerness-on-Sea and Sittingbourne, from where connections are available to London Victoria, London St Pancras International, Dover Priory and Ramsgate. During the peak hours, the service is increased to two trains per hour in each direction.

Preceding station	National Rail	Following station
Sittingbourne	Southeastern Sheerness Line	Swale
