= Teynham railway station =

Railway station in Kent, England

Teynham
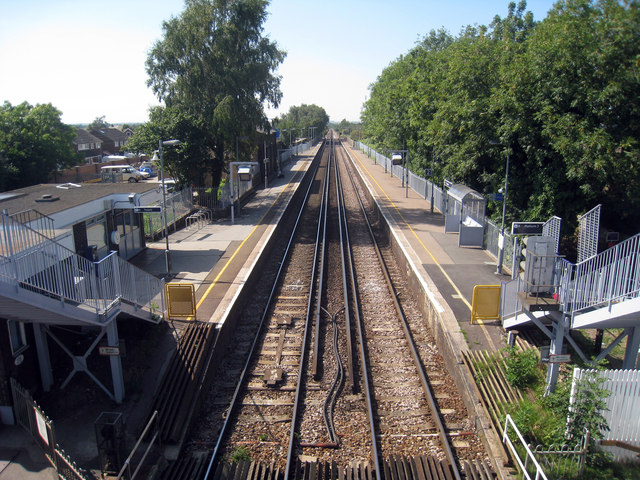
- View west towards Sittingbourne

General information
- Location: Teynham, Swale; England
- Coordinates: 51°19′59.74″N 0°48′28.68″E
- Grid reference: TQ956631
- Managed by: Southeastern
- Platforms: 2

Other information
- Station code: TEY
- Classification: DfT category E

History
- Original company: East Kent Railway
- Pre-grouping: South Eastern and Chatham Railway
- Post-grouping: Southern Railway

Key dates
- 25 January 1858: Station opened

Passengers
- 2020/21: ▼51,660
- 2021/22: ▲0.119 million
- 2022/23: ▲0.135 million
- 2023/24: ▲0.168 million
- 2024/25: ▲0.181 million
Location
Notes
- Passenger statistics from the Office of Rail and Road

Teynham railway station is on the Chatham Main Line in England, serving the village of Teynham, Kent. It is 47 miles 74 chains (77.1 km) down the line from London Victoria and is situated between Sittingbourne and Faversham.

The station and all trains that call are operated by Southeastern.

On the London-bound platform, there is a staffed booking office which is open Monday to Friday 06:30-09:30 only. At all other times, including Saturday and Sunday the station is unstaffed.

Outside of these hours tickets can be purchased via a S&B Ticket Vending Machine (TVM Lite) machine. This offers a full range of day and open tickets from any station to any station on the UK network with Railcard discounts, subject to the Railcard Restrictions. It also offers Weekly, Monthly and Yearly tickets (photocard or smart Key Card required, previous purchases required for Monthly and above). However TVM Lites only accept card payments and therefore Passengers with cash will need to pay on the train with the Conductor or as soon as possible at the next available staffed ticket office.

== History ==
The section of the East Kent Railway between Chatham and Faversham opened on 25 January 1858, and Teynham station opened with the line.

The original two-storey brick built station was demolished in the 1970s and replaced by the prefabricated buildings popular at the time. A manually operated crossing to allow access to Station Row to the north of the line was finally replaced with automatic gates during the upgrading of signalling in December 2011.

== Accidents and incidents ==
- In December 1861, a passenger train was derailed due to elongation of the gap at a rail joint during cold weather.

== Services ==
All services at Teynham are operated by Southeastern using Class 375 EMUs.

The typical off-peak service in trains per hour is:

- 1 tph to London Victoria
- 1 tph to Dover Priory via Canterbury East

Additional services including trains to and from London Bridge and London Cannon Street call at the station in the peak hours.

Preceding station	National Rail	Following station
Sittingbourne	Southeastern Chatham Main Line	Faversham
