= Rainham railway station (Kent) =

Railway station in Kent, England

Rainham
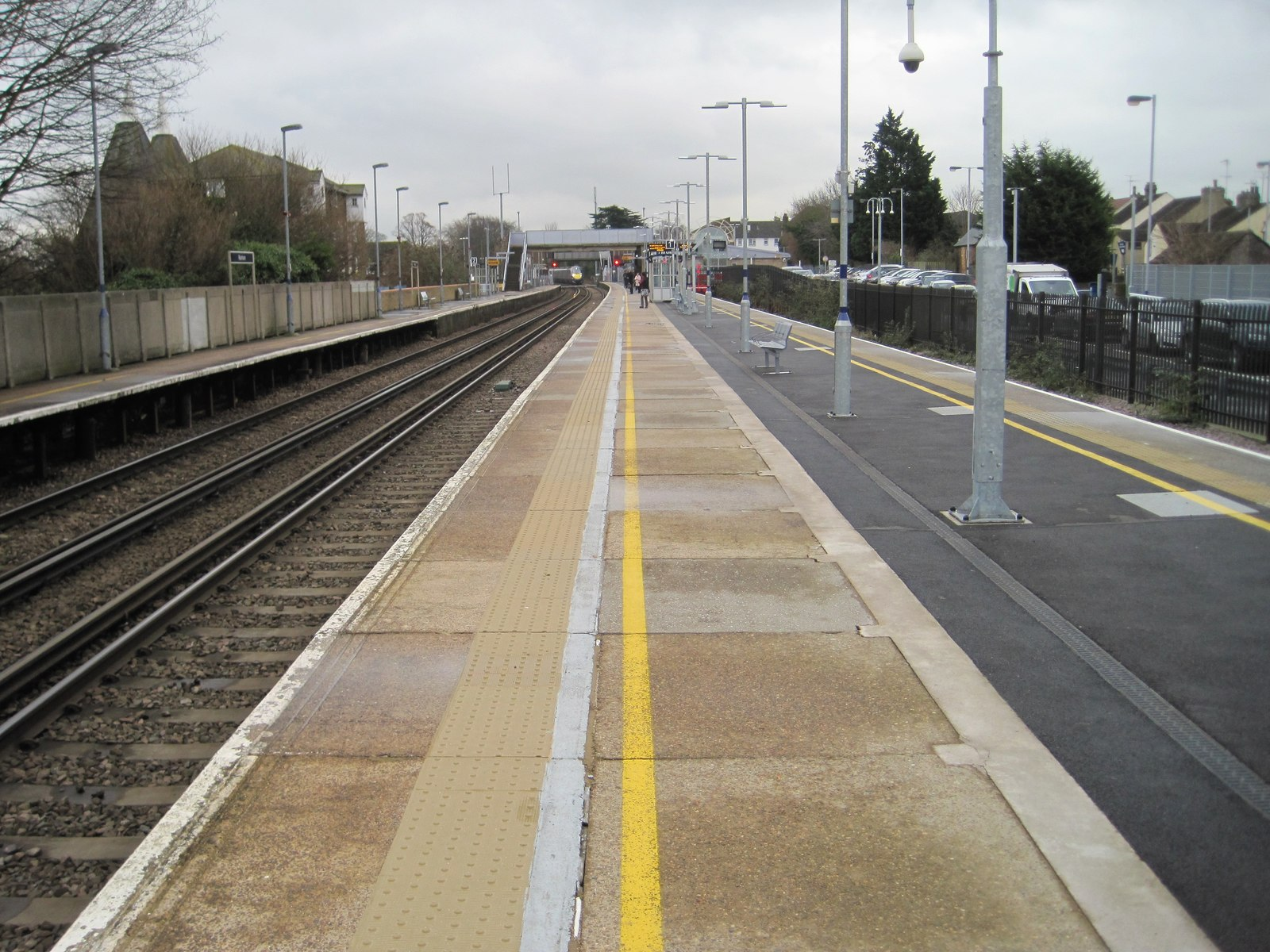
- The station looking eastbound, 2017

General information
- Location: Rainham, Borough of Medway; England
- Coordinates: 51.366411°N 0.611328°E
- Grid reference: TQ818662
- Managed by: Southeastern
- Platforms: 3 (numbered 0-2)

Other information
- Station code: RAI
- Classification: DfT category C2

Key dates
- 25 Jan 1858: Opened as Rainham and Newington
- 1 Aug 1862: Renamed Rainham

Passengers
- 2020/21: ▼0.456 million
- 2021/22: ▲1.155 million
- 2022/23: ▲1.390 million
- Interchange: 8,960
- 2023/24: ▲1.530 million
- Interchange: ▼7,503
- 2024/25: ▲1.702 million
- Interchange: ▼7,214
Location
Notes
- Passenger statistics from the Office of Rail and Road

Rainham railway station is on the Chatham Main Line in South East England, serving the town of Rainham, Kent. It is 38 miles 74 chains (62.6 km) down the line from London Victoria and is situated between Gillingham and Newington.

The station and most trains that call are operated by Southeastern. Following a timetable change on Sunday 20 May 2018, some trains are operated by Govia Thameslink. The station has three platforms. Platform 0 is an "up" bay platform, used mainly by Thameslink Services. Platform 1 is an "up" through providing services towards London, and Platform 2 is a "down" through for services towards Ramsgate and Dover Priory.

It is sometimes shown as Rainham (Kent) in order to distinguish it from the station of the same name in East London.

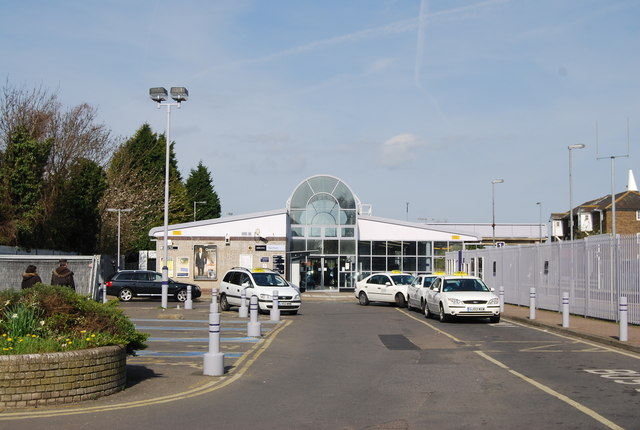
Rainham railway station building forecourt front

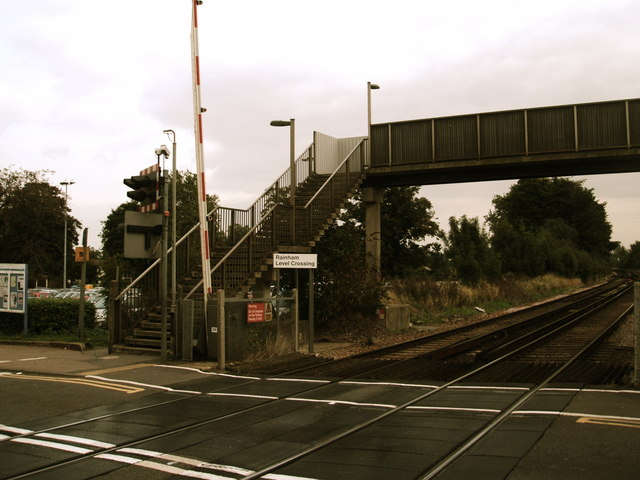
Crossing road for passengers requiring accessible entrances to interchange platforms

There are accessible entrances without stairs on both platforms, with step-free access via Platform 1 for services towards London (via main station entrance). Step-free access via Platform 2 for services away from London (via side entrance, short ramp from Granary Close). To interchange platforms, people needing accessible access must use the road and steep paths in excess of 250 metres. (There is also a steep staircase overpass over the tracks to interchange platforms.)

Induction loops are available and ticket counters are able to be lowered or raised. There are also accessible ticket machines in the station forecourt. There are fold-away ramps available on platforms for wheelchair train access.

== Services ==
Services at Rainham are operated by Southeastern and Thameslink using Class 375, 395 and 700 EMUs.

The typical off-peak service in trains per hour is:

- 2 tph to London St Pancras International
- 2 tph to London Victoria
- 2 tph to Luton via Dartford and Greenwich
- 1 tph to Faversham
- 1 tph to Dover Priory via Canterbury East
- 2 tph to Ramsgate

Additional services, including trains to and from London Bridge and London Cannon Street call at the station in the peak hours.

Preceding station	National Rail	Following station
Gillingham	Southeastern Chatham Main Line	Newington or Sittingbourne
Gillingham	Southeastern High Speed 1	Sittingbourne
Gillingham	Thameslink North Kent Line	Terminus

== Thameslink Programme ==
In connection with the rebuild of Rochester Station, a new bay platform has been added on the south side (facing towards London).
Trains are now able to use this new platform as the East Kent Resignalling Project has been completed. Initially, only a couple of trains used it in the evening rush hour, but since May 2018, Thameslink trains are now starting from here to Luton, via Gravesend, Dartford and Greenwich. This replaces the Gillingham to Charing Cross services, meaning passengers will have to change at Dartford or London Bridge for Charing Cross or Cannon Street.
