= Sittingbourne railway station =

Railway station in Kent, England

Coordinates: 51°20′31.23″N 0°44′5.31″E

Sittingbourne
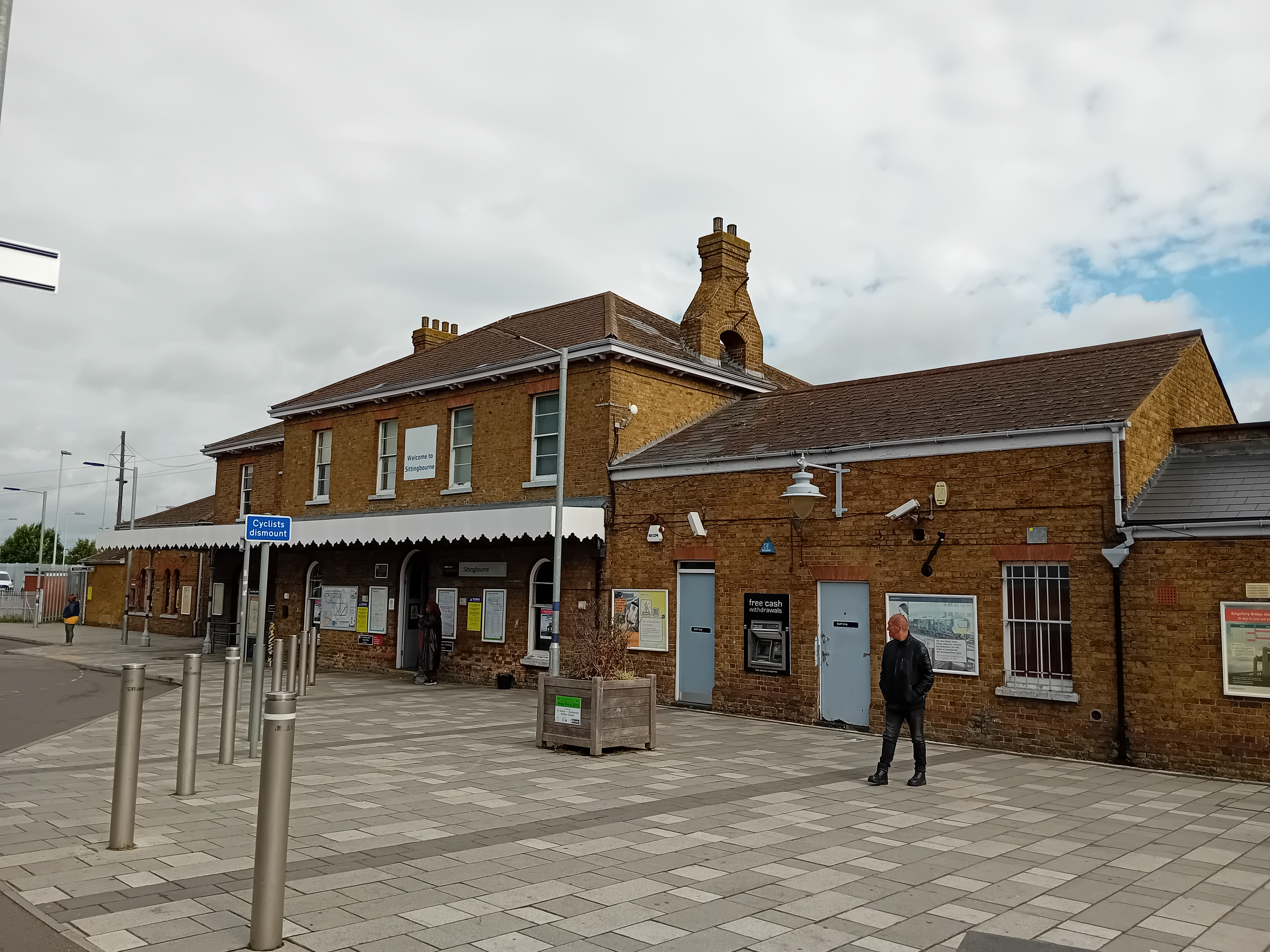
- Exterior view of Sittingbourne railway station

General information
- Location: Sittingbourne, Swale; England
- Grid reference: TQ905638
- Managed by: Southeastern
- Platforms: 3

Other information
- Station code: SIT
- Classification: DfT category C2

Key dates
- 25 January 1858: Opened

Passengers
- 2020/21: ▼0.750 million
- Interchange: ▼0.117 million
- 2021/22: ▲1.659 million
- Interchange: ▲0.317 million
- 2022/23: ▲1.876 million
- Interchange: 0.317 million
- 2023/24: ▲2.084 million
- Interchange: ▲0.367 million
- 2024/25: ▲2.327 million
- Interchange: ▲0.416 million
Location
Notes
- Passenger statistics from the Office of Rail and Road

Sittingbourne railway station is on the Chatham Main Line and the Sheerness Line in north Kent. It is 44 miles 59 chains (72.0 km) down the line from London Victoria. Train services are provided by Southeastern.

== History ==
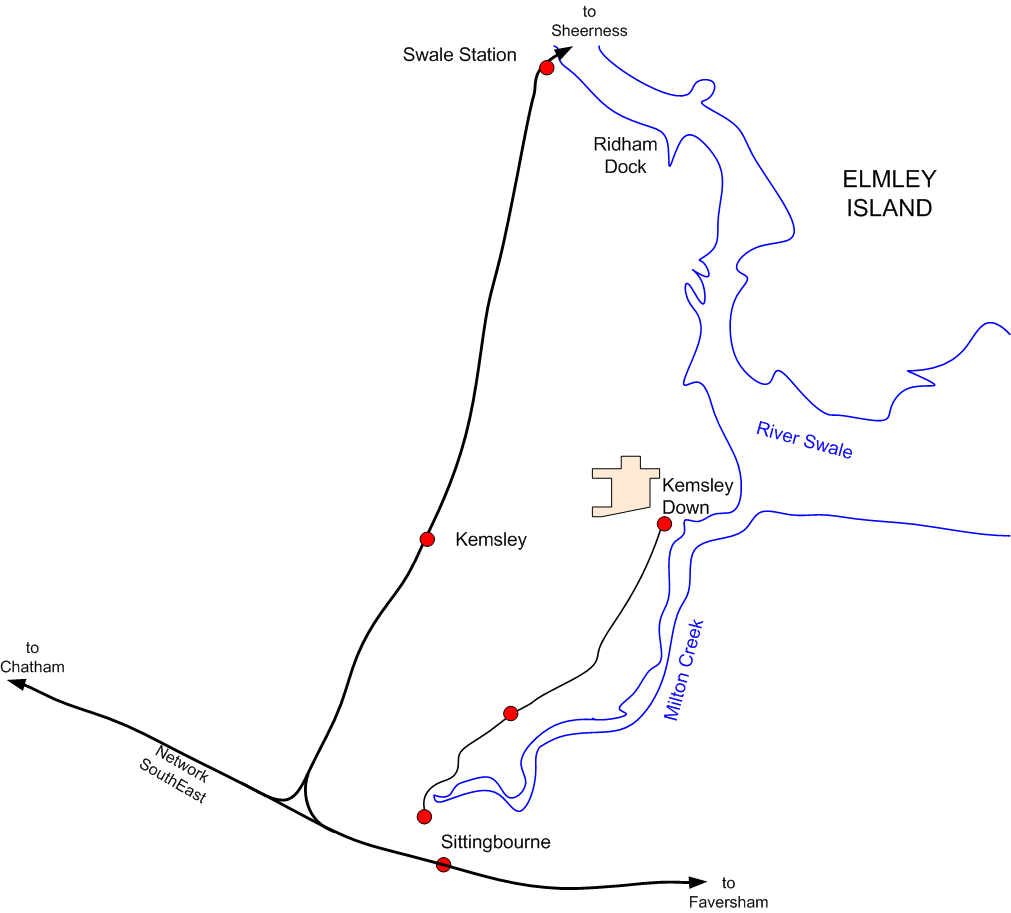
Map of the Sittingbourne Railway Station in relation to other local stations and the Sittingbourne & Kemsley Light Railway. The Chatham Main Line runs along the bottom, east to west, while the Sheerness Line branches off northwards, west of Sittingbourne.

The station opened on 25 January 1858. On 1 July 1899, it was renamed to Sittingbourne & Milton, and was further renamed to Sittingbourne & Milton Regis in 1908. The station reverted to its current name in 1970.

== Accidents and incidents ==
- In January 1861, a passenger train was derailed. One passenger was killed.
- On 31 August 1878, a passenger train collided with some goods wagons. Five people were killed.
- On 27 July 1966, a freight train was derailed at Sittingbourne West Junction. The line was blocked for two days.

== Facilities ==
Two new lifts linked by a new footbridge have created a step-free route between the station entrance and platforms to provide better access to train services. The improvements have been funded through the government’s Access for All programme and cost around £1,800,000.

The work has also included a series of enhancements to station facilities funded through the National Stations Improvement Programme and include relocating and increasing the number of cycle parking spaces outside the station; renovating all passenger toilets; creating new waiting shelters on the platforms and a new waiting room on platform; repositioning the ticket gates to create more space for passengers in the ticket office; and installing a new customer information screen and non-slip flooring in the ticket office.

The Sittingbourne & Kemsley Light Railway's station, at Sittingbourne Viaduct, is a short walk away.

== Services ==
All services at Sittingbourne are operated by Southeastern using Class 375 and 395 EMUs.

The typical off-peak service in trains per hour is:

- 2 tph to London St Pancras International
- 2 tph to London Victoria
- 1 tph to Faversham
- 1 tph to Dover Priory via Canterbury East
- 2 tph to Ramsgate
- 1 tph to Sheerness-on-Sea

Additional services including trains to and from London Bridge and London Cannon Street call at the station in the peak hours.

Preceding station	National Rail	Following station
Newington	Southeastern Chatham Main Line	Teynham
Rainham	Southeastern Chatham Main Line	Faversham
Rainham	Southeastern High Speed 1	Faversham
Kemsley	Southeastern Sheerness line	Terminus

== Bibliography ==
- Quick, Michael (2023). Railway Passenger Stations in Great Britain: A Chronology (PDF) (5th ed.). London: Railway and Canal Historical Society.
