= Sheerness-on-Sea railway station =

Railway station in Kent, England

Coordinates: 51°26′28″N 0°45′31″E

Sheerness-on-Sea
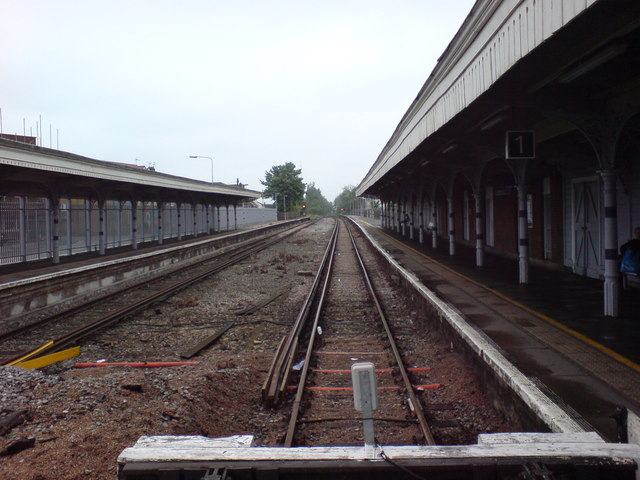

General information
- Location: Sheerness, Swale; England
- Grid reference: TQ917748
- Managed by: Southeastern
- Platforms: 2

Other information
- Station code: SSS
- Classification: DfT category E

Key dates
- 1 June 1883: Opened
- 8 November 1914: Closed
- 2 January 1922: Reopened

Passengers
- 2020/21: ▼0.133 million
- 2021/22: ▲0.332 million
- 2022/23: ▲0.349 million
- 2023/24: ▲0.408 million
- 2024/25: ▲0.439 million
Location
Notes
- Passenger statistics from the Office of Rail and Road

Sheerness-on-Sea railway station is on the Sheerness Line in north Kent, England, and serves the town of Sheerness. It is 51 miles 19 chains (82.5 km) down the line from London Victoria.

Train services are provided by Southeastern.

== History ==
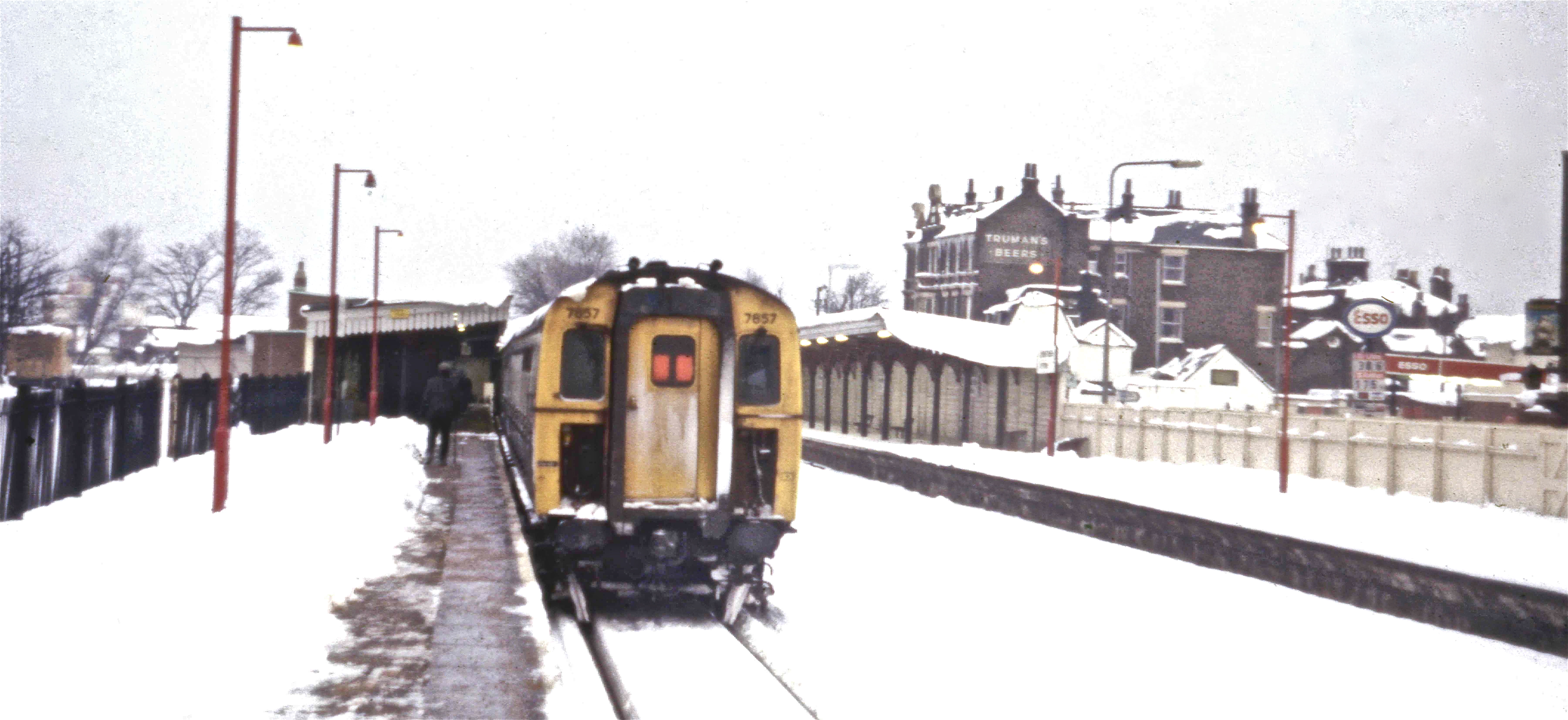
The station in 1987. A Class 423 can also be seen.

For a period up to 1973 hourly direct services to London Victoria left from platform 2. By 1978 direct services ran only in peak hours, the fastest taking 98 mins to reach Victoria, slower than the fastest ones taking 81 mins, and off-peak half-hourly 94 mins to London St Pancras International 35 years later, which require a change.

After the withdrawal of the Class 411 4-CEPs, services from August 1998 to December 2006 were operated by the Class 508. From the December 2006 timetable change, the two coach Class 466 were used. In 2019, in order to comply with accessibility requirements, the trains were replaced with Class 375 Electrostars, most commonly the 3-car variants.

== Accidents and incidents ==
- On 26 February 1971, a train formed of five 2HAP electric multiple units overran the buffers and demolished the station building. One person was killed and ten were injured.

== Services ==
All services at Sheerness-on-Sea are operated by Southeastern using Class 375 EMUs.

The typical off-peak service is one train per hour to Sittingbourne, increasing to two trains per hour during the weekday peak hours.

Connections with trains to London Victoria and London St Pancras International can be made by changing at Sittingbourne.

Preceding station	National Rail	Following station
Queenborough	Southeastern Sheerness Line	Terminus
