= Southeastern (train operating company) =

British state-owned train operating company

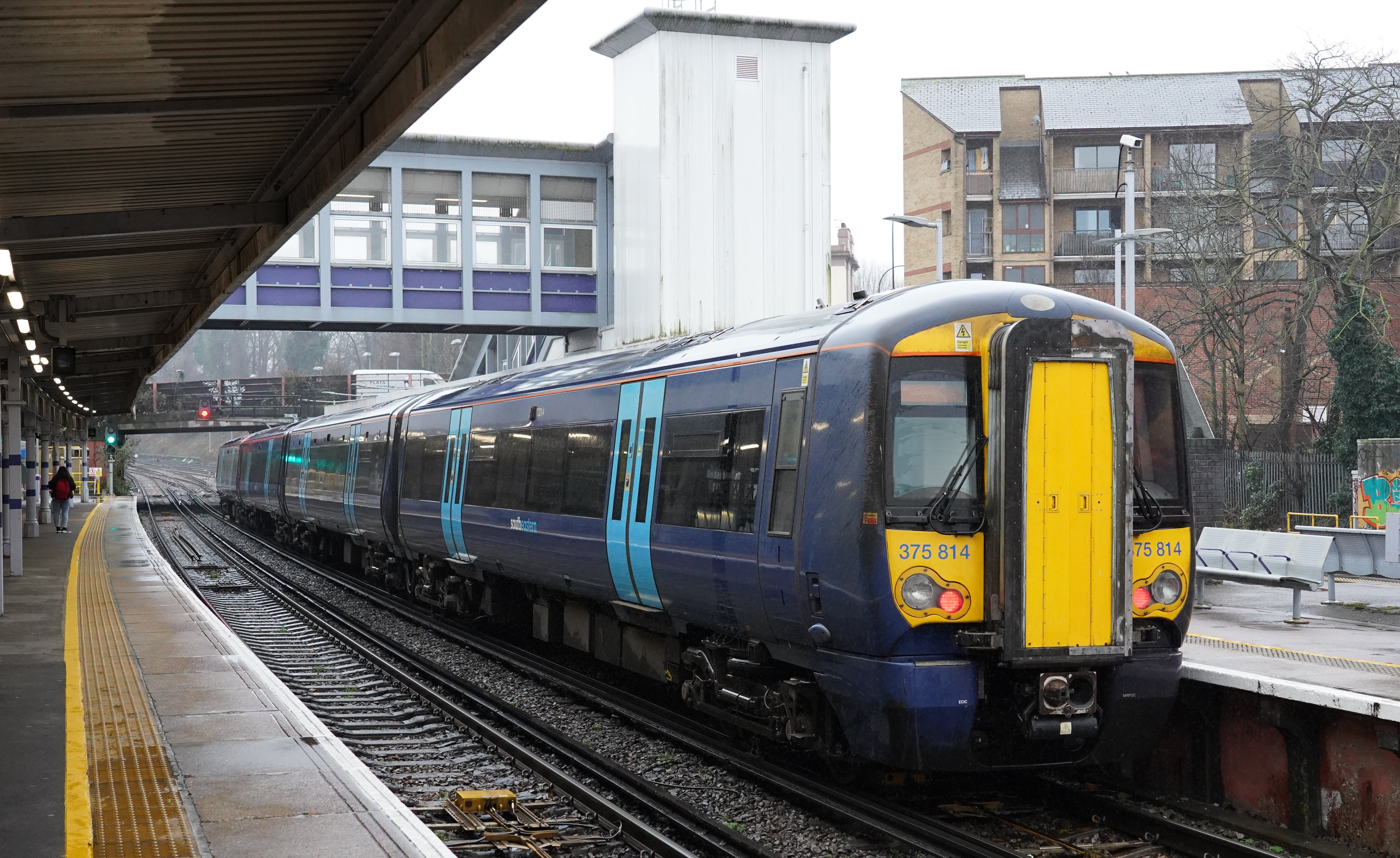
- Southeastern Class 375 Electrostar at New Cross

Overview
- Franchise: South Eastern
- Main regions: Greater London, South East England
- Fleet: Class 375 Electrostar; Class 376 Electrostar; Class 377 Electrostar; Class 395 Javelin; Class 465 Networker; Class 466 Networker; Class 707 City Beam
- Stations called at: 180
- Stations operated: 164
- Parent company: DfT Operator
- Headquarters: London
- Reporting mark: SE
- Dates of operation: 17 October 2021–17 October 2027
- Predecessor: London & South Eastern Railway

Other
- Website: www.southeasternrailway.co.uk
Route map

Map of the Southeastern network

SE Trains Limited, trading as Southeastern and GBR South Eastern, is a state-owned British train operating company in the south east of England. It operates services to destinations in Kent, London and East Sussex, including the domestic services on High Speed 1.

It is owned by DfT Operator, which took over operating the South Eastern franchise from privately owned London & South Eastern Railway (which also traded as Southeastern) on 17 October 2021.

== History ==
In September 2021 the Department for Transport (DfT) announced it would be terminating the South Eastern franchise then operated by the Govia-owned London & South Eastern Railway after revenue declaration discrepancies involving £25 million of public money were discovered. On 17 October 2021, an operator of last resort (OLR), SE Trains Limited, took over operations under the Southeastern brand; at the time, the DfT stated the OLR would manage the franchise for a six-year period.

Southeastern has been one of several train operators affected by the 2022–2023 United Kingdom railway strikes, the first national rail strikes in the UK in three decades. Its workers are amongst those who are participating in industrial action due to a dispute over pay and working conditions. These actions have led to Southeastern occasionally being unable to provide a full service level, and due to the often abrupt nature of the industrial action, which has included overtime bans and strikes, has sometimes not been able to arrange for rail replacement buses in time.

On 1 June 2023, both e-scooters and electric skateboards were banned from being carried onboard Southeastern trains; the reason for the ban was that the lithium-ion batteries that power these compact vehicles posed a fire safety risk. Most electric bicycles may still be taken on board, however. Over the summer of 2023, Southeastern opened several new secure cycle hubs at railway stations across Kent as part of wider efforts to make its stations more accessible to cyclists. These additions came amid a £4.4 million station improvement programme covering both Kent and south-east London, headed by both Southeastern and Network Rail.

In late 2023, Southeastern introduced digital season tickets, referred to as sTickets, enabling customers to purchase and store season tickets on their smartphones. They can be bought through Southeastern's website as well as its mobile application, incorporate anti-fraud measures, and are valid for travel across south-east London, Kent, and East Sussex. Several other fare changes were made around this time, including the abolition of some super off-peak tickets and various price rises. Around the same time, Southeastern scrapped plans to close many of its staffed ticket offices across its network.

In June 2025, as part of the preparations for establishing Great British Railways (GBR) as the new overarching body responsible for rail infrastructure and operations, state-owned Southeastern and Network Rail (Kent area) unified their operations as South Eastern Railway.

== Overview ==
Southeastern serves the main London stations of Charing Cross, Waterloo East, Cannon Street, London Bridge, St Pancras, Victoria and Blackfriars. The network has route mileage of 540 miles (870 km), covering 180 stations, 164 of which it manages.

== Routes ==
Upon its takeover of the franchise, Southeastern initially operated the same routes and services as its predecessor. During December 2022, a new timetable was introduced that reportedly aimed to reduce congestion, improve reliability and better match demand following the COVID-19 pandemic. One year later, it was announced that Southeastern was to put on an additional 100 trains per week as a result of timetable changes based on customer feedback and travel pattern analysis across Kent, East Sussex and south-east London.

Several parties have called for the transfer of Southeastern's metro services to Transport for London (TfL). Prior to the OLR taking over operations, TfL itself had announced its intention to take over the London suburban parts of the franchise and integrate them into a wider metro network. Officials such as the Mayor of London Sadiq Khan have publicly supported this move.

As of December 2024, the weekday off-peak service pattern, with frequencies in trains per hour (tph), is:

High Speed 1
| Route | tph | Calling at |
|---|---|---|
| London St Pancras International to Faversham | 1 | Stratford International, Ebbsfleet International, Gravesend, Strood, Rochester, Chatham, Gillingham, Rainham, Sittingbourne |
| London St Pancras International to Ramsgate via Faversham | 1 | Stratford International, Ebbsfleet International, Gravesend, Strood, Rochester, Chatham, Gillingham, Rainham, Sittingbourne, Faversham, Whitstable, Herne Bay, Birchington-on-Sea, Margate, Broadstairs |
| London St Pancras International to Ramsgate via Dover Priory | 1 | Stratford International, Ebbsfleet International, Ashford International, Folkestone West, Folkestone Central, Dover Priory, Martin Mill, Walmer, Deal, Sandwich |
| London St Pancras International to Margate via Canterbury West | 1 | Stratford International, Ebbsfleet International, Ashford International, Canterbury West, Thanet Parkway, Ramsgate, Broadstairs |
Chatham Main Line
| Route | tph | Calling at |
| London Victoria to Ramsgate via Faversham | 1 | Bromley South, Longfield (London-bound only), Meopham (London-bound only), Rochester, Chatham, Gillingham, Rainham, Sittingbourne, Faversham, Whitstable, Chestfield & Swalecliffe, Herne Bay, Birchington-on-Sea, Westgate-on-Sea, Margate, Broadstairs, Dumpton Park |
| London Victoria to Dover Priory via Faversham | 1 | Bromley South, Longfield (Dover-bound only), Meopham (Dover-bound only), Rochester, Chatham, Gillingham, Rainham, Newington, Sittingbourne, Teynham, Faversham, Selling, Canterbury East, Bekesbourne, Adisham, Aylesham, Snowdown, Shepherds Well, Kearsney |
| London Victoria to Gillingham | 1 | Denmark Hill, Bromley South, St Mary Cray, Swanley, Farningham Road, Longfield, Meopham, Sole Street, Rochester, Chatham |
| Sittingbourne to Sheerness-on-Sea | 1 | Kemsley, Swale, Queenborough |
Maidstone Line
| Route | tph | Calling at |
| London Victoria to Ashford International via Maidstone East | 1 | Bromley South, St Mary Cray, Swanley, Otford, Kemsing, Borough Green & Wrotham, West Malling, East Malling, Barming, Maidstone East, Bearsted, Hollingbourne, Harrietsham, Lenham, Charing |
| London Charing Cross to Maidstone East (semi-fast) | 1 | Waterloo East, London Bridge, Swanley, Otford, Borough Green & Wrotham, West Malling |
South Eastern Main Line
| Route | tph | Calling at |
| London Charing Cross to Dover Priory | 1 | Waterloo East, London Bridge, Sevenoaks, Tonbridge, Paddock Wood, Marden, Staplehurst, Headcorn, Ashford International, Westenhanger, Sandling, Folkestone West, Folkestone Central |
| London Charing Cross to Ramsgate via Canterbury West | 1 | Waterloo East, London Bridge, Sevenoaks, Tonbridge, Paddock Wood, Marden, Staplehurst, Headcorn, Pluckley, Ashford International, Wye, Chilham, Chartham, Canterbury West, Sturry, Minster, Thanet Parkway |
Hastings Line
| Route | tph | Calling at |
| London Charing Cross to Hastings | 2 | Waterloo East, London Bridge, Orpington, Sevenoaks, Hildenborough (1 tph), Tonbridge, High Brooms, Tunbridge Wells, Frant (1 tph), Wadhurst, Stonegate (1 tph), Etchingham (1 tph), Robertsbridge (1 tph), Battle, Crowhurst (1 tph), West St Leonards (1 tph), St Leonards Warrior Square; Hildenborough, Frant, Stonegate, Etchingham, Robertsbridge, Crowhurst, and West St Leonards are all served by the same trains. |
Medway Valley Line
| Route | tph | Calling at |
| Strood to Paddock Wood via Maidstone West | 2 | Cuxton, Halling, Snodland, New Hythe, Aylesford, Maidstone Barracks, Maidstone West, East Farleigh, Wateringbury, Yalding, Beltring |
Metro - North Kent Line
| Route | tph | Calling at |
| London Cannon Street to London Cannon Street via Greenwich and Woolwich Arsenal (clockwise) | 2 | London Bridge, Deptford, Greenwich, Maze Hill, Westcombe Park, Charlton, Woolwich Dockyard, Woolwich Arsenal, Plumstead, Abbey Wood, Belvedere, Erith, Slade Green; Services continue to/from London Cannon Street via Bexleyheath (see below). |
| London Cannon Street to Dartford via Lewisham and Woolwich Arsenal | 2 | London Bridge, New Cross, St Johns, Lewisham, Blackheath, Charlton, Woolwich Dockyard, Woolwich Arsenal, Plumstead, Abbey Wood, Belvedere, Erith, Slade Green |
Metro - Bexleyheath Line
| Route | tph | Calling at |
| London Cannon Street to London Cannon Street via Bexleyheath (anticlockwise) | 2 | London Bridge, New Cross, St Johns, Lewisham, Blackheath, Kidbrooke, Eltham, Falconwood, Welling, Bexleyheath, Barnehurst, Slade Green; Services continue to/from London Cannon Street via Woolwich Arsenal and Greenwich (see above). |
| London Victoria to Gravesend via Bexleyheath | 2 | Denmark Hill, Peckham Rye, Nunhead, Lewisham, Blackheath, Kidbrooke, Eltham, Falconwood, Welling, Bexleyheath, Barnehurst, Dartford, Greenhithe |
| London Charing Cross to Dartford via Bexleyheath | 1 | Waterloo East, London Bridge, Lewisham, Blackheath, Kidbrooke, Eltham, Falconwood, Welling, Bexleyheath, Barnehurst |
Metro - Sidcup Line
| Route | tph | Calling at |
| London Charing Cross to Dartford via Lewisham and Sidcup | 2 | Waterloo East, London Bridge, Lewisham, Hither Green, Lee, Mottingham, New Eltham, Sidcup, Albany Park, Bexley, Crayford |
| London Charing Cross to Gravesend via Sidcup | 2 | Waterloo East, London Bridge, Hither Green, Lee, Mottingham, New Eltham, Sidcup, Albany Park, Bexley, Crayford, Dartford, Stone Crossing, Greenhithe, Swanscombe, Northfleet |
Metro - South Eastern Main Line
| Route | tph | Calling at |
| London Cannon Street to Orpington via Grove Park | 2 | London Bridge, New Cross, St Johns, Hither Green, Grove Park, Elmstead Woods, Chislehurst, Petts Wood |
| London Charing Cross to Sevenoaks via Grove Park | 2 | Waterloo East, London Bridge, Lewisham, Hither Green, Grove Park, Elmstead Woods, Chislehurst, Petts Wood, Orpington, Chelsfield, Knockholt, Dunton Green |
| Grove Park to Bromley North | 2 | Sundridge Park |
Metro - Hayes Line
| Route | tph | Calling at |
| London Charing Cross to Hayes | 4 | Waterloo East, London Bridge, Lewisham (2 tph), Ladywell, Catford Bridge, Lower Sydenham, New Beckenham, Clock House, Elmers End, Eden Park, West Wickham |
Metro - Chatham Main Line
| Route | tph | Calling at |
| London Victoria to Orpington via Beckenham Junction | 4 | Brixton, Herne Hill, West Dulwich, Sydenham Hill, Penge East, Kent House, Beckenham Junction, Shortlands, Bromley South, Bickley, Petts Wood |

== Rolling stock ==
At the commencement of operations, Southeastern retained the same electric multiple units as its predecessor. It promptly launched a refurbishment programme covering most of its existing rolling stock; £27 million alone was allocated to the refurbishment of its 29 [Class 395 Javelin high-speed trains. By May 2023, Southeastern had reportedly completed work on half of its 112-strong Class 375 Electrostar fleet under a £10 million upgrade programme; internal changes included the addition of new USB ports, at-seat electrical sockets, LED lighting, and energy meters.

The previous franchisee had finalised a leasing arrangement for the entire Class 707 fleet and was in the process of launching the type into service when the OLR took over. Southeastern has continued this deal, thus the remainder of the 30 Class 707s shall enter service as they are released by South Western Railway.

Various initiatives have been explored to improve train performance, capabilities and effectiveness. Southeastern formed a team with Siemens Mobility and Eversholt Rail to jointly develop a fully automated vehicle inspection system to inspect its vehicles; this technology, which uses numerous high sensitivity cameras and optical laser sensors, is to be first used at the operator's Ramsgate depot, and will be active from 2025.

Southeastern has also examined the prospects for replacing older portions of its train fleet. In November 2022, the operator launched the process of procuring new trains via the issuing of a tender. Southeastern has sought between 350 and 640 new carriages for its services; these are projected to be introduced sometime during the mid-2020s.

In November 2024 it was announced that in the period between December 2024 and December 2025, Southeastern would be set to receive 13 Class 377/1s (377121–133) from Southern to replace ageing Class 465 units, being made available by a movement of out-of-service Class 379 units and Class 387/1 units to support Govia Thameslink Railway services.

=== Current fleet ===
| Family | Class | Image | Type | Top speed | | Number | Carriages | Routes operated | Built |
| Family | Class | Image | Type | mph | km/h | Number | Carriages | Routes operated | Built |
|---|---|---|---|---|---|---|---|---|---|
| Bombardier Electrostar | 375/3 | | EMU | 100 | 160 | 10 | 3 | Main line routes | 1999–2005 |
| Bombardier Electrostar | 375/6 | | EMU | 100 | 160 | 30 | 4 | Main line routes | 1999–2005 |
| Bombardier Electrostar | 375/7 | | EMU | 100 | 160 | 15 | 4 | Main line routes | 1999–2005 |
| Bombardier Electrostar | 375/8 | | EMU | 100 | 160 | 30 | 4 | Main line routes | 1999–2005 |
| Bombardier Electrostar | 375/9 | | EMU | 100 | 160 | 27 | 4 | Main line routes | 1999–2005 |
| Bombardier Electrostar | 376 | | EMU | 75 | 120 | 36 | 5 | Metro routes | 2004–2005 |
| Bombardier Electrostar | 377/1 | | EMU | 100 | 160 | 9 | 4 | Main line routes | 2002–2003 |
| Bombardier Electrostar | 377/5 | | EMU | 100 | 160 | 23 | 4 | Main line routes | 2008–2009 |
| Hitachi AT300 | 395 Javelin | | EMU | 140 | 225 | 29 | 6 | High Speed 1 services | 2007–2009 |
| Networker | 465/0 | | EMU | 75 | 120 | 50 | 4 | Main line and metro routes | 1991–1994 |
| Networker | 465/1 | | EMU | 75 | 120 | 47 | 4 | Main line and metro routes | 1991–1994 |
| Networker | 465/9 | | EMU | 75 | 120 | 25 | 4 | Main line and metro routes | 1991–1994 |
| Networker | 466 | | EMU | 75 | 120 | 16 | 2 | Main line and metro routes | 1993–1994 |
| Siemens Desiro | 707 City Beam | | EMU | 100 | 160 | 30 | 5 | Metro routes | 2015–2018 |

=== Past fleet ===
In May 2022, two Class 377/1 units were transferred from Southeastern back to Southern.

| Family | Class | Image | Type | Top speed | | Number | Carriages | Routes operated | Year withdrawn |
| Family | Class | Image | Type | mph | km/h | Number | Carriages | Routes operated | Year withdrawn |
|---|---|---|---|---|---|---|---|---|---|
| Bombardier Electrostar | 377 | | EMU | 100 | 160 | 2 | 4 | Main line routes | 2022 |

=== Future fleet ===
In May 2024 Southeastern issued a tender for 350 to 640 new carriages to replace the Class 465 and 466 units. CAF, Hitachi, Stadler, Siemens and Alstom are currently bidding for the tender of new fleets.

| Preceded by London & South Eastern Railway | Operator of South Eastern franchise 2021–2027 | Succeeded by Incumbent |
