= Gillingham railway station (Kent) =

British railway station in Kent

Gillingham
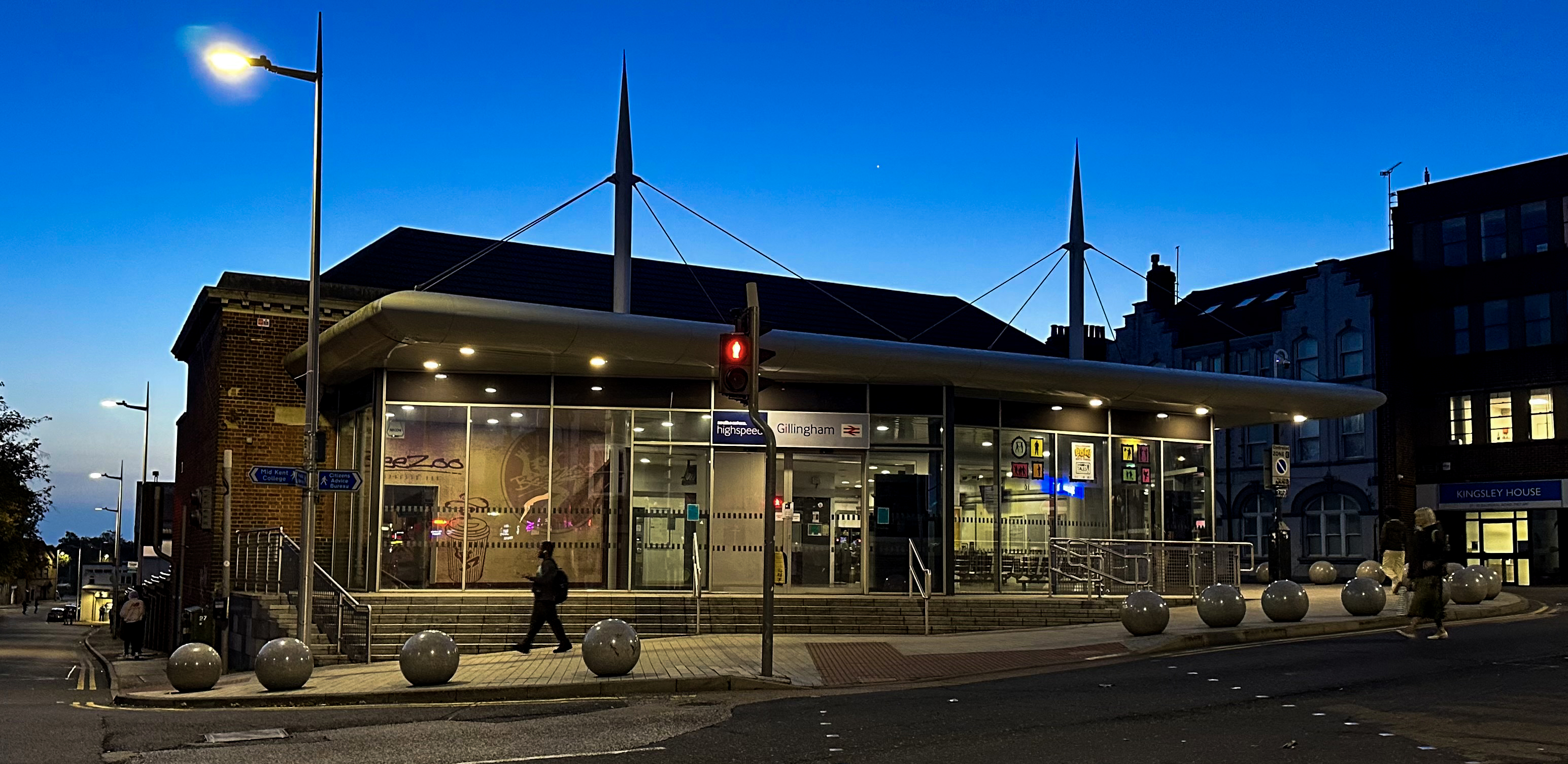
- The station entrance photographed on 5 October 2025.

General information
- Location: Gillingham, Borough of Medway; England
- Coordinates: 51.386569°N 0.549886°E
- Grid reference: TQ775683
- Managed by: Southeastern
- Platforms: 3

Other information
- Station code: GLM
- Classification: DfT category C1

Key dates
- July 1858: Opened as New Brompton
- May 1886: Renamed New Brompton (Gillingham)
- 1 Oct 1912: Renamed Gillingham

Passengers
- 2020/21: ▼0.940 million
- Interchange: ▼45,372
- 2021/22: ▲1.861 million
- Interchange: ▲0.107 million
- 2022/23: ▲2.120 million
- Interchange: ▲0.602 million
- 2023/24: ▲2.342 million
- Interchange: ▼0.114 million
- 2024/25: ▲2.542 million
- Interchange: ▲0.137 million
Location
Notes
- Passenger statistics from the Office of Rail and Road

Gillingham railway station is on the Chatham Main Line in England, serving the town of Gillingham, Kent. It is 35 miles 75 chains (57.8 km) down the line from London Victoria and is situated between Chatham and Rainham.

The station and most trains that call are operated by Southeastern. Following a timetable change on 20 May 2018, some trains are also operated by Govia Thameslink. It is commonly suffixed as Gillingham (Kent) to distinguish it from the similarly named station in Dorset.

The station first opened in 1858. It currently has three platforms (two for London-bound services and one for country-bound services) and a passenger lift from the station entrance to the platforms.

The station underwent an extensive facelift between 2010 and 2012. This included a new entrance, better pavements, new roof, refurbished waiting rooms, and new cycle storage units.

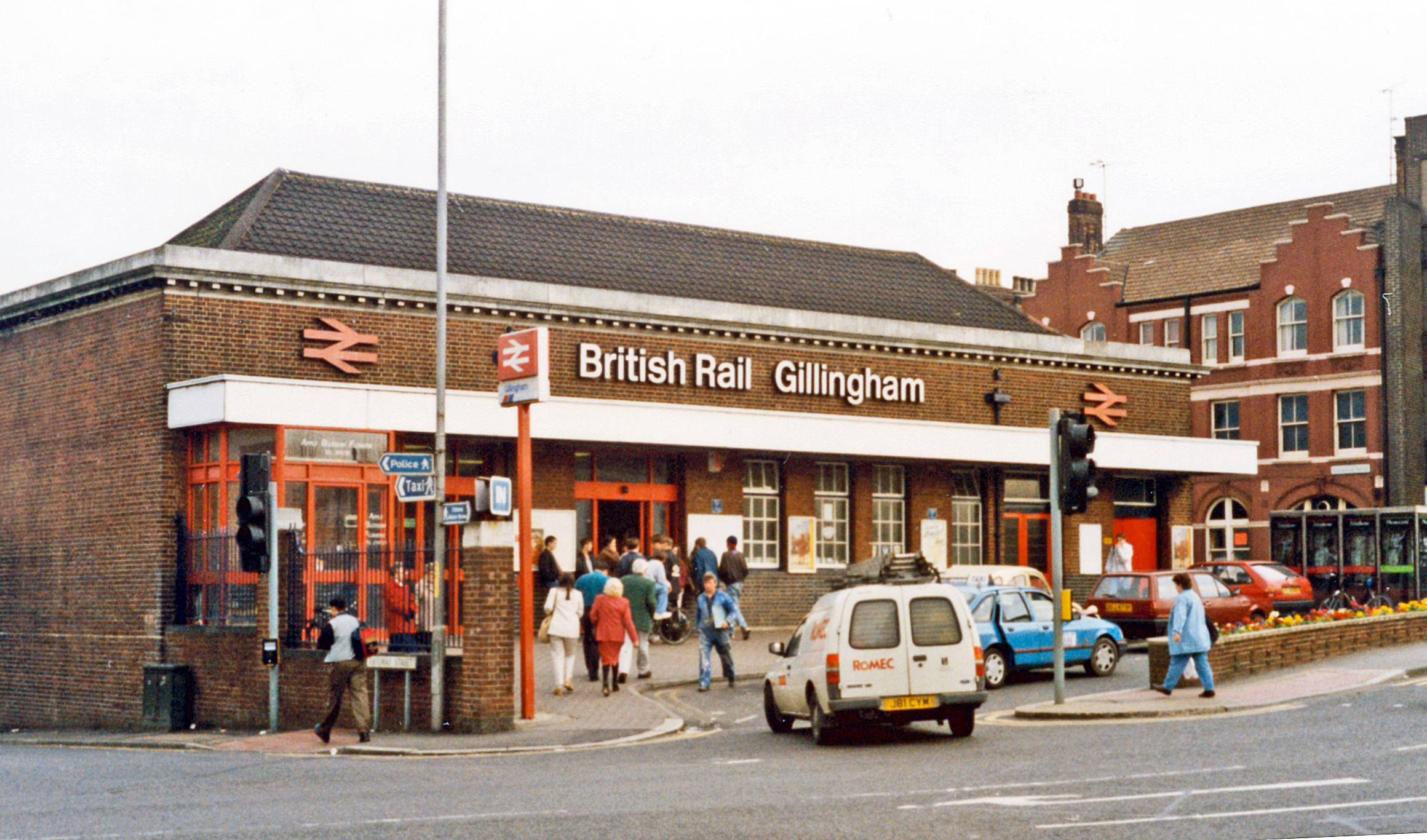
The original station entrance in 1995

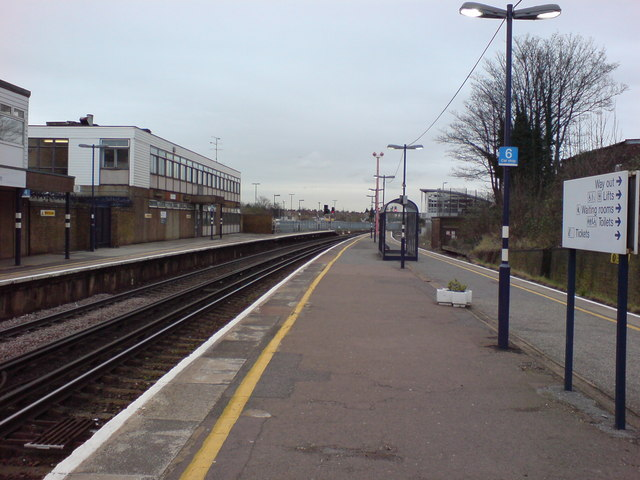
Looking coastbound. The building on the left is a train crew depot, locally known as “Traincrew Accommodation Block B”

== Services ==
Services at Gillingham are operated by Southeastern and Thameslink using Class 375, 377, 395, 465, 466 and 700 EMUs.

The typical off-peak service in trains per hour is:

- 2 tph to London St Pancras International
- 3 tph to London Victoria (2 of these run non-stop from Bromley South and 1 runs via Denmark Hill)
- 2 tph to Luton via Dartford and Greenwich
- 2 tph to Rainham
- 1 tph to Faversham
- 1 tph to Dover Priory via Canterbury East
- 2 tph to Ramsgate

Additional services, including trains to and from London Charing Cross via Sidcup, and fast trains to and from London Cannon Street call at the station during the peak hours.

Preceding station	National Rail	Following station
Chatham	Southeastern Chatham Main Line	Rainham or Terminus
Chatham	Southeastern High Speed 1	Rainham
Chatham	Thameslink North Kent Line	Rainham
Chatham	Southeastern North Kent Line Peak Hours Only	Terminus

=== Vending facilities ===
Vending machines operated by Decorum Vending have been installed at the station since October 2022. The machines are located on Platforms 1, 2, and 3.
