= Wye railway station =

Railway station in Kent, England

Coordinates: 51.185°N 0.929°E

Wye
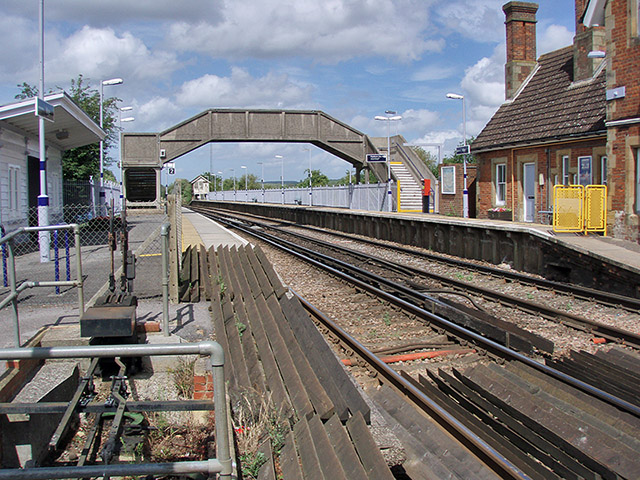

General information
- Location: Wye, Ashford; England
- Grid reference: TR048469
- Manager: Southeastern
- Platforms: 2

Other information
- Station code: WYE
- Classification: DfT category E

History
- Opened: 6 February 1846

Passengers
- 2020/21: ▼77,282
- 2021/22: ▲0.169 million
- 2022/23: ▲0.185 million
- 2023/24: ▲0.202 million
- 2024/25: ▲0.229 million
Location
Notes
- Passenger statistics from the Office of Rail and Road

Wye railway station serves Wye in Kent, England, on the Ashford to Ramsgate line. The station and all trains that serve the station are operated by Southeastern.

== History ==
The first plan for a station near Wye was in 1812, when John Rennie the Elder proposed building a canal to connect the River Medway in North Kent with the River Rother in East Sussex. A tramway would connect Wye to the canal. The proposal was abandoned in favour of through railways.

The station was opened by the South Eastern Railway in 1846, along with the rest of the line from Ashford to Canterbury West. It was a constructed next to a level crossing with the main road, on the grounds that Parliament believed trains would not be frequent. A crane for goods traffic was installed in 1852. The station began serving local gravel goods traffic in 1919. Freight facilities were closed on 10 June 1963.

== Racecourse station ==
On the opposite side of the level crossing a separate station was opened in March 1882 to serve the racecourse. It was closed in May 1974 (with the last horse racing meeting) and subsequently demolished.

== Facilities ==
The platforms were connected by a concrete footbridge in 1960. This was replaced with a 12.5-metre (41 ft) steel footbridge in 2015. The staffed level crossing at the south end of the station required manual operation of the gates and was formerly a local traffic bottleneck but was replaced with automated crossing gates in December 2022.

The station is staffed for part of the day. There is a passenger-operated ticket machine located on the Ashford-bound platform, by the footbridge.

The station buildings on the Ashford-bound platform contain the booking office. There is a shelter on the Canterbury-bound platform.

== Services ==
All services at Wye are operated by Southeastern using Class 375 EMUs.

The typical off-peak service in trains per hour is:

- 1 tph to London Charing Cross via Tonbridge
- 1 tph to Ramsgate

Additional services, including trains to and from London Cannon Street and London St Pancras International call at the station during the peak hours.

Preceding station	National Rail	Following station
Ashford International	Southeastern Ashford to Ramsgate Line	Chilham
