= Chatham Main Line =

Railway line in south-east England

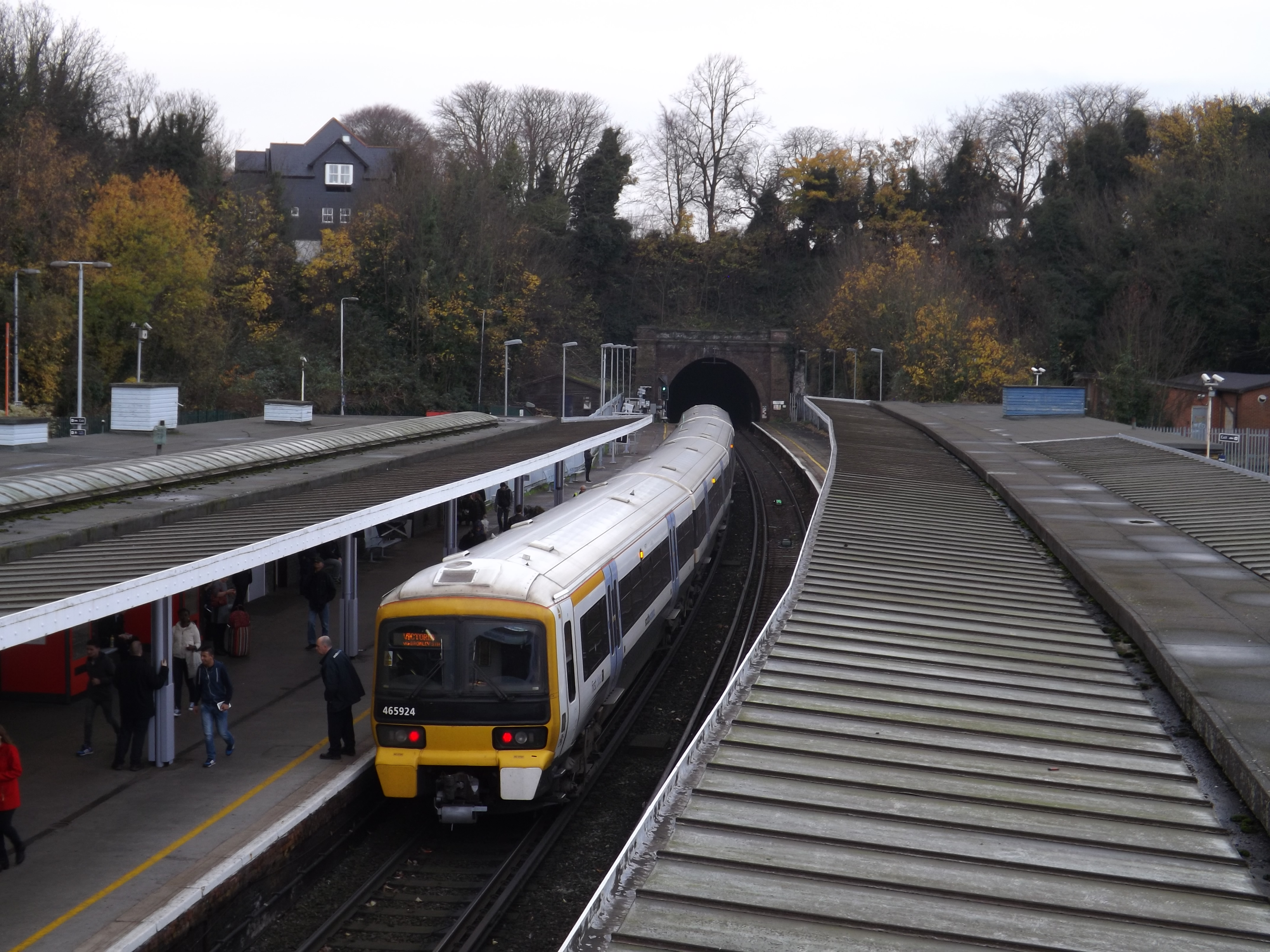
- Southeastern Class 465/9 Networker at Chatham in 2015

Overview
- Status: Operational
- Owner: Network Rail
- Locale: Greater London; South East England
- Termini: London Victoria; Ramsgate Dover Priory
- Stations: 40

Service
- Type: Commuter rail, Heavy rail
- System: National Rail
- Operator(s): Southeastern; Thameslink
- Depot(s): Gillingham EMUD, Ramsgate EMUD, Grovesnor Carriage Shed
- Rolling stock: Class 375 "Electrostar"; Class 377 "Electrostar"; Class 395 "Javelin"; Class 465 "Networker"; Class 466 "Networker"; Class 700 "Desiro City"

History
- Opened: 1860-1863

Technical
- Line length: 116 mi 63 ch (187.95 km) (Includes both branches down from Faversham)
- Number of tracks: Mainly 2, 3 between London Victoria and Voltaire Jn and 4 between Shortlands Jn and Swanley Jn
- Track gauge: 4 ft 8 1/2 in (1,435 mm) standard gauge
- Electrification: 750 V DC third rail
- Operating speed: 145 km/h (90 mph)
Route map
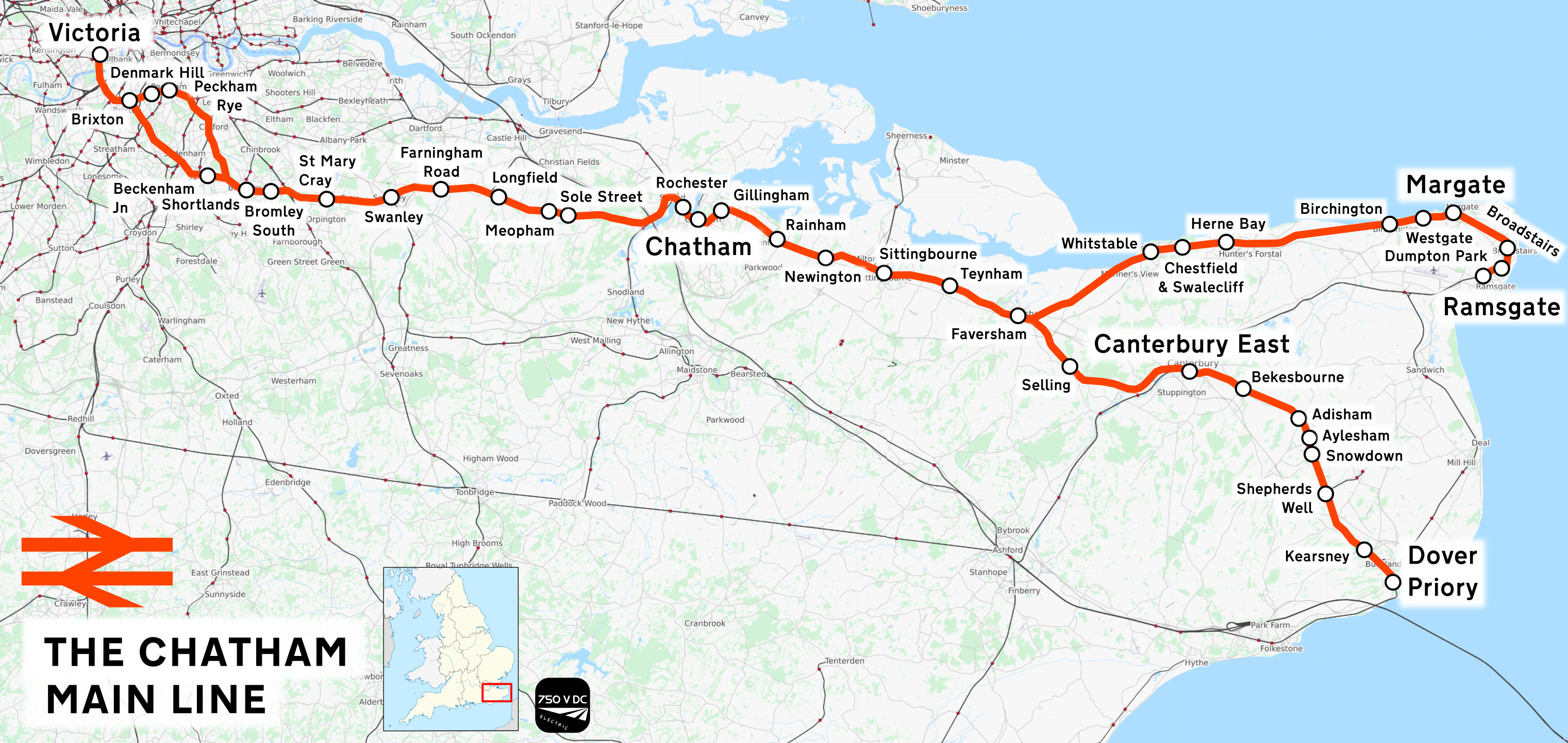
(Click to expand)

The Chatham Main Line is a railway line in England between London Victoria, and Dover Priory and Ramsgate, travelling via the Medway towns (of which the town of Chatham is part, hence the name).

Services to Cannon Street follow the route as far as St Mary Cray Junction where they diverge onto the South Eastern Main Line near Chislehurst.

Thameslink services to Luton run in parallel from Rainham to Rochester, diverging once across the River Medway at Rochester Bridge Junction onto the North Kent Line via Gravesend and Dartford.

A shuttle service operates on the Sheerness Line which starts at Sittingbourne.

== Services ==
Most services on the Line are run by Southeastern and Southern. Govia Thameslink Railway run some Thameslink services, the first starting from London Blackfriars and travelling via Denmark Hill on the Catford Loop, joining at Shortlands Junction, travelling to Swanley before heading to Sevenoaks. The second service starts from Kentish Town and also travels via the Catford Loop to Shortlands Junction, travelling to Bickley before heading off to Orpington. The final service starts at Luton and goes via London Bridge, Greenwich, Dartford and Gravesend to Rochester before terminating at Rainham in the bay platform 0.

While travelling between Bromley South and London Victoria, the trains can either travel on the main line, through Beckenham Junction, Herne Hill and Brixton, or via the Catford Loop Line, coming away from the main line at Shortlands Junction, travelling through Catford and Peckham Rye, and then just past Brixton it either picks up the Southeastern line all the way, or can follow the Southern (Atlantic) Line through Clapham High Street before crossing back over to the Southeastern Line to London Victoria. The hourly stopping service is now scheduled to run via Catford, additionally stopping at Denmark Hill.

The off-peak timetable consists of two trains per hour from Victoria, calling at Bromley South, Longfield, Meopham, Rochester, Chatham, Gillingham and Rainham. One service will call at Newington, Sittingbourne, Teynham and Faversham, then all stations to Dover Priory via Canterbury East. The other service will just call at Sittingbourne and Faversham, then all stations to Margate and Ramsgate. These trains no longer split up at Faversham. There is an hourly service from Victoria calling at Denmark Hill via the Catford Loop, Bromley South, St Mary Cray then all stations to Gillingham. A High Speed Service sees two trains per hour from St Pancras International to Faversham via Gravesend and Chatham. One service terminates at Faversham before travelling back to St Pancras International via Chatham and Gravesend. The other service continues coastbound as a semi-fast service calling at Whitstable, Herne Bay, Birchington, Margate, Broadstairs and Ramsgate. It then carries on, stopping at Sandwich, Deal, Walmer, Martin Mill, Dover Priory, Folkestone Central, Folkestone West and Ashford International, before picking up the High Speed Line to Ebbsfleet International, Stratford International and arriving back at St Pancras International. A service operates in the opposite direction. There is one other High Speed Service that runs on a small part of the line, starting from Margate and calling at Broadstairs and Ramsgate before heading to Canterbury West, and Ashford International, then picking up the High Speed Line and calling at the remaining stations to St Pancras International. A Thameslink service now starts from Rainham and calls at nearly all stations via Strood, Gravesend, Dartford, Abbey Wood (for Elizabeth line services), Woolwich Arsenal and Greenwich (both for the Docklands Light Railway), London Bridge, Blackfriars and beyond. Passengers for Waterloo East, Charing Cross or Cannon Street now have to change at London Bridge.

== Rolling stock ==
The following trains are operated on the line : Class 465 "Networker" since 1992, Class 466 "Networker" since 1993, Class 375 "Electrostar" since 2001, Class 395 "Javelin" since 2009, and 8-car Class 700 "Desiro City" since 2018.

== History ==
The line was built by the London, Chatham and Dover Railway, who were in competition with the South Eastern Railway (hence the duplication of stations in Kent). They subsequently built lines to Sevenoaks and Ashford (via Maidstone) from the Chatham Main Line.

The line was electrified (750 V DC third rail) in a series of stages. Initially the new Southern Railway electrified the urban (within London) workings of the SECR in the 1920s. In July 1925 "South Eastern Electrification (Stage 1)" saw the line from Victoria to junction with the South Eastern Main Line at Bickley, including the Catford Loop Line electrified. This was extended to outer suburban workings to Sevenoaks via Swanley (Bickley junction to Swanley) in two stages, reaching St Mary Cray in May 1934 and Swanley in January 1935. Full outer suburban electrification was achieved with the "Maidstone & Gillingham Electrification" scheme in July 1939, extending electrification from Swanley to Gillingham. Post war, under the BR's 1955 Modernisation plan, electrification was completed (Gillingham to Ramsgate and Dover) under "Kent Coast Electrification" stage 1 in 1959. At the same time the four track section between Shortlands and St Mary Cray junction was extended to Swanley Junction with a complete rebuilding of the St Mary Cray Junction. Two passing loops were added (to create a four-track section) between Rainham and Newington.

A short branch was built during World War One to service the construction of RAF Manston with a junction off the up line at Birchington on Sea.

== Former use by Eurostar ==
Heading away from London Victoria, between Farningham Road and Longfield Stations, the connecting branch line which was originally used by Eurostar trains travelling from Waterloo International via Fawkham Junction to access High Speed 1 still exists, but is currently unused.

At one time, this line was reserved for emergency use only by Class 395 Javelins travelling to/from Ashford International but, as the route knowledge has not been updated, no trains currently use this line.

The Eurostar trains can no longer use this line as the Class 373 "Eurostar e300" trains had their 750V DC third rail shoes removed in 2007, whilst the new Class 374 "Eurostar e320" trains have not been fitted with UK third rail equipment, and are also built to the Continental European loading gauge, which is larger than that of Great Britain.

== East Kent re-signalling project ==
The idea of this project is for control of East Kent from Longfield to Ramsgate and just short of Dover Priory to be under the control of the East Kent Signalling Centre (EKSC) based at Gillingham.

Phase 1 of the project was carried out over the Christmas and New Year period of 2011, which involved the complete re-signalling from just east of Sittingbourne to Faversham, then on to Minster Junction and Buckland Junction, just short of Dover Priory. The old signal boxes were then abolished at Faversham, Margate, Ramsgate, Canterbury East and Shepherdswell. Phase 2 involved the re-signalling of the line between Sittingbourne to Longfield and Strood, including the Sheerness Branch Line and the Medway Valley Line to operate from the East Kent Signalling Centre at Gillingham, which is now operational. This means that the Signal Boxes at Rainham and Rochester have now closed, although Sittingbourne remains open as a relay signal box for the Sheerness Branch Line, controlled from Gillingham.

On 13 December 2015, a new £26M Rochester station on Corporation Street opened 500 m west of the original station which it replaced. This station has three platforms and can accommodate 12-car trains instead of the 10-cars maximum length at the original station. Some 12-car peak-time trains are additionally stopping here. At the time, only platforms 1 and 2 were operational. From Easter 2016, Platform 3 was only a Bay Platform with a maximum length of eight cars, but since 10 October 2016, Platform 3 became a through platform with services either able to head towards the Kent Coast or terminating here before head back up towards London. At the East End of the platform, a third line now runs all the way up to the old Rochester Station passing through what was Platform 4 before rejoining the Down Main towards Chatham. This can also enable long freight trains to be held here, allowing passenger services to pass, therefore removing a potential bottleneck.

Rainham has a new bay platform off the up-line, which can accommodate a 12-car train, labelled Platform 0. It was being used temporarily as a Terminus for a couple of evening rush hour trains, but since the introduction of the new Thameslink Metro timetable in 2018, this is now the terminus for services to Luton via Gravesend, Dartford, Woolwich Arsenal and Greenwich, stopping at all but a few stations to London Bridge.

Strood has also been lengthened to accommodate 12-car trains.

== Accidents and incidents ==
- On 10 September 1963, a freight train became divided and was derailed between Farningham Road and Longfield due to defects in a wagon. The line was closed until 13 September.
- The unsolved murder of Deborah Linsley took place in a compartment coach service likely between Penge East and Victoria, possibly around Brixton in 1988.

== See also ==
- South Eastern Main Line
