= Chatham railway station (Kent) =

Railway station in Kent, England

Chatham
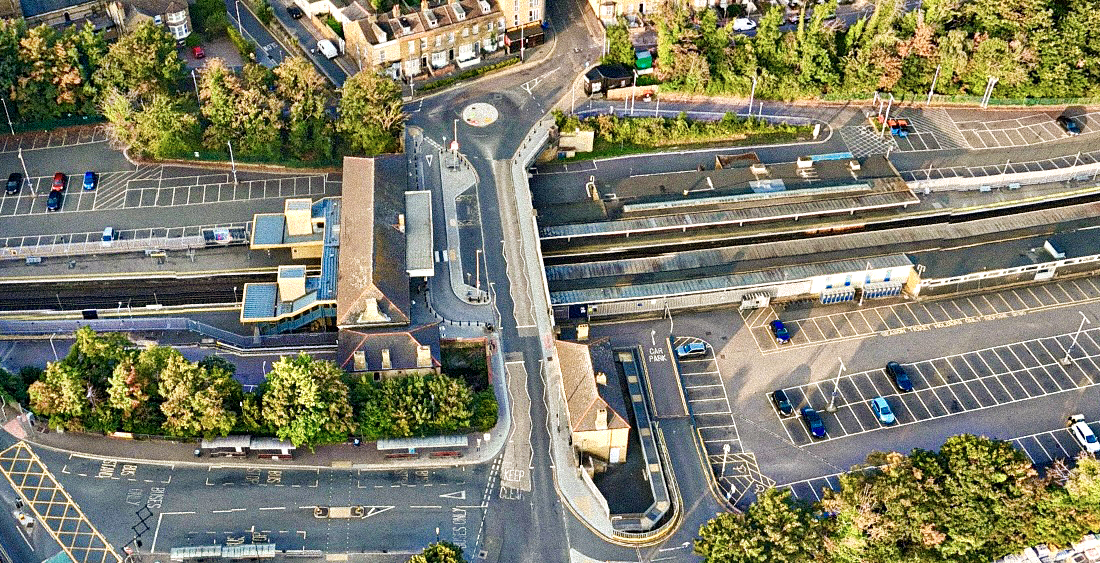
- Aerial view of the station

General information
- Location: Chatham, Borough of Medway, England
- Coordinates: 51.3805°N 0.5205°E
- Grid reference: TQ755676
- Managed by: Southeastern
- Platforms: 2

Other information
- Station code: CTM
- Classification: DfT category C1

History
- Opened: 25 January 1858; 168 years ago

Passengers
- 2020/21: ▼0.826 million
- 2021/22: ▲1.729 million
- 2022/23: ▲2.010 million
- 2023/24: ▲2.173 million
- 2024/25: ▲2.398 million
Location
Notes
- Passenger statistics from the Office of Rail and Road

Chatham railway station serves the town of Chatham, in Kent, England. It lies on the Chatham Main Line, 34 miles 25 chains (55.2 km) from London Victoria; it is situated between Rochester and Gillingham. The station and most trains that call are operated by Southeastern; since 2018, some services are operated by Govia Thameslink Railway.

== History ==
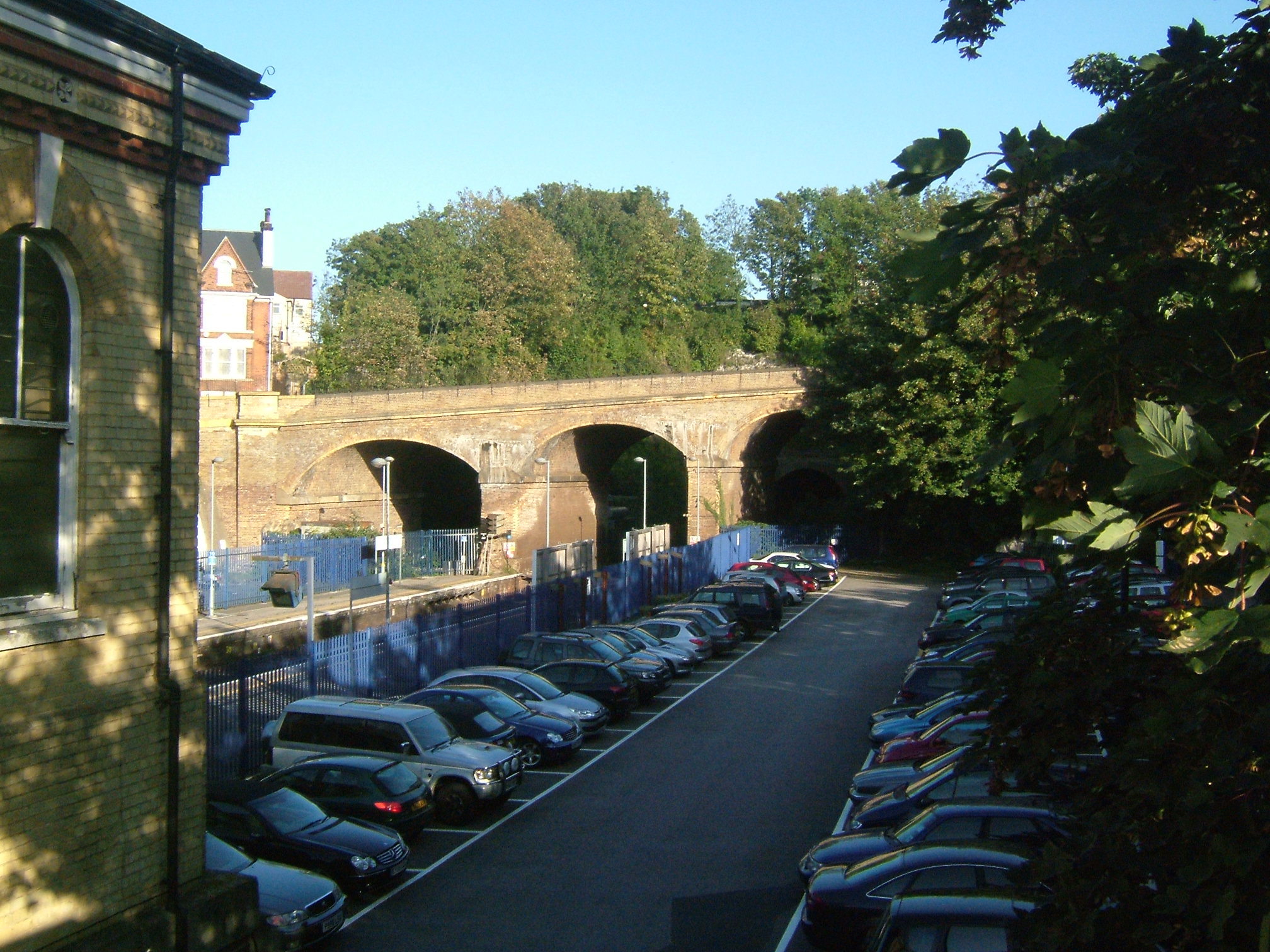
Facing east and showing the Chatham Tunnel and Maidstone Road bridge; this clearly illustrates the effect of the Kent Coast Electrification Scheme. Loop platforms existed on either side of the main line platforms, with the London-bound loop being situated in the foreground where one of the car parks is now (2007)

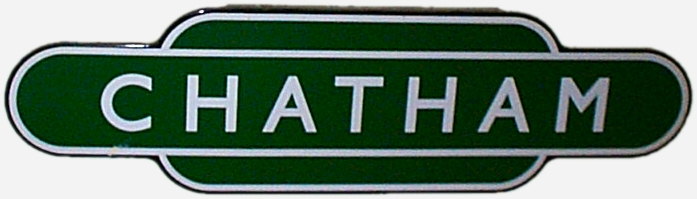
British Railways Southern Region totem sign

The station was opened on 25 January 1858, when the London, Chatham and Dover Railway (LCDR) (then known as the East Kent Railway) opened a single line eastwards to Faversham. Two months later, on 29 March, the link with the North Kent Line at Strood was opened; the new railway reached Dover Priory in 1861. The Chatham Dockyard branch connection is made near Gillingham, though this is now disused and physically disconnected from the main line.

As built, the station had two platforms with the buildings on the down side. A note on the working drawings states that the station had to be visible from Fort Pitt. In about 1881, it was rebuilt with two island platforms and the station buildings were moved onto the road bridge, then known as Rome Place. In 1958, the station was converted back to two platforms, as part of the Kent Coast Electrification Scheme, Stage 1. The line had been electrified in 1939, but the 1958 scheme lengthened the platforms to 12-car electric multiple units, which due to the geography of the station - between two tunnels - necessitated the abandoning of the other platforms.

A modern entrance and booking hall replaced the originals in 1981. Further remodelling in the 1990s and 2000s has seen the ticket office moved twice, accompanied by the opening, closing and reopening of retail areas. A small, general corner store was also opened.

A plaque in the waiting room commemorates Asquith Xavier, a local resident who ended a colour bar at British Railways in London by fighting to become the first non-white train guard at London Euston in 1966.

== Facilities ==
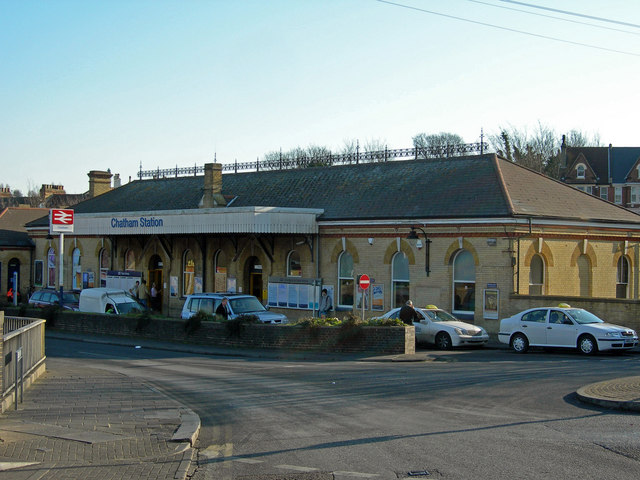
The station entrance (2008)

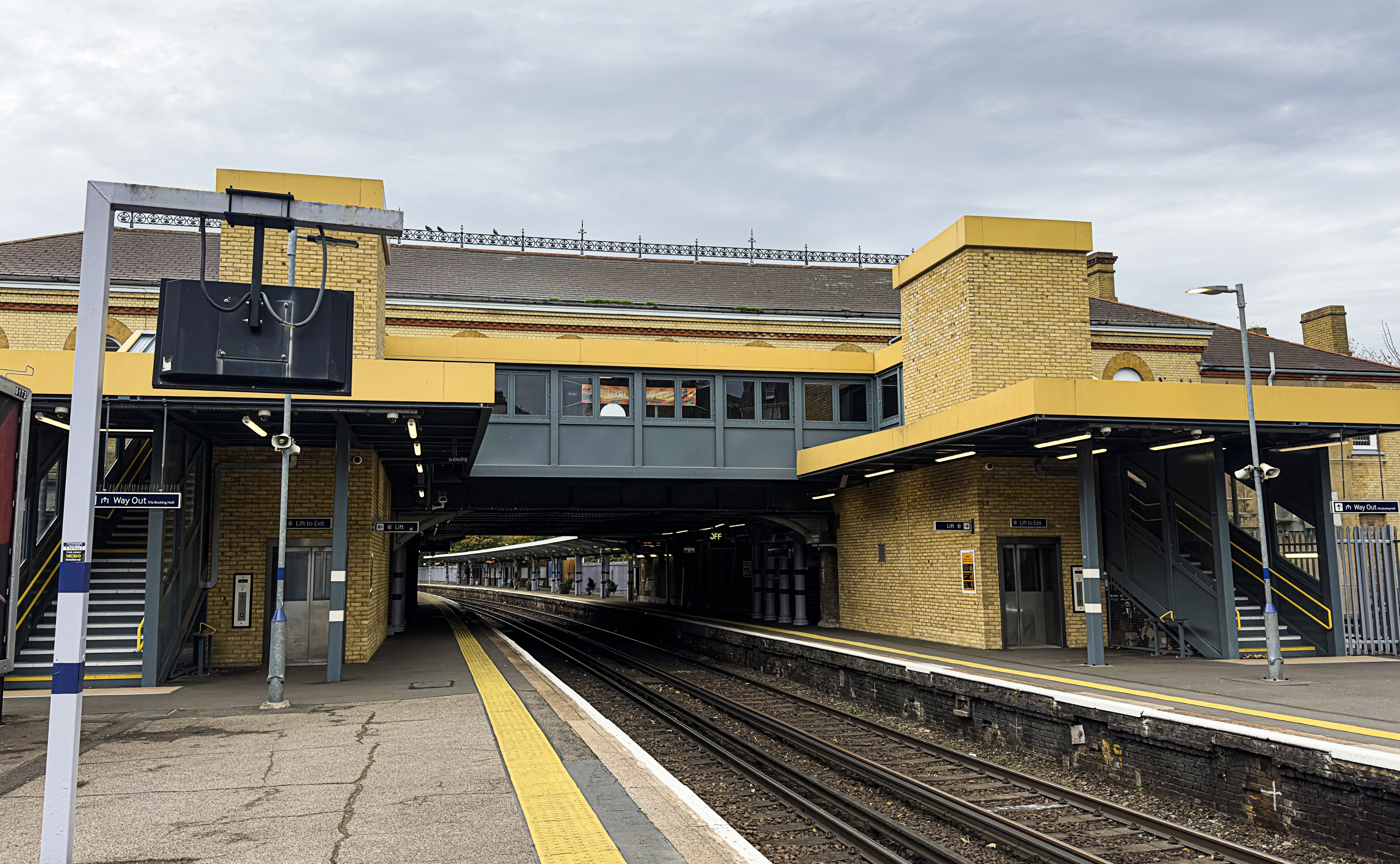
The footbridge, lift towers and platforms (2025)

The building is located at one side of the road bridge (now Railway Street) over the track, with a taxi rank located between the road and the building. Stairs lead down to the platforms. A café is located on the London-bound platform, with a coffee shop at the main entrance.

The ticket office is open during the day, seven days a week; ticket machines are also available. There is a car park with 276 spaces and bicycle storage.

The footbridge was replaced and lifts were installed, enabling step-free access to the platforms; they were opened officially by Tracey Crouch, MP for Chatham and Aylesford, in January 2023. This work was completed as part of the Access for All scheme, at a cost of £5.8 million.

== Layout ==
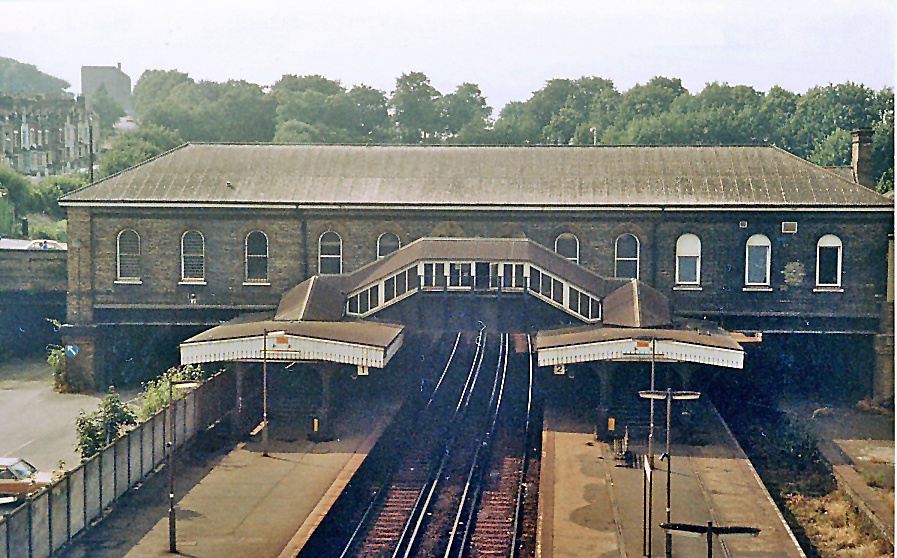
A view of the platforms (1983)

There are two platforms, both capable of accommodating 12-coach trains. There are tunnels at either end of the station: Fort Pitt Tunnel 428 yards (391 m) at the London end and Chatham Tunnel 297 yards (272 m) at the country end.

== Services ==
Services at Chatham are operated by two train operating companies; the typical off-peak service in trains per hour (tph) is:

Southeastern:

- 3 tph to London Victoria; of which:
  - 2 tph run non-stop from Bromley South
  - 1 tph runs via Denmark Hill
- 2 tph to London St Pancras International
- 1 tph to Gillingham
- 1 tph to Faversham
- 1 tph to Dover Priory, via Canterbury East
- 2 tph to Ramsgate.

Govia Thameslink Railway:

- 2 tph to Luton, via Dartford and Greenwich
- 2 tph to Rainham.

Additional services call at the station during peak hours, including trains to and from London Charing Cross via Sidcup, and fast trains to and from London Cannon Street.

Preceding station	National Rail	Following station
Rochester	Southeastern Chatham Main Line	Gillingham
Rochester	Southeastern High Speed 1	Gillingham
Rochester	Thameslink North Kent Line	Gillingham
Rochester	Southeastern North Kent Line Peak Hours Only	Gillingham

== See also ==
- Chatham Central railway station
