= Faversham railway station =

Railway station in Kent, England

Coordinates: 51°18′41″N 0°53′30″E

Faversham
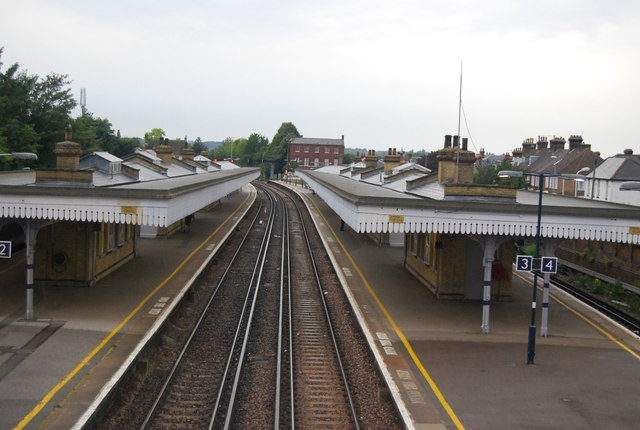

General information
- Location: Faversham, Swale; England
- Grid reference: TR016609
- Managed by: Southeastern
- Platforms: 4

Other information
- Station code: FAV
- Classification: DfT category C2

History
- Opened: 25 January 1858

Passengers
- 2020/21: ▼0.437 million
- Interchange: ▼18,717
- 2021/22: ▲1.120 million
- Interchange: ▲45,285
- 2022/23: ▲1.290 million
- Interchange: ▲185,002
- 2023/24: ▲1.328 million
- Interchange: ▲205,395
- 2024/25: ▲1.525 million
- Interchange: ▼158,923
Location
Notes
- Passenger statistics from the Office of Rail and Road

Faversham railway station is on the Chatham Main Line in England, serving the town of Faversham, Kent. It is 51 miles 77 chains (83.6 km) down the line from London Victoria. The station and all trains that call are operated by Southeastern.

== History ==
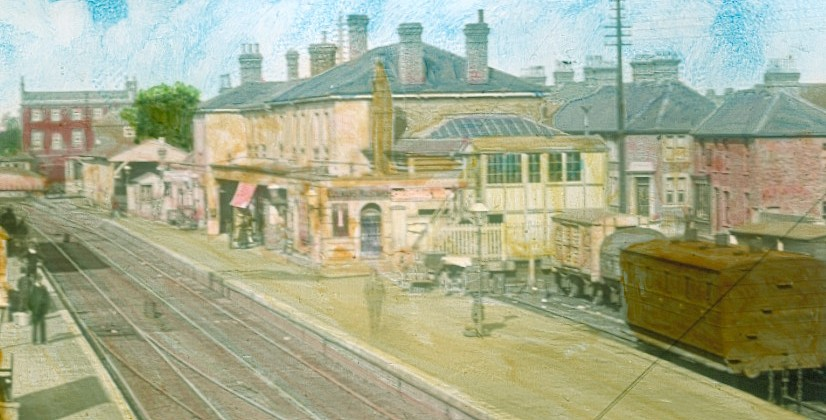
The original station in the 1880s

The original 1858 station (built for the East Kent Railway) was rebuilt in 1898 and is an example of London, Chatham & Dover Railway architecture. The buildings are Grade II listed, and have been well maintained by Network Rail in recent years. A brick engine shed (also Grade II listed) has, however, fallen into ruinous condition at the junction to the east of the station, mainly due to its inaccessibility. A further engine shed, formerly on the Faversham Creek spur has now been renovated and converted as offices. Sidings and other small buildings remain, some a legacy from pre-electrification days (1959) when Faversham Shed (73E) was of some importance. The spur line to Faversham Creek has now disappeared and incorporated into a housing development. The track ran along Standard Quay (a building beside the creek). In 1967, the track on Standard Quay was lifted, although a tiny section survives and Iron Wharf still has a few railway goods vans, now used by the boating fraternity. The brick built signal box dated from 1959 when electrification was completed. In 2009 preparatory works were completed before services to London St Pancras via Ebbsfleet International commenced on 13 December 2009. This forms part of the UK's first domestic high speed service (beyond Gravesend) with typical journey times of around 65 minutes. The Chatham Main Line was re-signalled east of Faversham during 2011, and the Faversham signal box was decommissioned in late December (still remaining in situ in July 2026). Signalling responsibilities were transferred to the power box at Gillingham.

Faversham had a barrow crossing but the section to platforms 1 and 2 was removed in 2009 to enable a platform extension as part of a multimillion-pound signalling and platform upgrade. Replacement 'platform' lifts were installed in March 2012, but they were not in use until later in the year. Replacement lifts were installed in December 2018 in a joint project between Southeastern Railway and Network Rail. They are of a better design with automatic sliding doors, one-touch operation and incorporating cctv at all levels and inside the fully enclosed lift car; they were officially opened by the Faversham MP Helen Whately on 14 December 2018.

== Accidents and incidents ==
- In May 1862, a passenger train was derailed due to defective track. Three people were killed.

== Services ==
All services at Faversham are operated by Southeastern using Class 375 and 395 EMUs.

The typical off-peak service in trains per hour is:

- 2 tph to London St Pancras International
- 2 tph to London Victoria
- 1 tph to Dover Priory via Canterbury East
- 2 tph to Ramsgate

Additional services, including trains to and from London Bridge and London Cannon Street call at the station in the peak hours.

Preceding station	National Rail	Following station
Teynham or Sittingbourne	Southeastern Chatham Main Line - Ramsgate Branch	Whitstable
Teynham or Sittingbourne	Southeastern Chatham Main Line - Dover Branch	Selling
Sittingbourne	Southeastern High Speed 1	Whitstable
