= British Rail Class 375 =

British electric multiple unit train

British Rail Class 375 Electrostar
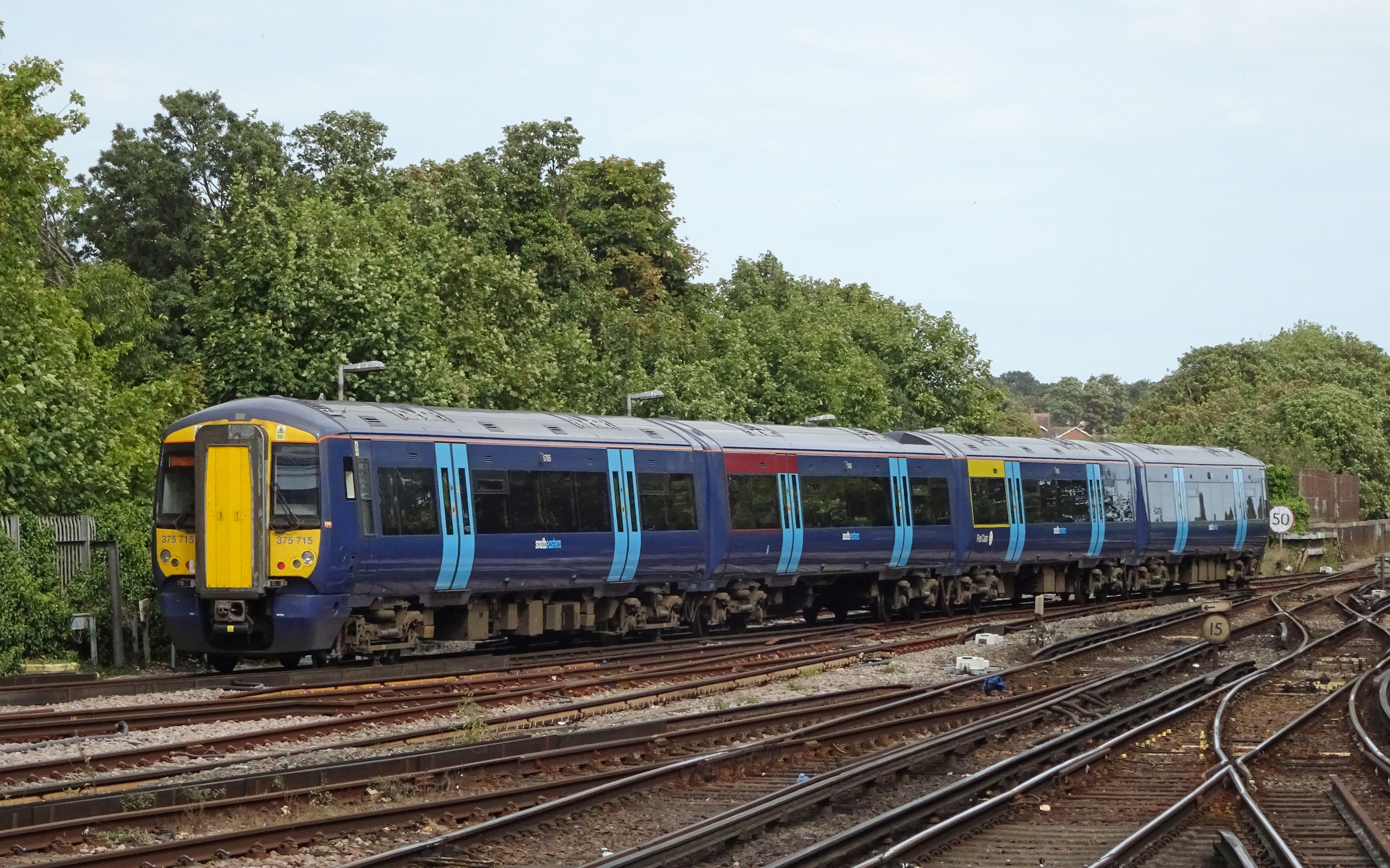
- London & South Eastern Railway Class 375 leaving Ramsgate EMU Depot

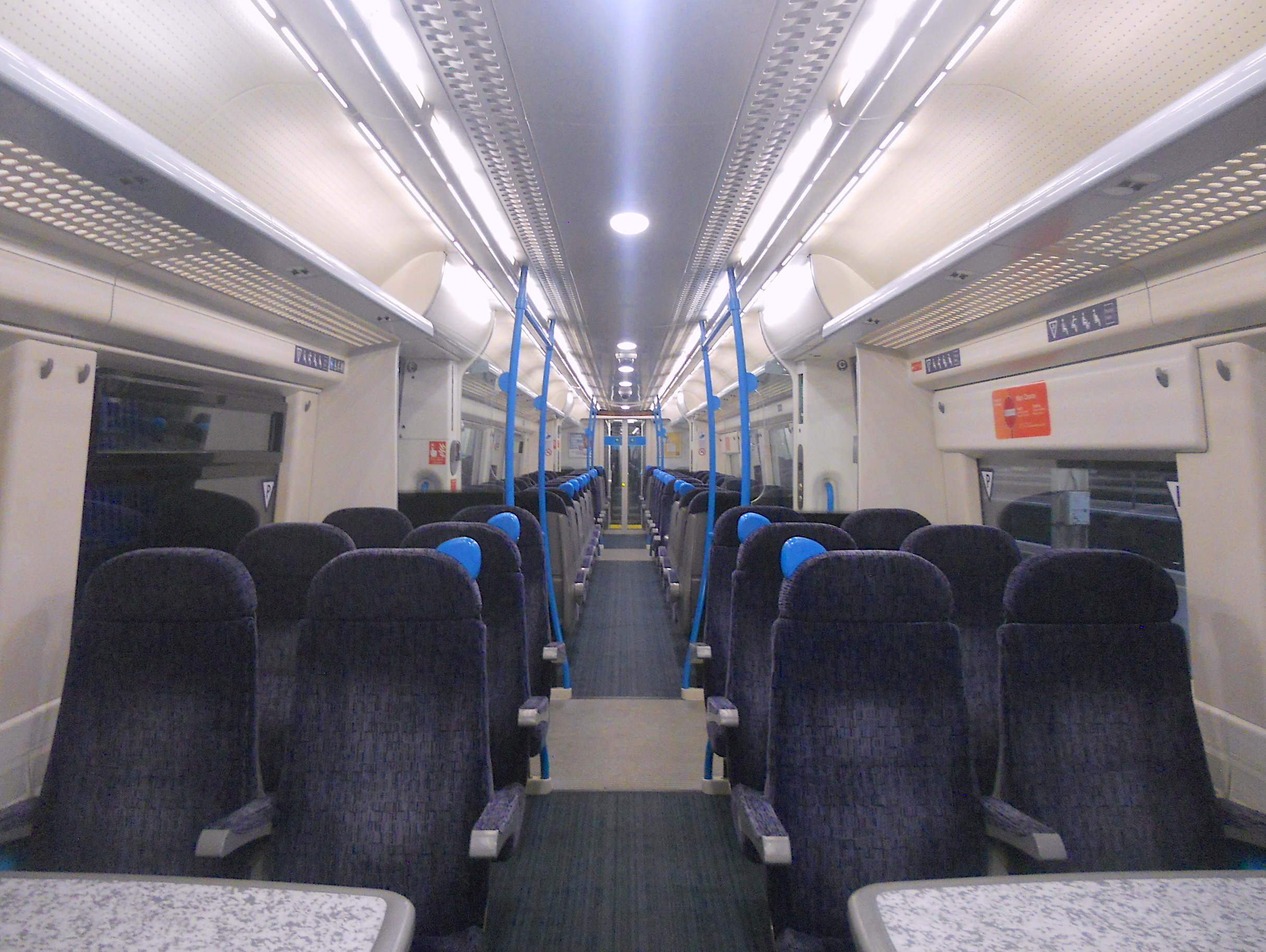
- The interior of a refurbished Class 375
- In service: 2000–present
- Manufacturers: Adtranz; Bombardier Transportation
- Built at: Derby Litchurch Lane Works
- Family name: Electrostar
- Replaced: Class 365; Class 411; Class 421; Class 423; Class 466; Class 508
- Constructed: 1999–2005
- Refurbished: 2015–2018
- Number built: 140
- Number in service: 112; (28 converted to Class 377/3)
- Formation: 375/3: 3 cars per unit; Others: 4 cars per unit
- Capacity: 375/3: 176 seats; 375/9: 273 seats; Others: 236 seats
- Owner: Eversholt Rail Group
- Operator: Southeastern

Specifications
- Car length: 20.39 m (66 ft 11 in) (end cars); 19.98 m (65 ft 7 in) (middle cars)
- Width: 2.80 m (9 ft 2 in)
- Height: 3.78 m (12 ft 5 in)
- Maximum speed: 100 mph (161 km/h)
- Weight: 133.1 t (131.0 long tons; 146.7 short tons) (375/3); 173.6 t (170.9 long tons; 191.4 short tons) (Others)
- Traction motors: 6–8 × 250 kW (340 hp)
- Power output: 375/3: 1,000 kW (1,300 hp); Others: 1,500 kW (2,000 hp)
- Acceleration: 0.62 m/s^{2} (1.4 mph/s)
- Electric systems: 750 V DC third rail; 25 kV 50 Hz AC overhead (375/6 only)
- Current collection: Contact shoe (DC); Pantograph (AC) (375/6 only)
- Coupling system: Dellner 12; (Subclasses /3, /6, and /7 converted from Tightlock)
- Track gauge: 1,435 mm (4 ft 8 1/2 in) standard gauge

Notes/references
- Sourced from unless otherwise noted.

The British Rail Class 375 Electrostar is an electric multiple unit train that was built at Derby Litchurch Lane Works, thirty units by Adtranz from 1999 to 2001, and 110 units by Bombardier Transportation (successors to Adtranz) from 2001 to 2004. The class form part of the Electrostar family of units, which also includes classes 357, 376, 377, 378, 379 and 387, the most numerous type of EMU introduced since the privatisation of British Rail.

These units form the basis of Southeastern's mainline fleet.

== Description ==
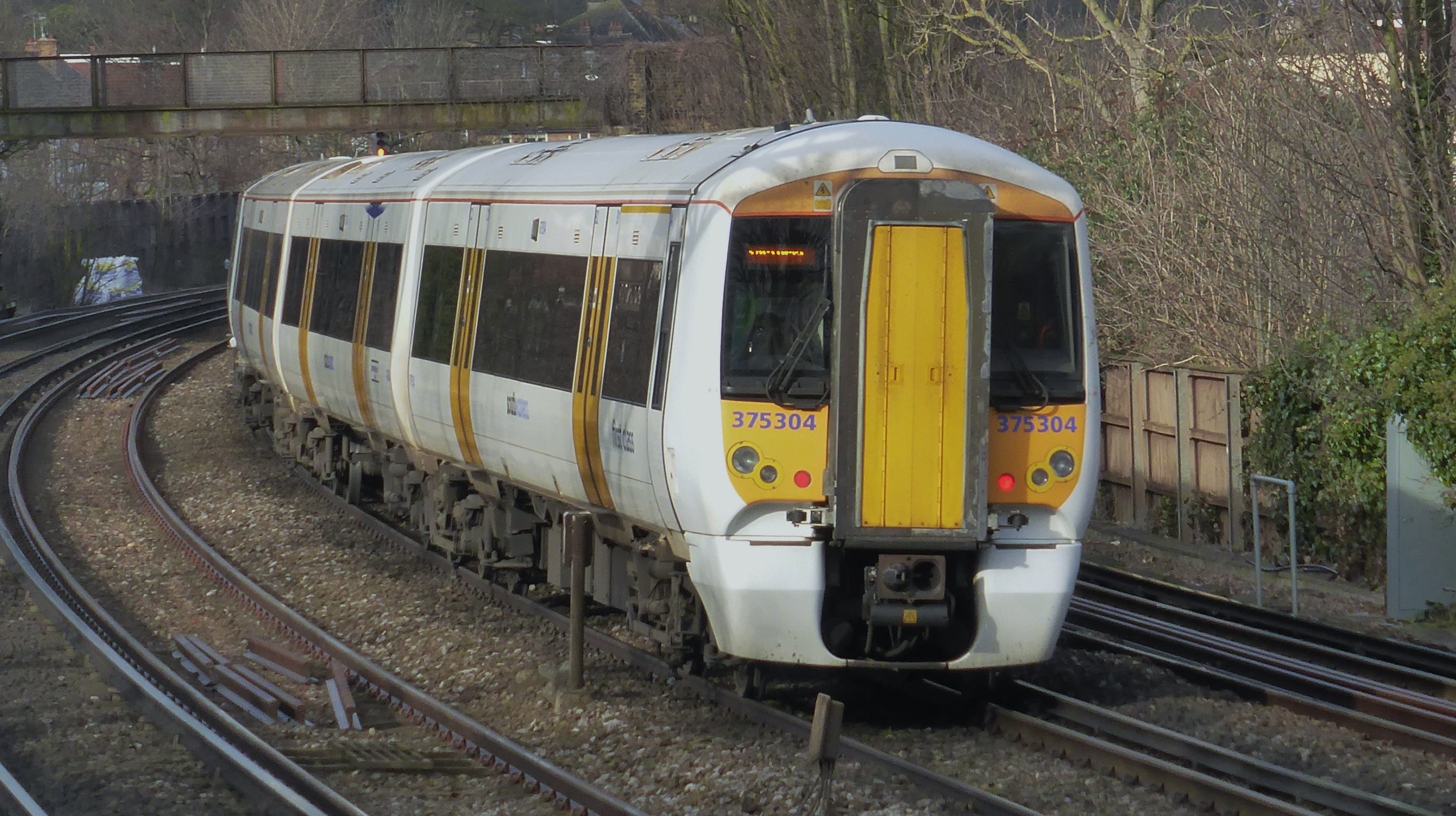
Class 375 prior to refurbishment

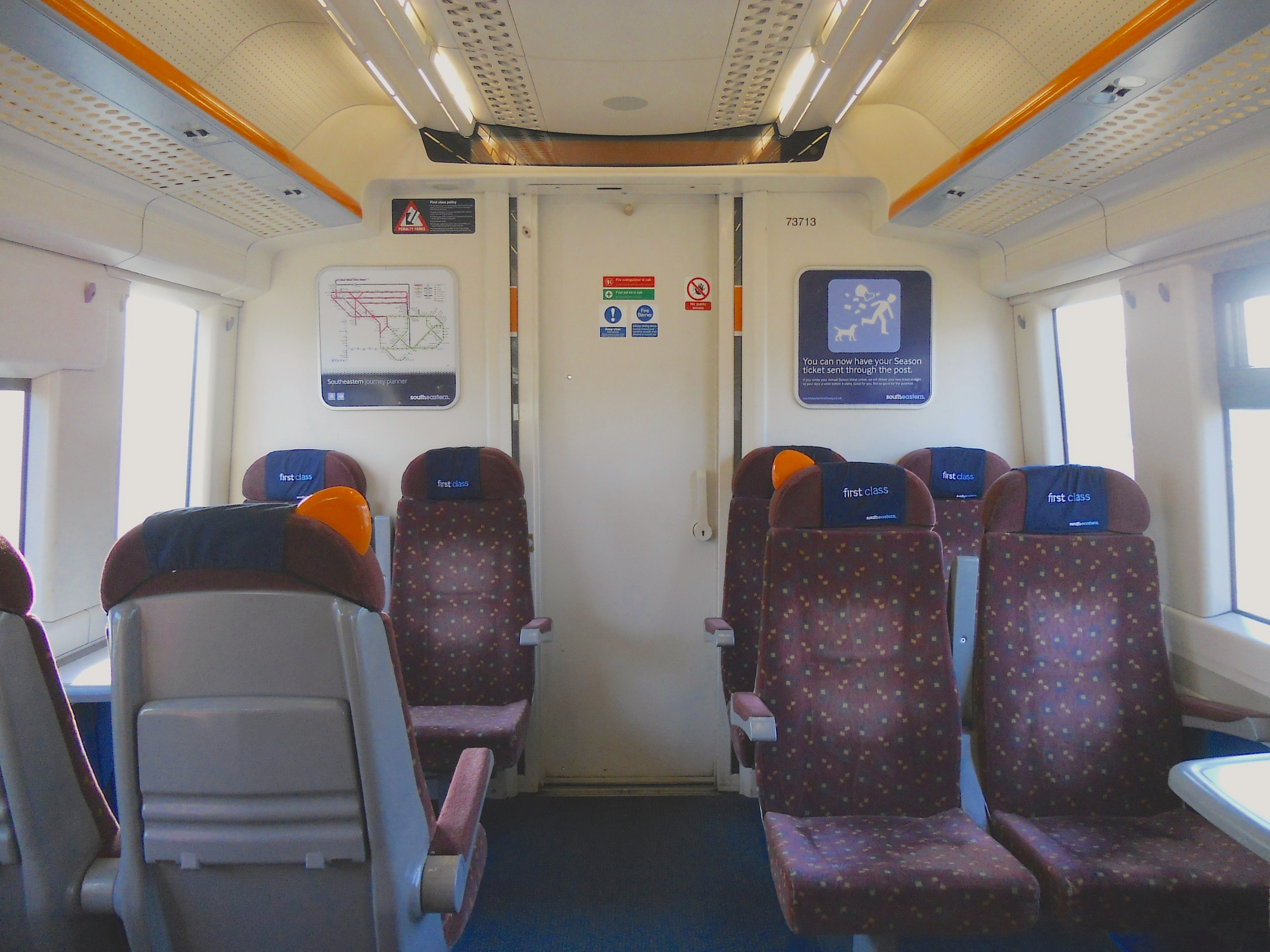
The interior of First Class prior to refurbishment

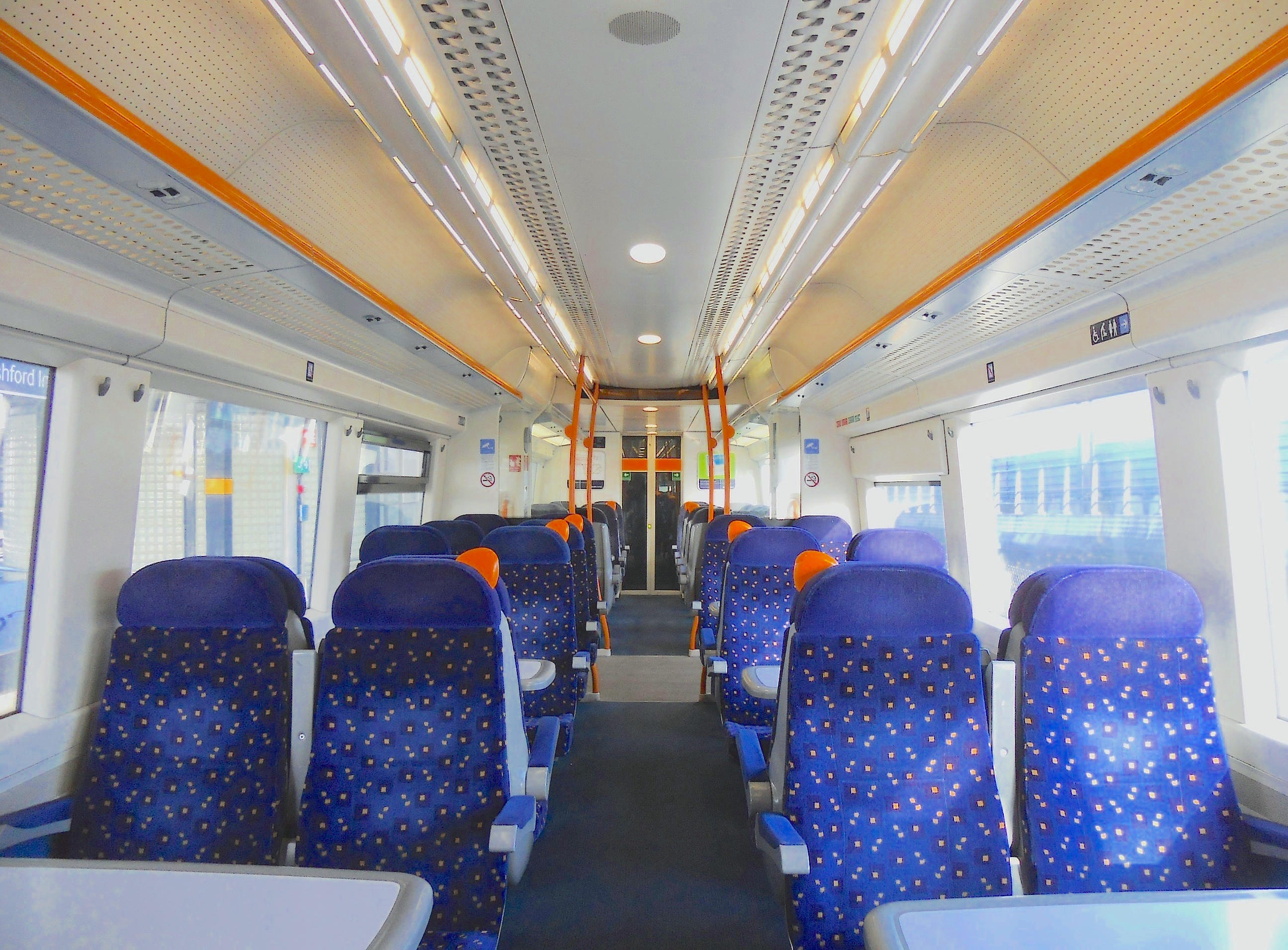
The interior of Standard Class prior to refurbishment

Introduced into service in 2000, these trains are owned by Eversholt Rail Group (formerly HSBC Rail) and leased to Southeastern for operation from London to Kent and parts of East Sussex.

The Class 375 is the principal train used by Southeastern, and replaced the slam-door Mark 1 derived stock, which were more than 40 years old and did not meet modern health and safety requirements and replaced the 16 Class 365s which were transferred to WAGN in 2004. All units have been converted from Tightlock to Dellner couplers.

== Refurbishment ==
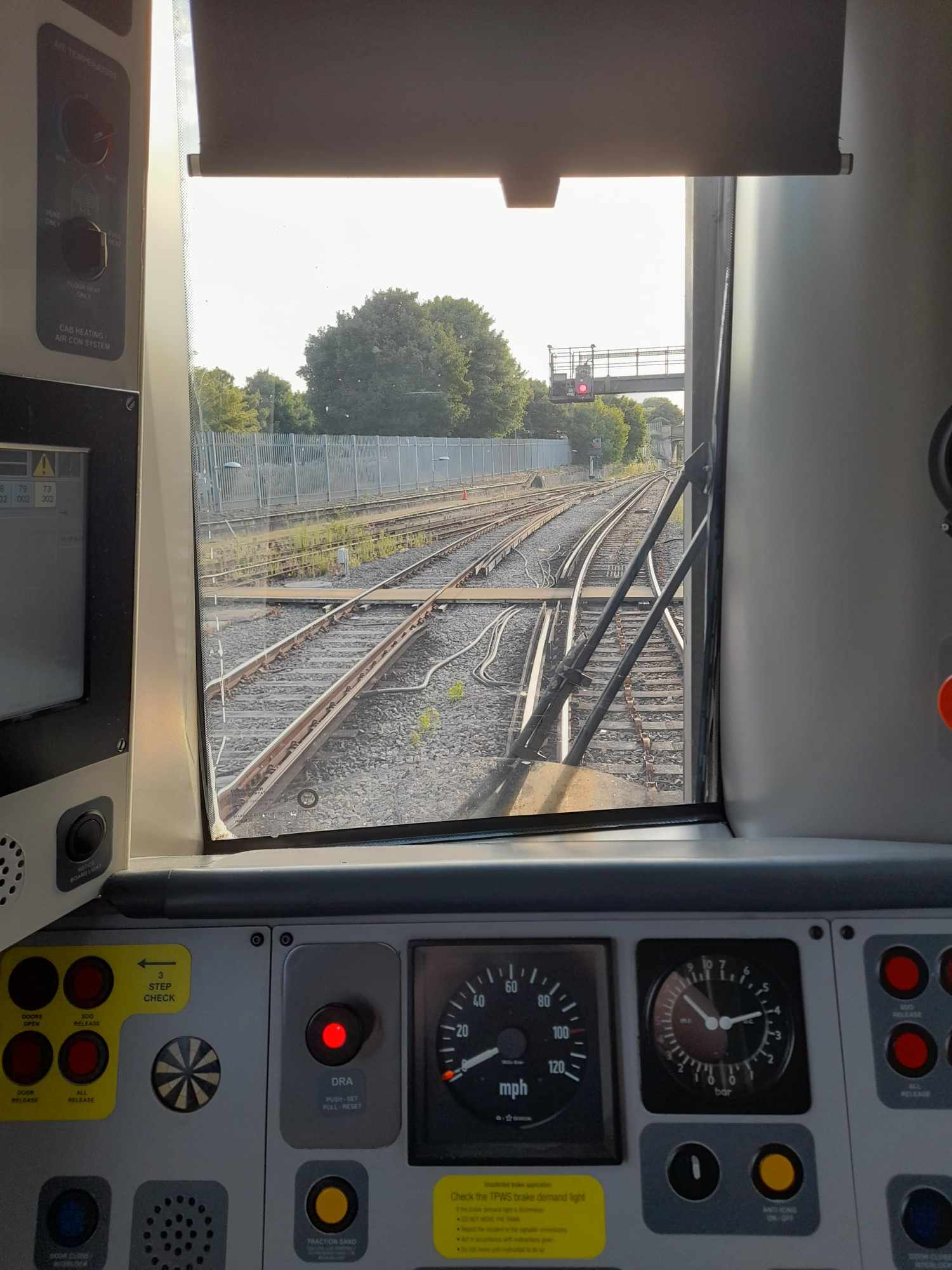
The cab view of a Class 375

In 2015, 112 units, around one third of the now 15-year old fleet of 367, were refurbished at Bombardier's Derby Litchurch Lane Works. The work included an exterior repaint, new carpets and lino flooring, as well as removing and re-covering every seat.

== Accidents and incidents ==
- On 8 November 2010, a passenger train operated by unit 375 711 overran Stonegate station, on the Hastings Line in East Sussex, due to low railhead adhesion in the leaf fall season and maintenance errors in respect of the train's sanding apparatus. The train continued to slide beyond the station for 2 miles 36 chains (3.94 km). Following the incident, Southeastern reduced the interval that the sand hoppers were to be refilled from seven days to five days.
- On 24 November 2014, the front carriage of unit 375 611 caught fire from faulty electrical insulation pots at Charing Cross Platform 6. There were no injuries, though both the track and leading carriage required repairs, part of the rail being melted.
- On 26 July 2015, units 375 703 and 375 612 formed a train that collided with a herd of cattle on the line at Godmersham, between Wye and Chilham, Kent. The leading carriage of 375 703 was derailed. There were no injuries amongst the 70 passengers and crew on board.
- On 5 January 2018, unit 375 815 hit a fallen tree near Herne Bay. Though damage was sustained to the leading carriage, there were no injuries.
- On 24 October 2018, shortly before midnight unit 375 301 leading 375 906 hit a car abandoned on a level crossing between Teynham and Faversham. The car caught fire and the leading carriage of 375 301 sustained damage to its corridor, bogie and coupling.
- On 13 July 2025, units 375 905 and 375 608 formed a train that collided with a van on a level crossing between Teynham and Sittingbourne.

== Operations ==
=== Main lines ===
Class 375s work the following main line routes:

- Charing Cross – Tunbridge Wells and Hastings fast and local services
- Charing Cross – Dover Priory and Ramsgate via Ashford International.
- Victoria – Ramsgate and Dover Priory via Chatham
- Cannon Street - Ramsgate/Broadstairs via Chatham (peak hours only)

=== Outer suburban ===
Class 375s also work the following outer suburban Southeastern routes interchangeably with Class 377/5 and Class 465/9 units:

- Charing Cross – Tunbridge Wells
- Victoria/ Charing Cross – Ashford International and Maidstone East,
- Victoria - Dover Priory via Denmark Hill and Gillingham (Kent)
- Victoria - Canterbury East/ Faversham (Sundays only)

=== Medway Valley Line ===
Class 375/3 Electrostar units started operating services on the Medway Valley Line from May 2012 to January 2016, and then from September 2016 to the present day. Previously Class 466 Networkers were the regular units on this line with the occasional Class 465 Networker or 4-car 375 Electrostar being used as a substitute. The Networkers are no longer used on this route as the Class 466s are now non-compliant with the new PRM-TSI law and the volume of traffic cannot support Class 465s or 4-car Class 375s/377s Electrostars.

- Strood – Maidstone West/Paddock Wood/Tonbridge

=== Sheerness line ===
From December 2019, Class 375/3 units replaced Class 466 units on the Sheerness line due to the latter being non-compliant with the new PRM-TSI law.

== Fleet details ==
Class	Type	Operator	No. in traffic	Year built	Cars per unit	Unit nos.	Notes
375/3	Express & outer suburban	Southeastern	10	2001–2002	3	375301–375310	Formed DMOC-TOSL-DMOS. Units 375311–375338 were transferred to Southern, converted from Tightlock to Dellner couplers, and renumbered 377301–377328.
375/6	Express & outer suburban	Southeastern	30	1999–2001	4	375601–375630	Dual-voltage units. Originally formed DMOC-PTOSL-MOSL-DMOC. Refurbished to DMOS-PTOSL-MOCL-DMOS.
375/7	Express & outer suburban	Southeastern	15	2001–2002	4	375701–375715	Originally formed DMOC-TOSL-MOSL-DMOC. Refurbished to DMOS-TOSL-MOCL-DMOS.
375/8	Express & outer suburban	Southeastern	30	2004–2005	4	375801–375830	Originally formed DMOC-TOSL-MOSL-DMOC. Refurbished to DMOS-TOSL-MOCL-DMOS.
375/9	Express & outer suburban	Southeastern	27	2003–2004	4	375901–375927	Refurbished to DMOC-TOSL-MOSL-DMOC with 3+2 seating in Standard class. First class was at both ends of the train prior to its removal.

=== Illustrations ===
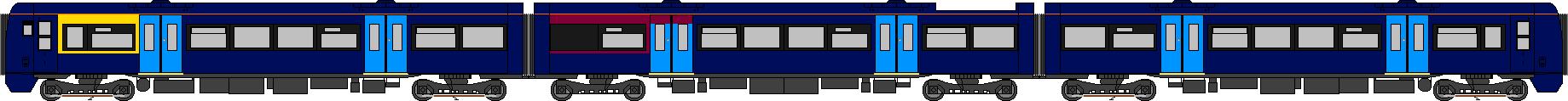
Illustration of a Southeastern Class 375/3 unit
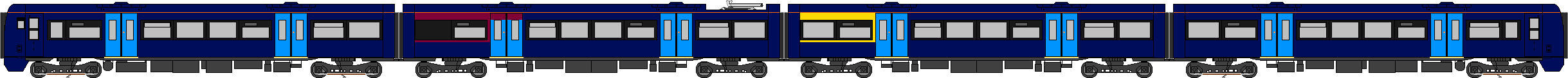
Illustration of a Southeastern Class 375/6 unit
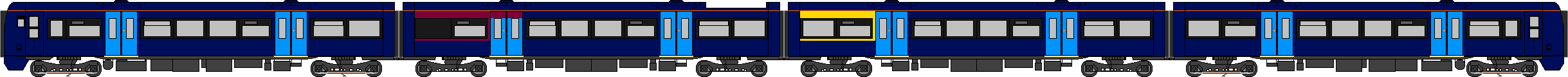
Illustration of a Southeastern Class 375/7/8 unit
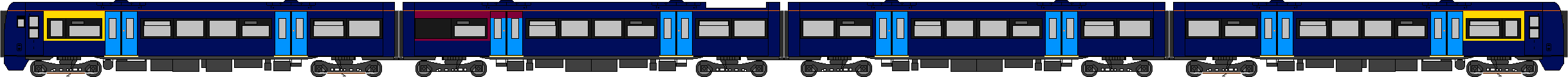
Illustration of a Southeastern Class 375/9 unit

== Named Units ==
Some units have received names:

- 375304 Medway Valley Line 1856-2006
- 375608 Bromley Travelwise
- 375610 Royal Tunbridge Wells
- 375611 Dr William Harvey
- 375619 Driver John Neve
- 375623 Hospice in the Weald
- 375624 White Cliffs Country
- 375701 Kent Air Ambulance Explorer
- 375703 Dickens Traveller
- 375710 Rochester Castle
- 375714 Rochester Cathedral
- 375810 Celebrating 40 years of the Tonbridge to Hastings Line electrification
- 375822 King Harold II – Proudly connecting our communities to the Bayeux Tapestry at the British Museum
- 375823 Ashford Proudly served by rail for 175 years
- 375829 Verena Holmes (1889–1964) Woman in Engineering
- 375830 City of London
