= East Farleigh =

Village in Kent, England

Coordinates: 51.233333°N 0.483333°E

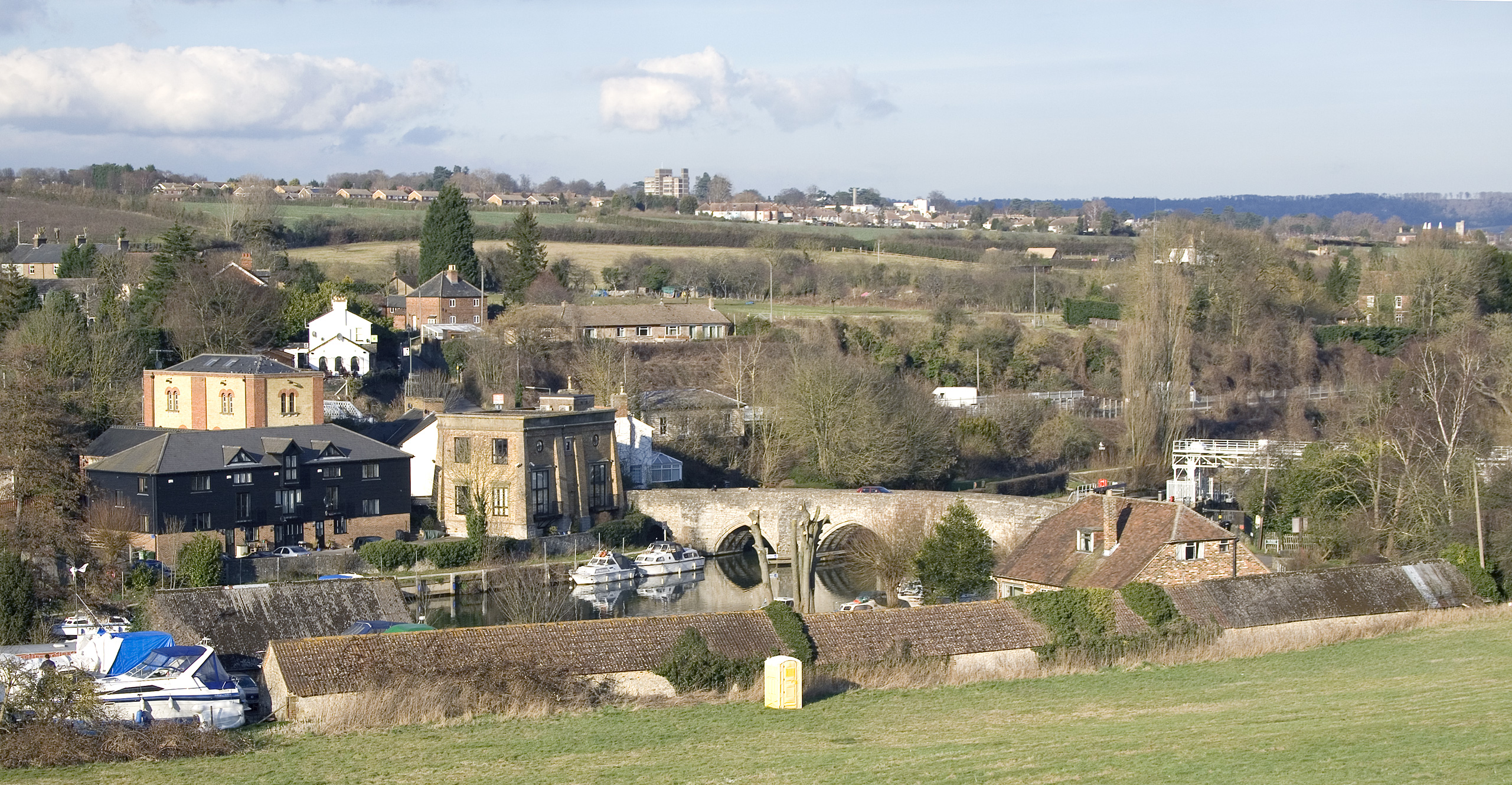

- Location within Kent
- Population: 1,500 (2011 Census)
- OS grid reference: TQ7335051225
  - London: 32 miles (51 km)
- District: Maidstone
- Shire county: Kent
- Region: South East
- Country: England
- Sovereign state: United Kingdom
- Post town: Maidstone
- Postcode district: ME15
- Dialling code: 01622
- Police: Kent
- Fire: Kent
- Ambulance: South East Coast
- UK Parliament: Weald of Kent
- Website: East Farleigh Parish Council

East Farleigh (Great Farleigh in some older reference works) is a village and civil parish in the local government district of Maidstone, Kent, England. The village is located on the south side of the River Medway about two miles (3.2 km) upstream from the town of Maidstone.

== Heritage ==
The Grade I listed East Farleigh Bridge crossing the river here was built in the 14th century and is considered one of the oldest in Kent. It is too narrow to suit modern traffic conditions. It provided the crossing point for the Parliamentary forces in the Battle of Maidstone during the Civil War.

The population of the village expanded from 642 people in 1801 to 1,668 in 1881. The population growth occurred in parallel with an increase in hop production, which the tithe map of 1841 show covering a quarter of all land in the parish, 40 years before peak production was reached. In September 1849, an outbreak of cholera at East Farleigh killed 43 hop-pickers. During the 1860s, the Rev. John Young Stratton, rector of nearby Ditton, was among those who campaigned to improve the conditions of hop-pickers; the Society for Employment and Improved Lodgings for Hop Pickers was formed in 1866. Hops are no longer grown in the parish. The last oast house in the village ceased working in 1977.

East Farleigh appears in the Domesday Book as Ferlaga from the Saxon words referring to a passage (over the river in this case). The nearby village of West Farleigh has the same roots. The 12th-century church is dedicated to St Mary and is a listed building. East Farleigh House was the home of the noted artist Donald Maxwell from 1930 to 1936, and he is buried in the churchyard.

== Amenities ==
There are three public houses in the parish: The Bull Inn in the centre of the village, as well as The Horseshoes on Dean Street and the Walnut Tree on Forge Lane. The East Farleigh Social Club is also near the centre of the village.

East Farleigh railway station (across the River Medway and so technically in the parish of Barming) is on the Medway Valley Line. Trains run north to Maidstone Barracks and Maidstone West, and then on to Strood (with a connection to High Speed 1); and south to Paddock Wood and Tonbridge (with a connection to the South Eastern Main Line).

== Notable residents ==
- Reynold Pympe, 15th century MP
- Robert and Henry Wilberforce, two of the sons of William Wilberforce, both of whom were vicars of East Farleigh (1832-1840 and 1843-1850 respectively), are buried in St Mary's churchyard. The latter converted to Catholicism and addressed his 1851 publication Reasons for Submitting to the Catholic Church: a Farewell Letter to his Parishioners to the people of East Farleigh. William Wilberforce himself stayed at The Old Rectory shortly before he died.
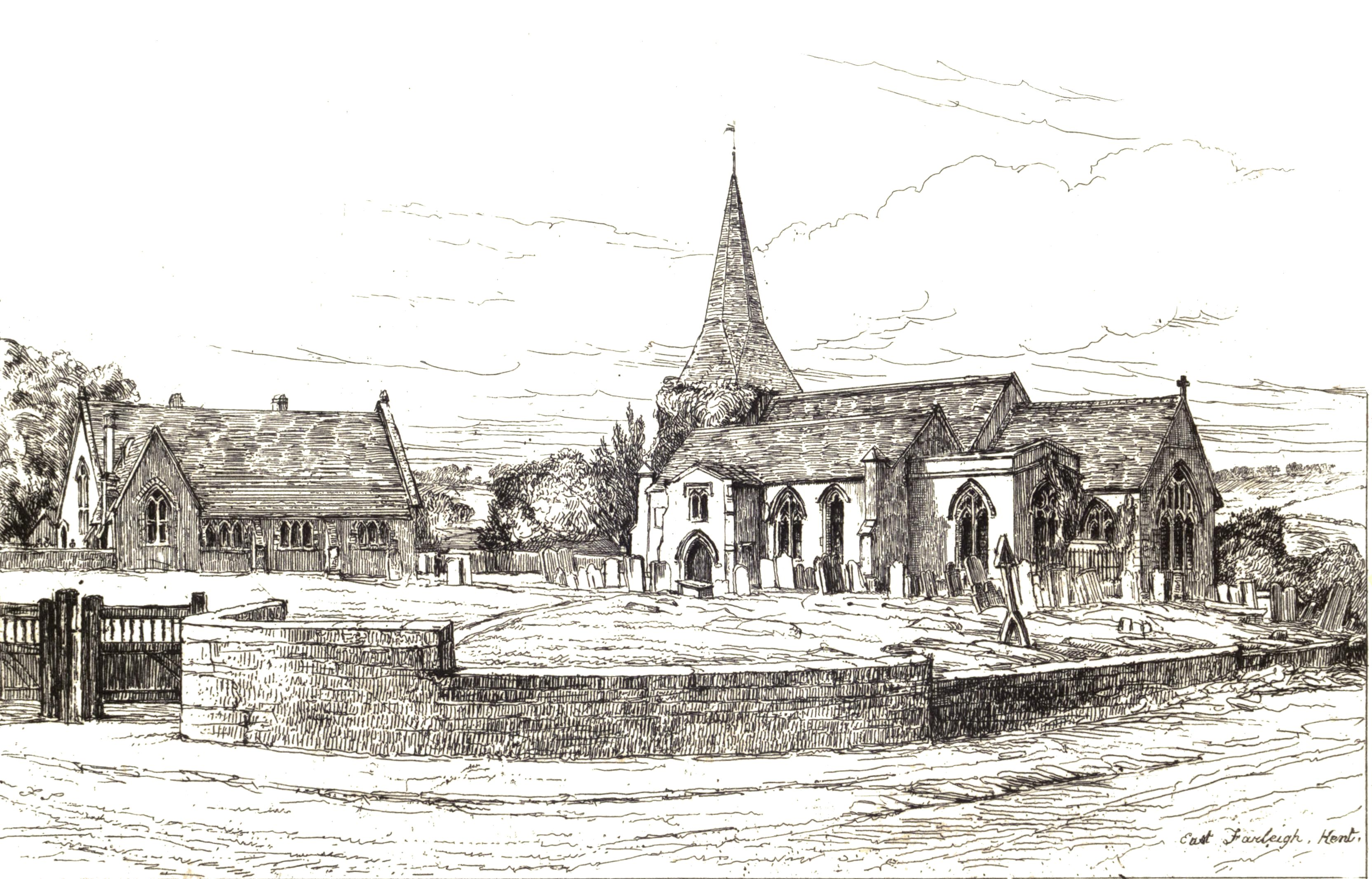
East Farleigh Church

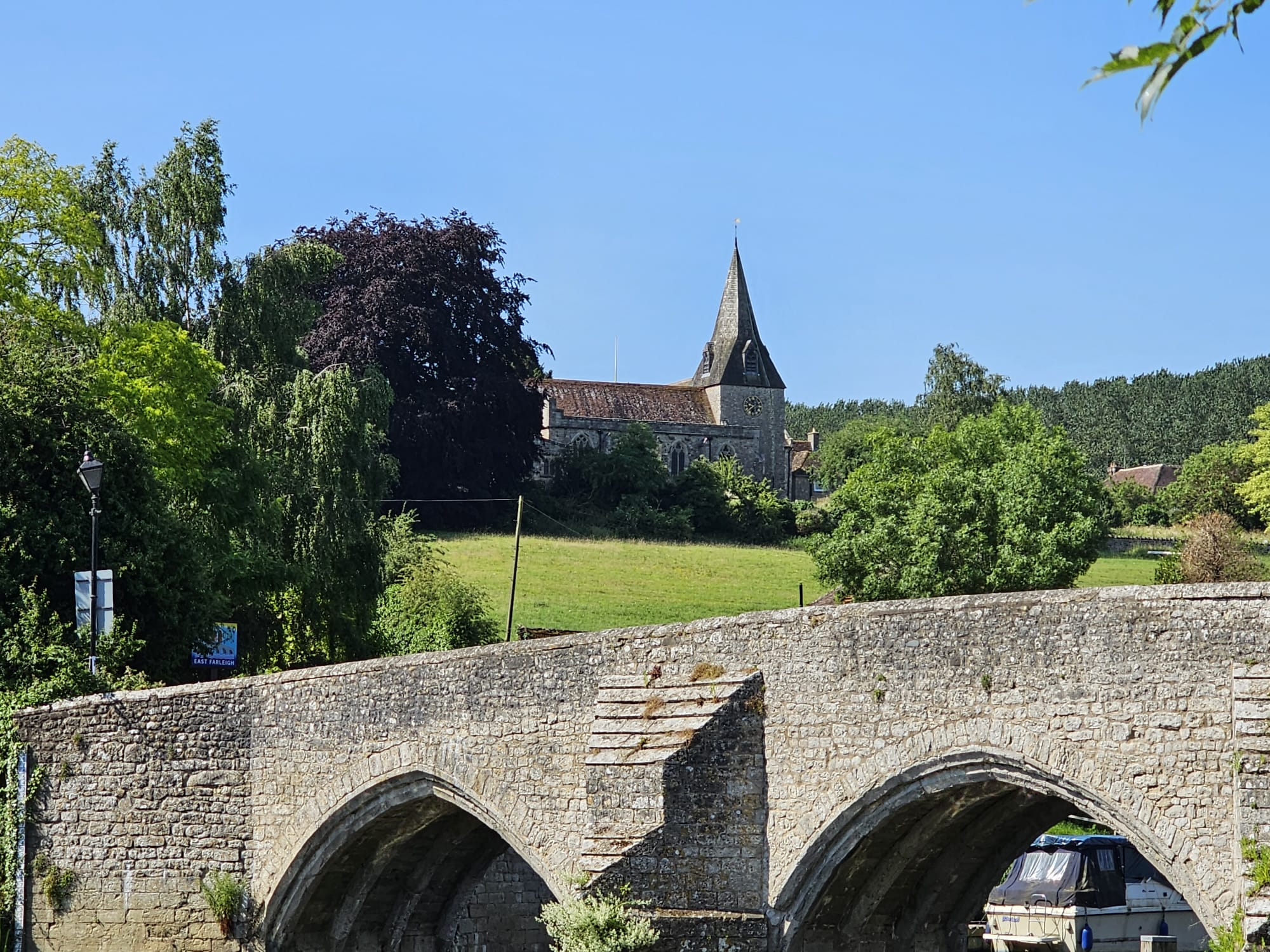
East Farleigh Church and Bridge

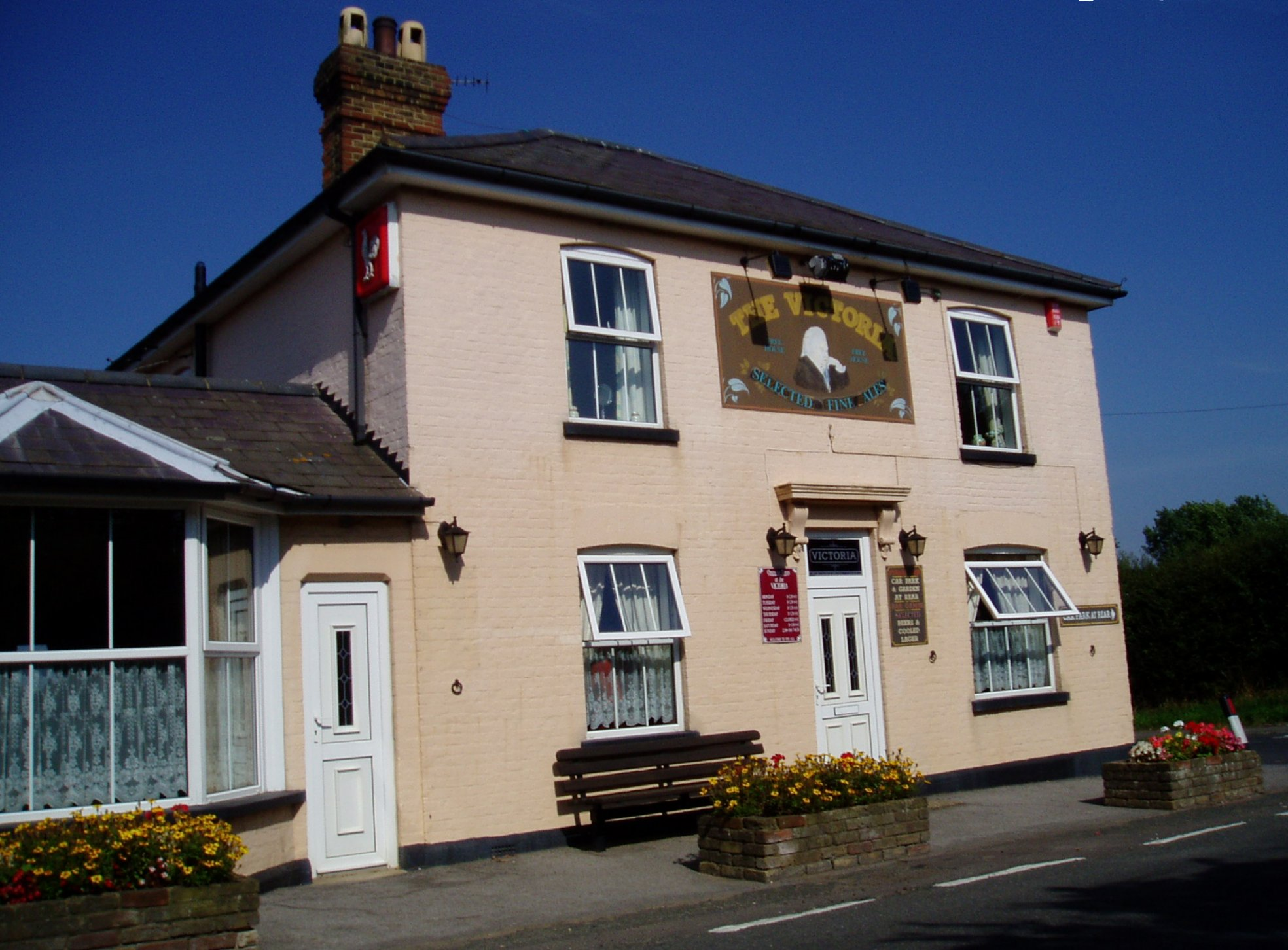
The Victoria

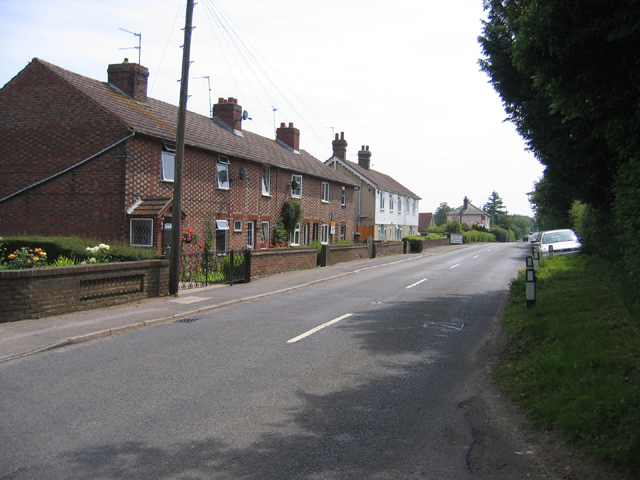
Heath Road

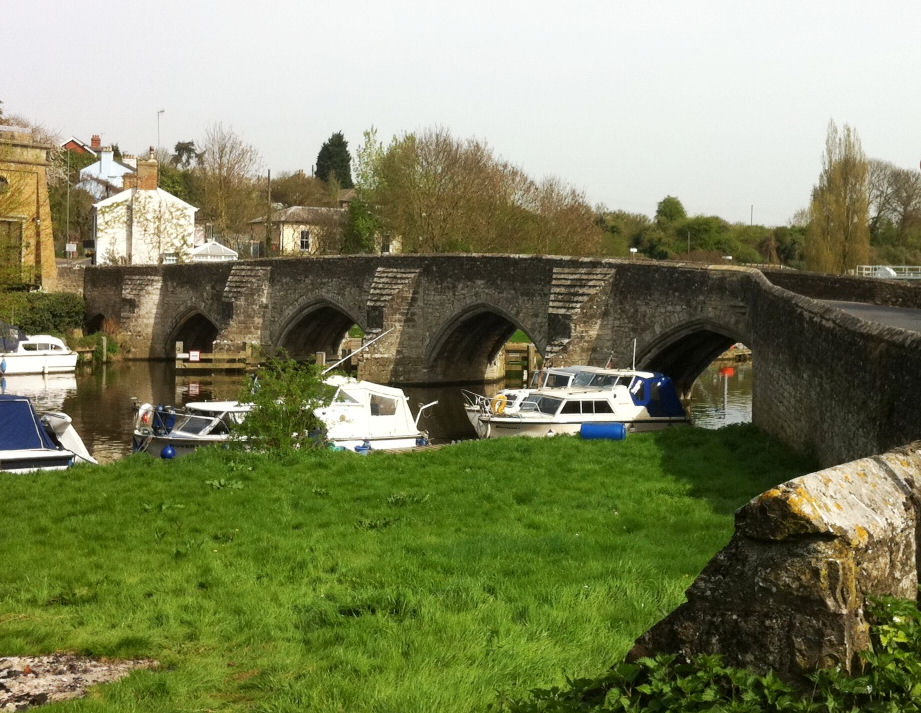
The medieval bridge
