= Maidstone railway station =

Maidstone railway station could refer to:

- Maidstone Barracks railway station, on the Medway Valley Line
- Maidstone East railway station, on the Maidstone East Line
- Maidstone West railway station, on the Medway Valley Line
- Paddock Wood railway station, originally named Maidstone Road
