= Larkfield, Kent =

Village in Kent, England

Coordinates: 51.299497°N 0.44292510°E

Larkfield
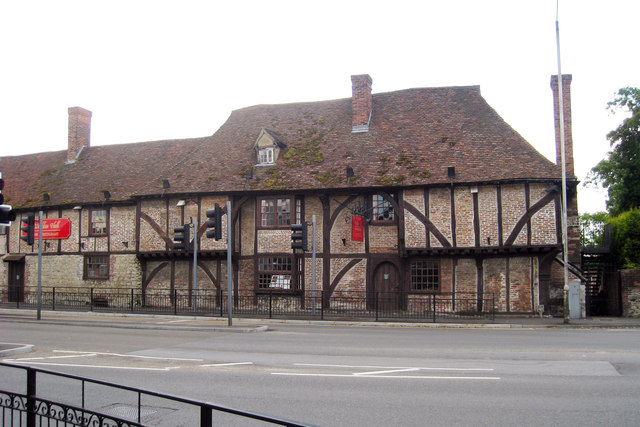
- The Wealden Hall pub in Larkfield

- Location within Kent
- Civil parish: East Malling and Larkfield
- District: Tonbridge and Malling
- Shire county: Kent
- Region: South East
- Country: England
- Sovereign state: United Kingdom
- Post town: AYLESFORD
- Postcode district: ME20
- Dialling code: 01732

Larkfield is a village in Kent, part of the civil parish of East Malling and Larkfield in the borough of Tonbridge and Malling. Of the two parts of the parish, Larkfield is much more built-up, lying on and north of the main A20 road. The M20 motorway also passes through, with junction 4 residing at the centre of Leybourne on the A228.

The name of Larkfield is literal and descriptive – it refers to the large numbers of skylarks found in the fields; its first recorded instance is in Domesday Book as Lavrochesfel.

== History ==
Larkfield was once a hundred in Kent.

Larkfield has expanded rapidly since the M20 motorway was constructed in the 1970s and it continues to grow, with new housing developments being built. These are The Lakes in Leybourne, on disused gravel pits that were turned into man-made lakes. The decision to build on this area was unpopular with some residents, but the remaining lakes were turned into Leybourne Lakes Country Park to offset the impact of the new housing. The village of New Hythe is largely industrial and adjoins Larkfield.

In 1961 Malling Rural District Council developed the "Tree"(shared with the Parish of Ditton) and "Bird" estates, where the majority of the roads are named after species of trees and birds respectively. Similarly in Lunsford Park just north of the M20, the roads are named after famous poets.

Larkfield has been of some historical interest throughout recent times, with a number of archaeological discoveries in the area.

Close to the main crossroads on the A20, Larkfield Priory Hotel, built in 1890, is allegedly haunted.

== Amenities ==
The parish church at Larkfield is Trinity and there is also a Methodist church in Larkfield.

A large Tesco supermarket sits to the North end of the parish, near the country park. There is also another supermarket, built originally as part of the Safeway chain, which stands on the corner of New Hythe Lane and the London road. Following the demise of Safeway in 2004, it changed several times in quick succession, becoming first a Morrisons for a short time, as part of that company's purchase of the bulk of the Safeway estate, before being sold to Somerfield, and in 2009, re-opening, fully refurbished, once again as a Morrison's.

KM Group head office based in Larkfield has now moved to Rochester.

Larkfield has three schools on a campus site: Brookfield Infants, Brookfield Juniors, and Lunsford Primary. There is a small local shopping area at Martin Square, which also provides a library, a retirement home and a modern Health Centre, Thornhills Medical Practice. The main secondary school for the area is The Malling School in East Malling. Larkfield Leisure Centre was built in the 1980s on New Hythe Lane.

== Transport ==
Larkfield is served by New Hythe and Aylesford stations, with services to Maidstone, Paddock Wood and the Medway towns.
