= Wateringbury railway station =

Railway station in Kent, England

Wateringbury
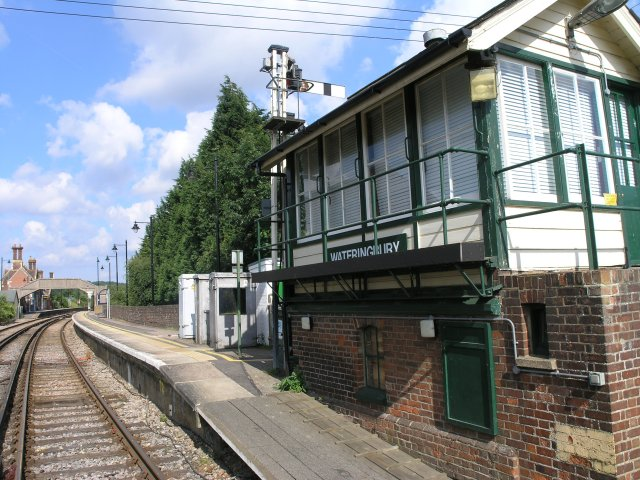

General information
- Location: Wateringbury, Tonbridge and Malling; England
- Coordinates: 51.2493°N 0.4225°E
- Grid reference: TQ691528
- Manager: Southeastern
- Platforms: 2

Other information
- Station code: WTR
- Classification: DfT category F2

History
- Opened: 25 September 1844

Passengers
- 2020/21: ▼15,844
- 2021/22: ▲50,202
- 2022/23: ▲57,508
- 2023/24: ▲66,612
- 2024/25: ▲71,746
Location
Notes
- Passenger statistics from the Office of Rail and Road

Wateringbury railway station is on the Medway Valley Line in Kent, England, serving the villages of Wateringbury and Nettlestead. It is 39 miles 77 chains (64.3 km) down the line from London Charing Cross via Paddock Wood and is situated between Yalding and East Farleigh. The station and all trains that call are operated by Southeastern.

The station building, regarded as one of the finest Tudor-style stations in the country, was listed at Grade II in 1985.

The APTIS-equipped ticket office in this building (on the northbound platform) closed in 1989; the building has remained disused for many years, though is in reasonable condition. In 2007, a PERTIS permit to travel ticket machine was installed at the entrance to the northbound platform.

The signal box, which was Grade II listed in 2013 remains to control the level crossing.

== Services ==
All services at Wateringbury are operated by Southeastern using Class 375 EMUs.

The typical off-peak service in trains per hour is:

- 2 tph to Strood via Maidstone West
- 2 tph to Paddock Wood

A small number of morning, mid afternoon and late evening trains continue beyond Paddock Wood to Tonbridge.

On Sundays, the service is reduced to hourly in each direction.

Preceding station	National Rail	Following station
East Farleigh	Southeastern Medway Valley Line	Yalding
	Disused railways	
Teston Halt	British Rail Southern Region Medway Valley Line	Yalding
