= Yalding railway station =

Railway station in Kent, England

Yalding
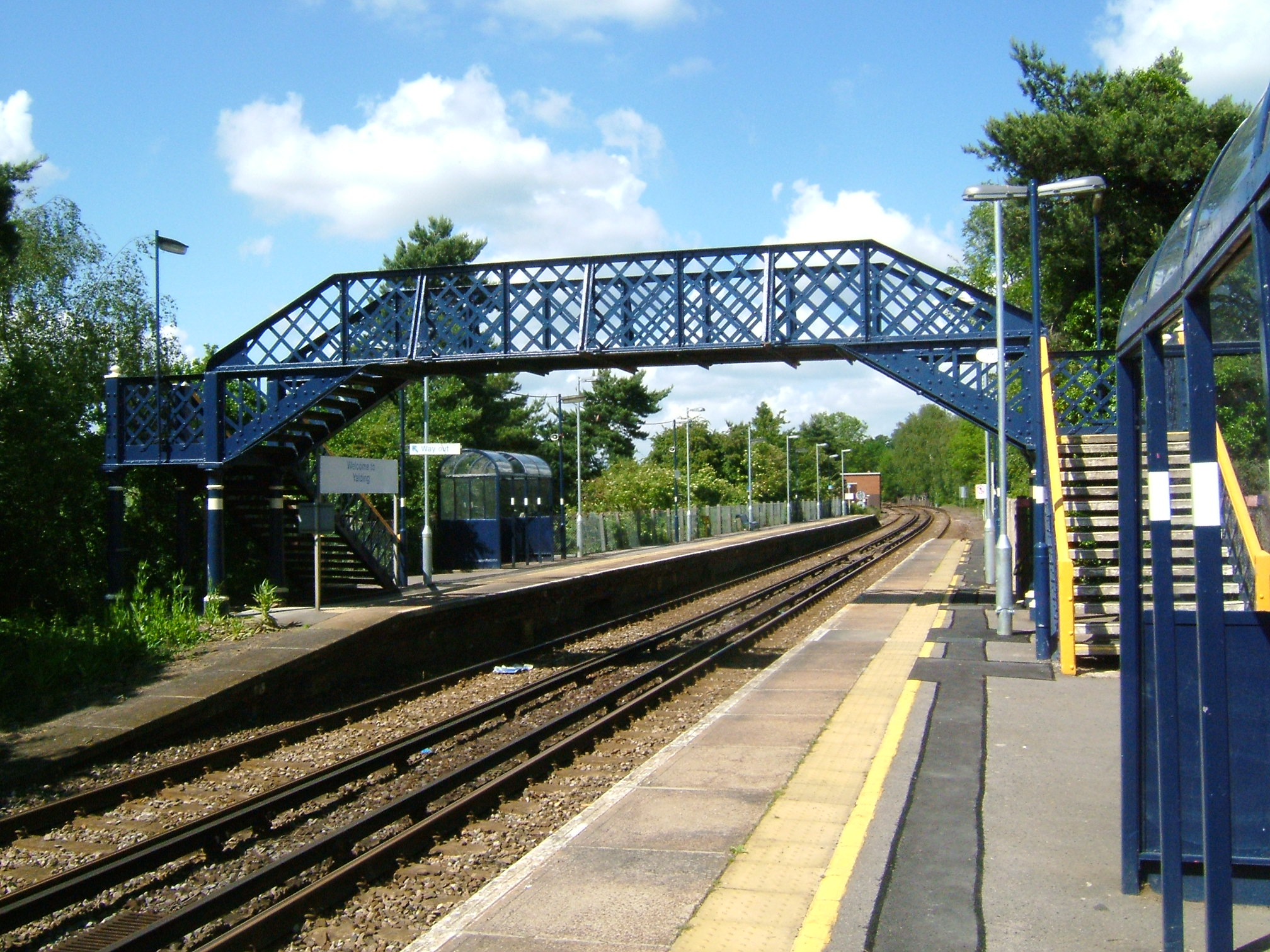

General information
- Location: Yalding, Maidstone; England
- Coordinates: 51.226°N 0.412°E
- Grid reference: TQ685502
- Manager: Southeastern
- Platforms: 2

Other information
- Station code: YAL
- Classification: DfT category F1

History
- Opened: 25 September 1844
- Original company: South Eastern Railway
- Post-grouping: Southern Railway

Passengers
- 2021/22: ▲29,968
- 2022/23: ▼29,228
- 2023/24: ▲37,554
- 2024/25: ▲42,188
- 2025/26: ▲45,902
Location
Notes
- Passenger statistics from the Office of Rail and Road

Yalding railway station is on the Medway Valley Line in Kent, England, serving the village of Yalding. It is 38 miles 19 chains (61.5 km) down the line from London Charing Cross via Paddock Wood and is situated between Beltring and Wateringbury. The station and all trains that call are operated by Southeastern.

== History ==
The station opened on 25 September 1844 when the South Eastern Railway opened the line between Paddock Wood and Maidstone West. The line was originally single track but was doubled in 1846. In 1897 there were two platforms joined by a footbridge, a signal box and sidings both sides of the running lines. The goods yard was able to accommodate most types of goods including live stock and was equipped with a 1¼ ton crane. A camping coach was positioned here by the Southern Region from 1962 to 1967, from 1963 onwards it was a Pullman camping coach.

== Facilities ==
Yalding station is unstaffed. The station is fitted with a self-service ticket machine as well as modern help points on the platforms. Seated areas are available on both platforms and train information screens are provided for running information. The station has a small free car park located outside the station as well as a small cycle storage area. There is a level crossing on the road outside the ststion.

The station used to have an APTIS-equipped ticket office (on the southbound platform) but this closed in 1989 and the building was then used for commercial purposes but has recently become disused.

No regular buses stop outside the station although Arriva Southern Counties routes 6 & 6X to Maidstone and Tunbridge Wells (including both Tunbridge Wells Hospital and Maidstone Hospital) stop a short walk away on Maidstone Road in Nettlestead Green.

== Services ==
All services at Yalding are operated by Southeastern using Class 375 EMUs.

The typical off-peak service in trains per hour is:

- 2 tph to Strood via Maidstone West
- 2 tph to Paddock Wood

A small number of morning, mid afternoon and late evening trains continue beyond Paddock Wood to Tonbridge.

On Sundays, the service is reduced to hourly in each direction.

| Preceding station | National Rail | Following station |
|---|---|---|
| Wateringbury | Southeastern Medway Valley Line | Beltring |
