= Tovil railway station =

Disused railway station in Kent, England

Coordinates: 51.2665°N 0.5096°E

Tovil

General information
- Location: Tovil, Maidstone, Kent; England
- Grid reference: TQ751549
- Platforms: 2

Other information
- Status: Disused

History
- Pre-grouping: South Eastern Railway
- Post-grouping: Southern Railway

Key dates
- 1 January 1884: Station opened
- 1943: Station closed
Location

Tovil station is a closed railway station on the Medway Valley Line. The station opened in 1884 and closed in 1943.

== History ==
The Medway Valley Line opened from Paddock Wood to Maidstone on 25 September 1844. In the 1900s, a branch line was constructed to serve Tovil Goods station, the only part of the Headcorn and Maidstone Junction Light Railway ever constructed. Tovil station was located just south of the junction of the branch from Tovil Goods, which faced towards Maidstone West. Tovil signal box closed in 1929. The station closed in 1943 and was demolished soon afterwards. The short branch line to Tovil Goods closed in 1977.

In 2008, it was suggested that the station should be re-opened.

Preceding station	Disused railways	Following station
Maidstone West	British Rail; Southern Region; Medway Valley Line	East Farleigh
