= Cuxton railway station =

Railway station in Kent, England

Cuxton
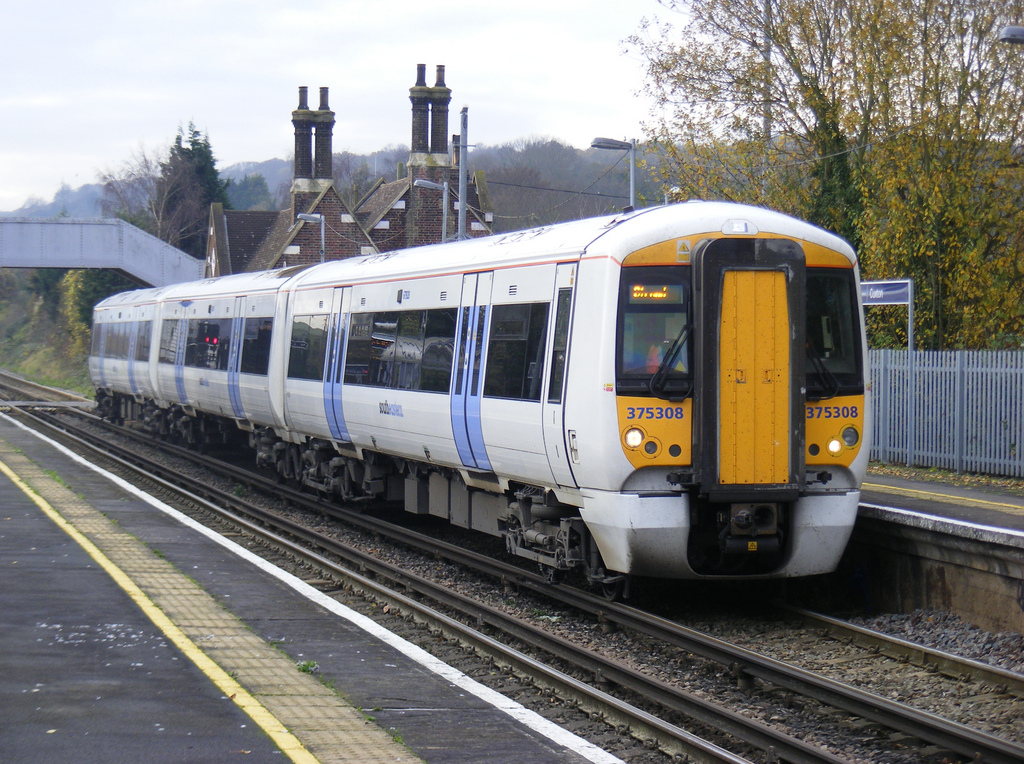

General information
- Location: Cuxton, Medway; England
- Coordinates: 51.374°N 0.462°E
- Grid reference: TQ714667
- Manager: Southeastern
- Platforms: 2

Other information
- Station code: CUX
- Classification: DfT category F2

History
- Opened: 18 June 1856

Passengers
- 2020/21: ▼26,064
- 2021/22: ▲46,312
- 2022/23: ▲48,600
- 2023/24: ▲55,970
- 2024/25: ▲60,952
Location
Notes
- Passenger statistics from the Office of Rail and Road

Cuxton railway station is on the Medway Valley Line in Kent, England, and lies well to the east of the village of Cuxton. It is 33 miles 36 chains (53.8 km) down the line from London Charing Cross via Strood and is situated between Strood and Halling. The station and all trains that serve the station are operated by Southeastern.

== History ==
The APTIS-equipped ticket office, in an imposing building on the northbound platform, closed in September 1989; the building remains disused and is in poor condition although some efforts have been made in recent years to stem the decay and deter vandalism.

A PERTIS (Permit to Travel) ticket machine is located at the entrance to the northbound platform; this was installed in 2007.

The wooden level crossing gates were replaced with manually operated barriers controlled from the signalbox.

== Services ==
All services at Cuxton are operated by Southeastern using Class 375 EMUs.

The typical off-peak service in trains per hour is:

- 2 tph to Strood
- 2 tph to Paddock Wood via Maidstone West

A small number of morning, mid afternoon and late evening trains continue beyond Paddock Wood to Tonbridge.

On Sundays, the service is reduced to hourly in each direction.

Preceding station	National Rail	Following station
Strood	Southeastern Medway Valley Line	Halling
