= East Farleigh railway station =

Railway station in Kent, England

Coordinates: 51.255°N 0.485°E

East Farleigh
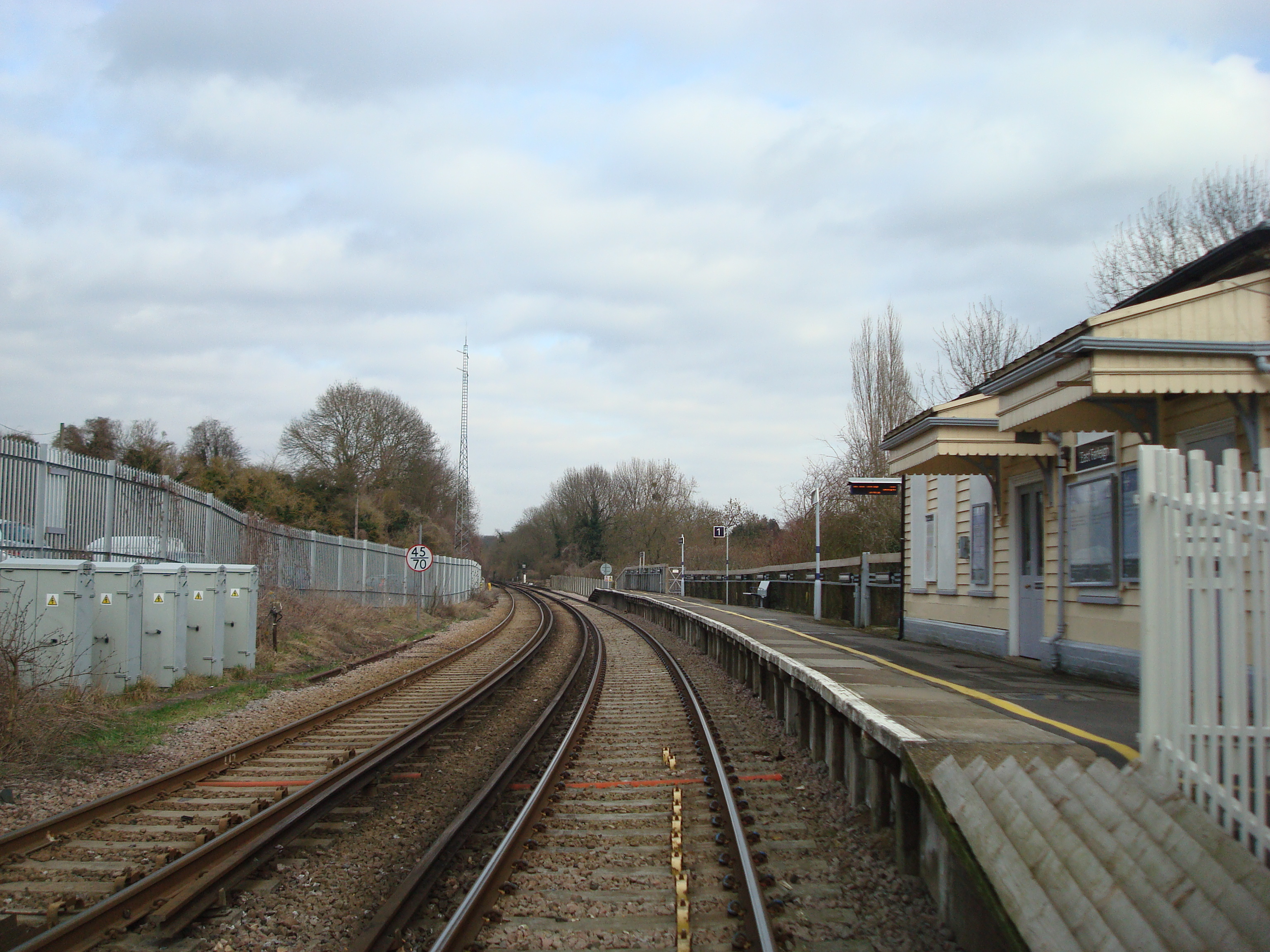

General information
- Location: East Farleigh, Maidstone; England
- Grid reference: TQ734536
- Manager: Southeastern
- Platforms: 2

Other information
- Station code: EFL
- Classification: DfT category F2

History
- Opened: 25 September 1844

Passengers
- 2021/22: ▲23,248
- 2022/23: ▲28,764
- 2023/24: ▲34,402
- 2024/25: ▲38,974
- 2025/26: ▲46,276
Location
Notes
- Passenger statistics from the Office of Rail and Road

East Farleigh railway station is on the Medway Valley Line in Kent, England, located to the south-west of Maidstone and close to the village of East Farleigh, on the opposite (south) bank of the River Medway, though the station is actually located in Barming parish. It is 42 miles 75 chains (69.1 km) down the line from London Charing Cross via Paddock Wood. The station and all trains that serve the station are operated by Southeastern.

East Farleigh station is about 50 yards from the medieval East Farleigh Bridge taking foot and road passengers across the river, one of only four such bridges between Maidstone and Tonbridge.

The station has two platforms, staggered to either side of a level crossing.

On the southbound platform is a signal box which remains to control the level crossing. The old ticket office, located in a wooden building on the southbound platform, closed in 1989; this was APTIS-equipped from 1987 until closure. This building then remained disused for many years though in good condition. In 2007, a PERTIS permit to travel ticket machine was installed at the entrance to the southbound platform, which is behind the signal box.

Facilities on the northbound platform are limited to a waiting shelter. A footbridge spans the tracks and is accessed from the northbound platform.

== In Film ==
A twelve-minute Nationwide (TV series) segment, ' Meet the Commuters', featured the station. Bernard Falk interviewed some of its commuters, the famous ticket attendant, Spud Murphy, and later the famous author, Michael Gilbert.

== Services ==
All services at East Farleigh are operated by Southeastern using Class 375 EMUs.

The typical off-peak service in trains per hour is:

- 2 tph to Strood via Maidstone West
- 2 tph to Paddock Wood

A small number of morning, mid afternoon and late evening trains continue beyond Paddock Wood to Tonbridge.

On Sundays, the service is reduced to hourly in each direction.

Preceding station	National Rail	Following station
Maidstone West	Southeastern Medway Valley Line	Wateringbury
	Disused railways	
Tovil	British Rail Southern Region Medway Valley Line	Teston Halt
