= New Hythe =

Coordinates: 51°18′36″N 0°26′53″E

- Village
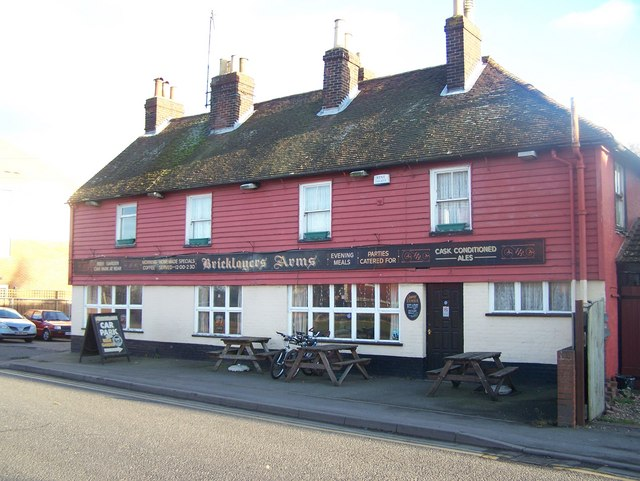
- The Bricklayers Arms, New Hythe

- Location within Kent
- OS grid reference: TQ 70930 59869
- Civil parish: East Malling and Larkfield
- District: Tonbridge and Malling
- Shire county: Kent
- Region: South East
- Country: England
- Sovereign state: United Kingdom
- Post town: Aylesford
- Postcode district: ME20
- Dialling code: 01622
- Police: Kent
- Fire: Kent
- Ambulance: South East Coast
- UK Parliament: Chatham and Aylesford

New Hythe is a village in mid-Kent, England on the banks of the River Medway approximately 5 miles (8.0 km) northwest of the county town of Maidstone. It derives its name from the Old English word Hythe, meaning haven or landing place. It is split between the civil parishes of East Malling and Larkfield, and Ditton.

== Recent history ==
During the 20th century it held a relatively prominent position in the local economy due to the Aylesford Paper Mill situated there. The mill was one of Europe's largest, but closed in 2015. It was also the home to Meridian's newsroom and studio for the south eastern television region from 1993 until 2004, when the station relocated its Kent operations to the Maidstone Studios in Vinters Park, Maidstone, the former home of the previous southern ITV franchise holder TVS.

Once distinct and visibly separate from its surrounding villages, the large scale development of neighbouring Larkfield from the 1960s onwards, the building of Lunsford Park in the 1970s and 1980s, and most recently the development of the Leybourne Lakes area, has seen New Hythe become effectively subsumed into the general Larkfield conurbation.

== Transport ==
New Hythe has a railway station on the Medway Valley line and is close to Junction 4 on the M20 motorway.
