= Halling railway station =

Railway station in Kent, England

Coordinates: 51.352°N 0.445°E

Halling
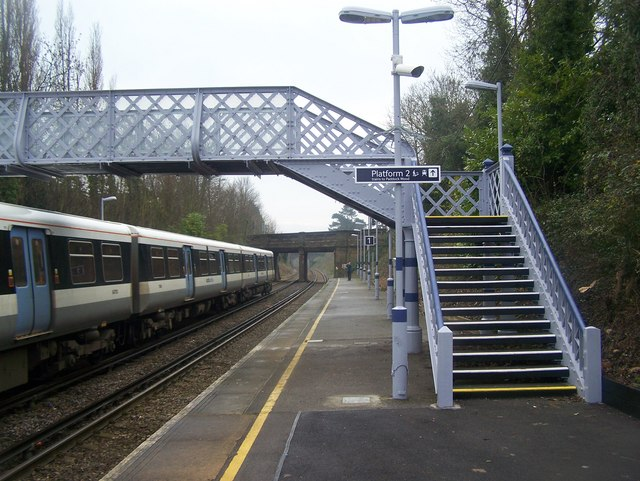

General information
- Location: Halling, Medway; England
- Grid reference: TQ703643
- Manager: Southeastern
- Platforms: 2

Other information
- Station code: HAI
- Classification: DfT category F2

History
- Opened: 1 March 1890

Passengers
- 2020/21: ▼31,708
- 2021/22: ▲63,266
- 2022/23: ▼61,786
- 2023/24: ▲86,704
- 2024/25: ▲0.109 million
Location
Notes
- Passenger statistics from the Office of Rail and Road

Halling railway station is on the Medway Valley Line in Kent, England, and lies a little to the north of the village of Halling. It is 35 miles 18 chains (56.7 km) down the line from London Charing Cross via Strood and is situated between Cuxton and Snodland. The station and all trains that serve the station are operated by Southeastern.

The APTIS-equipped ticket office, in a building on the northbound platform, closed in September 1989; the building, after a lengthy period of disuse, was converted to office accommodation but is again disused.

A PERTIS (Permit to Travel) ticket machine is located just outside the entrance to the station, which is on the northbound platform; this was installed in 2007.

== Services ==
All services at Halling are operated by Southeastern using Class 375 EMUs.

The typical off-peak service in trains per hour is:

- 2 tph to Strood
- 2 tph to Paddock Wood via Maidstone West

A small number of morning, mid afternoon and late evening trains continue beyond Paddock Wood to Tonbridge.

On Sundays, the service is reduced to hourly in each direction.

| Preceding station | National Rail | Following station |
|---|---|---|
| Cuxton | Southeastern Medway Valley Line | Snodland |
