= Snodland railway station =

Railway station in Kent, England

Coordinates: 51.330°N 0.448°E

Snodland
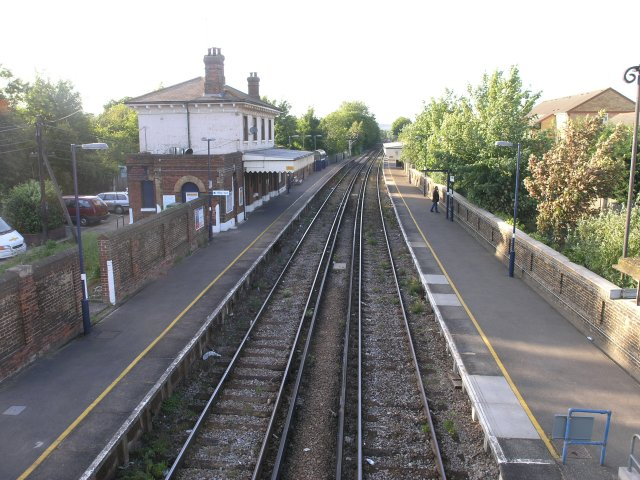

General information
- Location: Snodland, Tonbridge and Malling; England
- Grid reference: TQ706618
- Manager: Southeastern
- Platforms: 2

Other information
- Station code: SDA
- Classification: DfT category F2

History
- Opened: 18 June 1856

Passengers
- 2020/21: ▼98,450
- 2021/22: ▲0.214 million
- 2022/23: ▼0.186 million
- 2023/24: ▲0.250 million
- 2024/25: ▲0.276 million
Location
Notes
- Passenger statistics from the Office of Rail and Road

Snodland railway station is on the Medway Valley Line in Kent, England. It serves the town of Snodland, which lies some way to the west. The station is 36 miles 59 chains (59.1 km) down the line from London Charing Cross via Strood and it is situated between Halling and New Hythe. All trains that serve the station, and the station itself, are operated by Southeastern.

== History ==
The station was built in 1856, for the South Eastern Railway. It is a Grade II listed building, with two storeys: the lower floors were for the station offices and public rooms and the upper floors that were designed as the station master's flat. The station is located just to the north of the High Street, with a passenger footbridge and a level crossing over the railway.

The former Queen's Head Hotel, adjacent to the station, was built to serve railway passengers. It closed in 1991 is now a residential care facility.

Snodland was once equipped with a goods shed and sidings located behind platform 2 of which the remaining supports the platform 2 canopy. To the immediate north of the station a pair of goods loops, remnants of which can be seen. The late 19th century signal box alongside the station has been closed and is now a listed building.

The ticket office was originally closed around 1990, and in 2007, a PERTIS (Permit to Travel) ticket machine was installed just outside the entrance to the northbound platform. However, the ticket office was reopened in September 2016.

== Services ==
All services at Snodland are operated by Southeastern using Class 375 and 395 EMUs.

The typical off-peak service in trains per hour is:

- 2 tph to Strood
- 2 tph to Paddock Wood via Maidstone West

A small number of morning, mid afternoon and late evening trains continue beyond Paddock Wood to Tonbridge.

The station is also served by two peak hour high speed services in each direction between London St Pancras International and Maidstone West.

On Sundays, the service is reduced to hourly in each direction.

Preceding station	National Rail	Following station
Halling	Southeastern Medway Valley Line	New Hythe
Strood	Southeastern High Speed 1 Peak Hours Only	Maidstone West
