= New Hythe railway station =

Railway station in Kent, England

Coordinates: 51.313°N 0.455°E

New Hythe
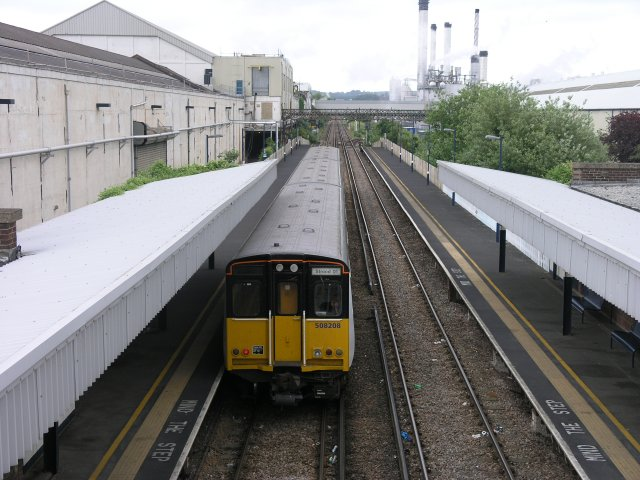

General information
- Location: New Hythe, Tonbridge and Malling; England
- Grid reference: TQ711599
- Managed by: Southeastern
- Platforms: 2

Other information
- Station code: NHE
- Classification: DfT category F2

History
- Opened: 9 December 1929

Passengers
- 2020/21: ▼50,980
- 2021/22: ▲0.128 million
- 2022/23: 0.128 million
- 2023/24: ▲0.160 million
- 2024/25: ▲0.184 million
Location
Notes
- Passenger statistics from the Office of Rail and Road

New Hythe railway station is on the Medway Valley Line in Kent, England, serving the village of New Hythe. It is 38 miles 3 chains (61.2 km) down the line from London Charing Cross via Strood and is situated between Snodland and Aylesford. The station and all trains that serve the station are operated by Southeastern.

The APTIS-equipped ticket office, in a 1930s building on the northbound platform, closed in September 1989 and subsequently became derelict. In 2007, a PERTIS (Permit to Travel) ticket machine was installed at the entrance to the northbound platform.

== History ==
Although the line between Strood and Maidstone, on which New Hythe lies, was completed in 1856, the station was not opened until 9 December 1929, when New Hythe Halt, a timber-built halt, was opened to serve the huge paper mill complex which had been established beside the line. The present, more substantial station was constructed in 1936, and the line was electrified in 1939.

== Services ==
All services at New Hythe are operated by Southeastern using Class 375 EMUs.

The typical off-peak service in trains per hour is:

- 2 tph to Strood
- 2 tph to Paddock Wood via Maidstone West

A small number of morning, mid afternoon and late evening trains continue beyond Paddock Wood to Tonbridge.

On Sundays, the service is reduced to hourly in each direction.

Preceding station	National Rail	Following station
Snodland	Southeastern Medway Valley Line	Aylesford
