= Beltring railway station =

Railway station in Kent, England

Beltring
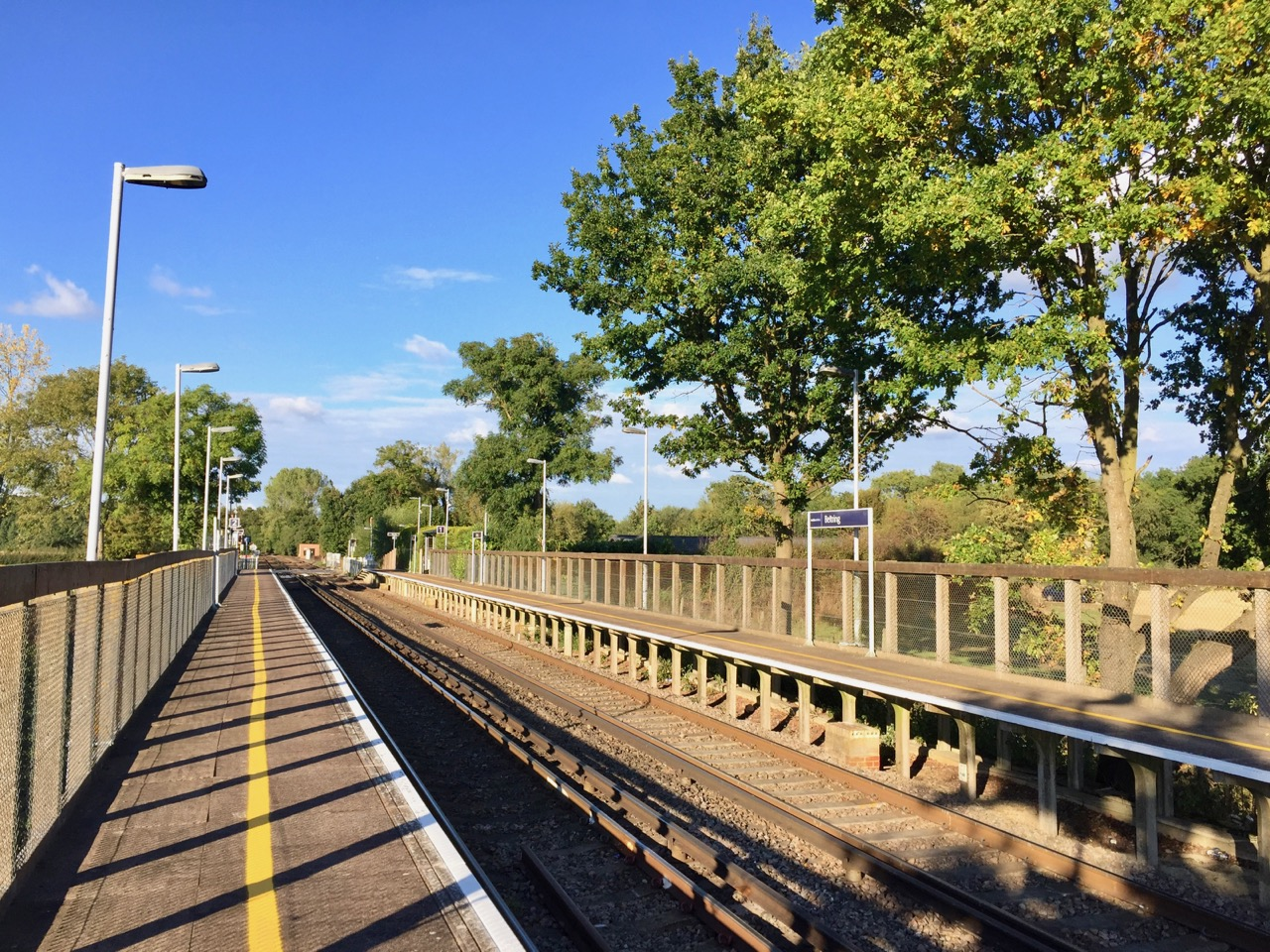

General information
- Location: Beltring, Maidstone; England
- Coordinates: 51.204587°N 0.405887°E
- Grid reference: TQ680477
- Manager: Southeastern
- Platforms: 2

Other information
- Station code: BEG
- Classification: DfT category F2

History
- Opened: 1 September 1909

Passengers
- 2021/22: ▲10,560
- 2022/23: ▲12,226
- 2023/24: ▲15,040
- 2024/25: ▼14,532
- 2025/26: ▼13,354
Location
Notes
- Passenger statistics from the Office of Rail and Road

Beltring railway station is on the Medway Valley Line in Kent, England, serving the village of Beltring. It is 36 miles 50 chains (58.9 km) down the line from London Charing Cross via Paddock Wood and is situated between Paddock Wood and Yalding. The station and all trains that call are operated by Southeastern.

== History ==
Beltring station opened later than the others on the line (which had been opened in 1844): its opening date was 1 September 1909. The halt originally had platforms built of wooden sleepers. It originally had a freight siding; used for the forwarding of farm produce until 5 June 1961. The station was then named Beltring and Branbridges Halt. It consists of concrete platforms with shelters. It serves a predominantly rural area: the nearest settlements being the small villages of Beltring, Branbridges, Laddingford and East Peckham.

== Facilities ==
Beltring station is unstaffed and facilities are limited. The station is fitted with a self-service ticket machine as well as modern help points on the platforms. Seated areas are available on both platforms and train information screens are provided for running information.

No regular buses stop outside the station although Arriva Southern Counties routes 6 & 6A to Maidstone and Tunbridge Wells and Go-Coach route 208 to Tonbridge both stop a short walk away on Branbridges Road.

== Services ==
All services at Beltring are operated by Southeastern using Class 375 EMUs.

The typical off-peak service in trains per hour is:

- 2 tph to Strood via Maidstone West
- 2 tph to Paddock Wood

A small number of morning, mid afternoon and late evening trains continue beyond Paddock Wood to Tonbridge.

On Sundays, the service is reduced to hourly in each direction.

Plans mooted in the mid-2000s to close Beltring station, or at least replace the existing services with a token service (such as one train a week in each direction) have been withdrawn.

Preceding station	National Rail	Following station
Yalding	Southeastern Medway Valley Line	Paddock Wood
