= Aylesford railway station =

Railway station in Kent, England

Aylesford
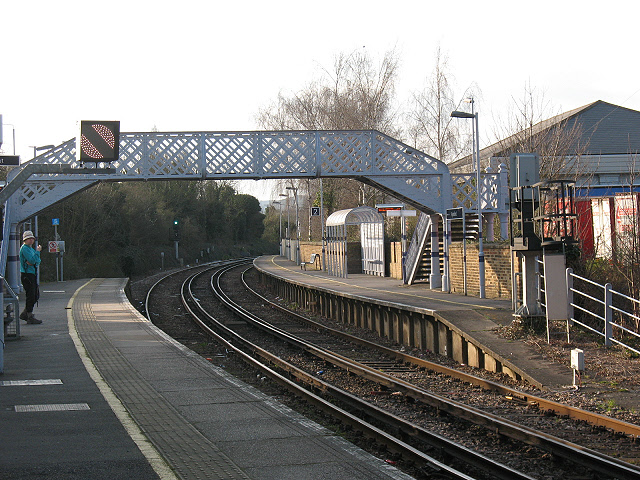

General information
- Location: Aylesford, Tonbridge and Malling; England
- Coordinates: 51°18′05″N 00°27′58″E
- Grid reference: TQ720586
- Manager: Southeastern
- Platforms: 2

Other information
- Station code: AYL
- Classification: DfT category F2

History
- Opened: 18 June 1856

Passengers
- 2020/21: ▼41,442
- 2021/22: ▲0.118 million
- 2022/23: ▼0.109 million
- 2023/24: ▲0.152 million
- 2024/25: ▲0.185 million
Location
Notes
- Passenger statistics from the Office of Rail and Road

Aylesford railway station serves the village of Aylesford, in Kent, England. It is a stop on the Medway Valley Line, 38 miles 74 chains (62.6 km) down the line from London Charing Cross, via Strood; it is situated between New Hythe and Maidstone Barracks. The station is operated by Southeastern, along with all trains that serve it.

== History ==
Aylesford was opened by the South Eastern Railway, which merged with local rival London, Chatham & Dover Railway on 1 January 1899 to form the South Eastern & Chatham Railway. The station became part of the Southern Railway during the grouping of 1923, and was passed on to the Southern Region of British Railways on nationalisation in 1948.

When sectorisation was introduced in the 1980s, the station was served by Network SouthEast until the privatisation of British Rail. On 21 October 1988, a plaque was unveiled at Aylesford in the presence of the Network SouthEast director, Chris Green, to commemorate completion of the project to restore the station building to its original 1856 condition. The project cost £250,000, £50,000 of which was contributed by the Railway Heritage Trust. During the ceremony, Green announced plans for a £4 million resignalling package for the Medway Valley line to replace the semaphore signals by a multi-aspect colour light system controlled from Maidstone West box.

=== Buildings ===
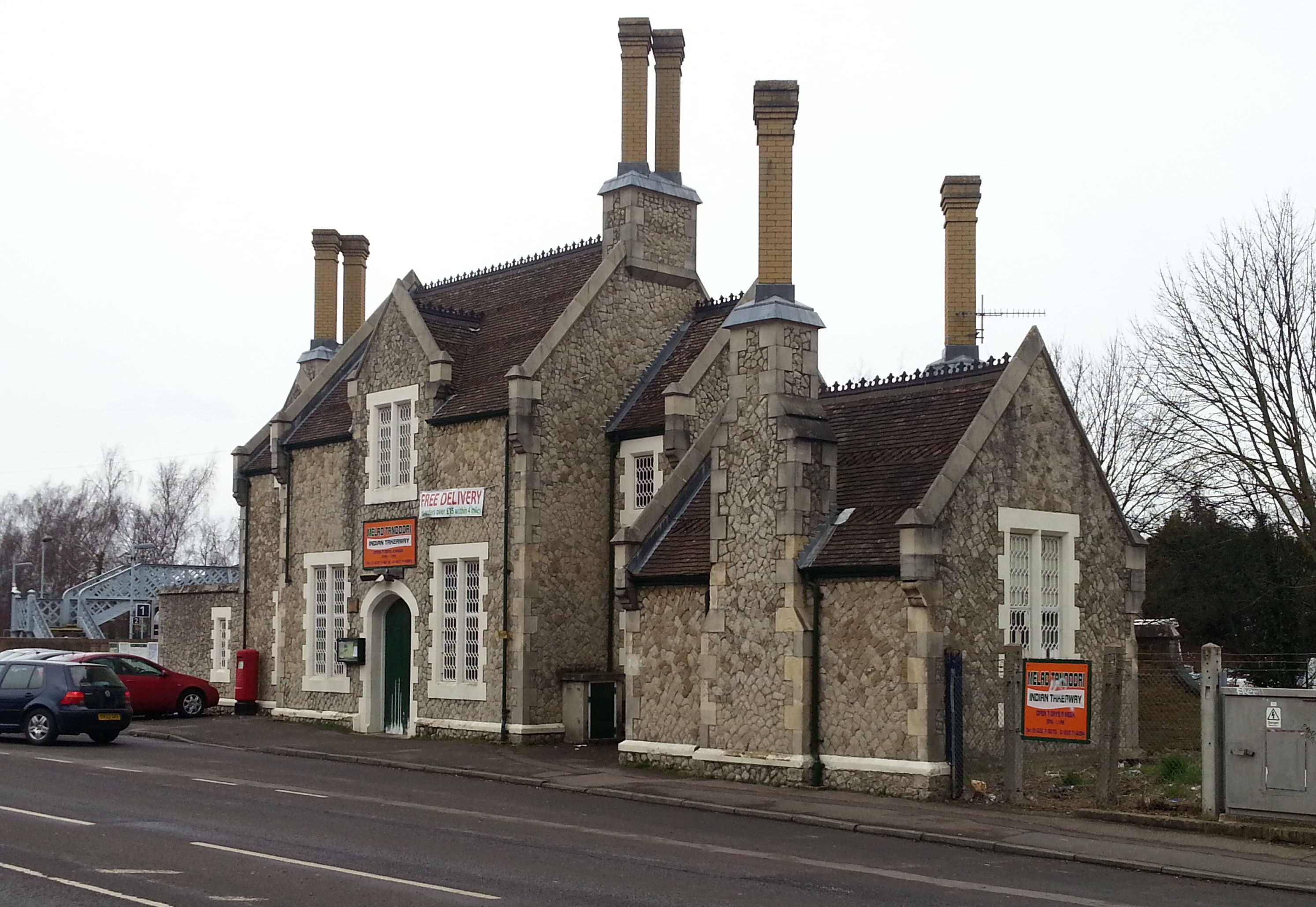
Aylesford station building

The section of the line surrounding Aylesford station passes through what was part of the Preston Hall Estate, the then home of Edward Betts, the railway contractor that built this part of the Medway Valley Line. Consequently, the station building is much grander than other country stations along the line. The station buildings are gabled and highly decorated, built in Kentish ragstone with Caen stone dressings, in part reflecting a simplified version of the style of Preston Hall. Windows replicate those at Aylesford Priory.

Following restoration and refurbishment, the station building received an Ian Allan award in 2001, commemorated by a plaque in the waiting room/booking office. The ticket office, in a building on the northbound platform, was closed in September 1989; an Indian restaurant, incorporating a fried chicken takeaway, was subsequently established in the building. In 2007, a permit to travel ticket machine was installed just inside the entrance to the station, on the northbound platform. In early 2016 the Permit to Travel machine was removed with plans to replace it with a ticket machine.

== Services ==
All services at Aylesford are operated by Southeastern using Class 375 electric multiple units.

The typical off-peak service in trains per hour is:

- 2 tph to Strood
- 2 tph to Paddock Wood, via Maidstone West

A small number of morning, mid afternoon and late evening trains continue beyond Paddock Wood to Tonbridge.

On Sundays, the service is reduced to hourly in each direction.

Preceding station	National Rail	Following station
New Hythe	Southeastern Medway Valley Line	Maidstone Barracks
