= Paddock Wood =

Town and civil parish in Kent, England

Coordinates: 51°10′44″N 0°23′16″E

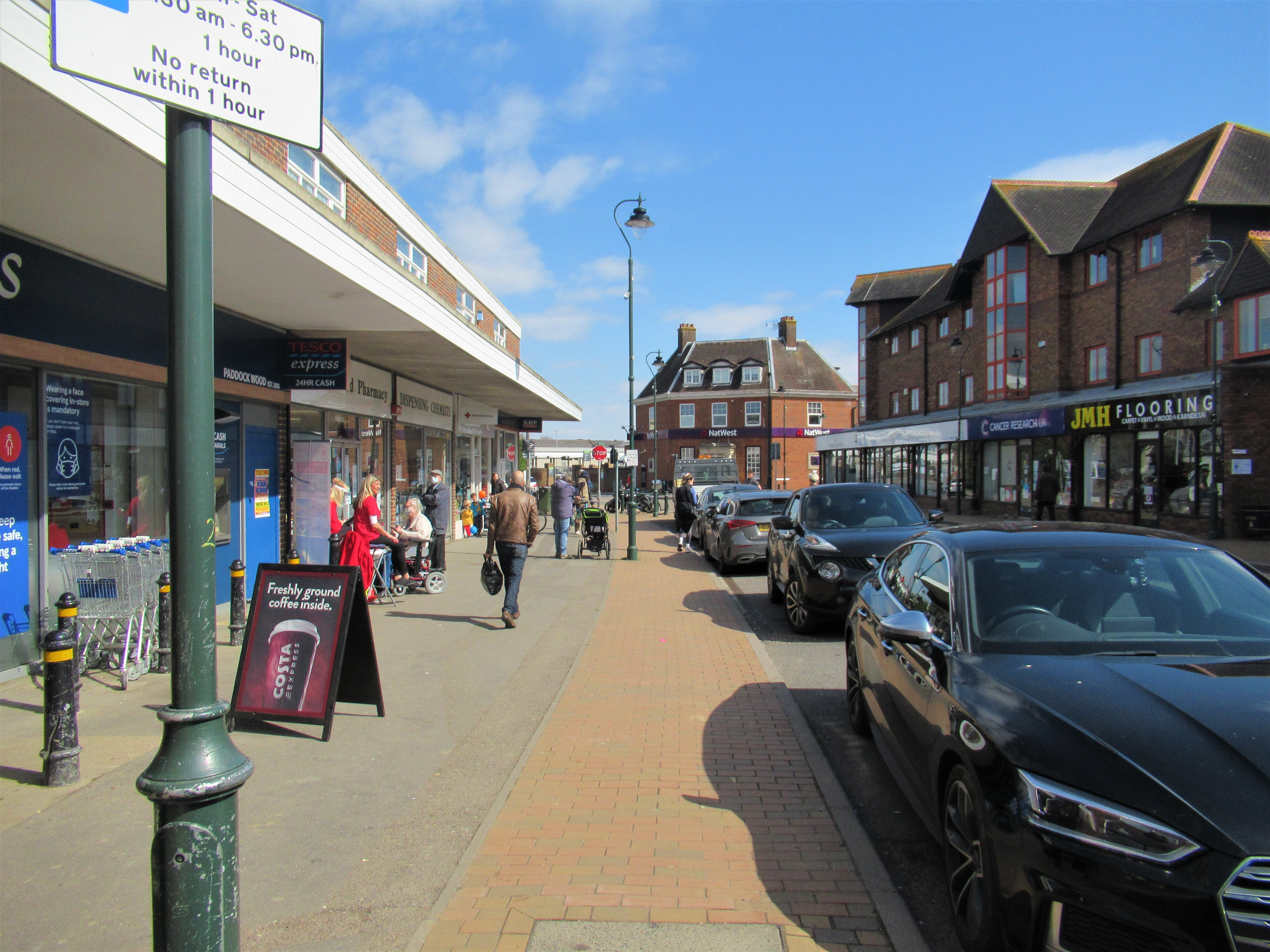
- Commercial Road

- Location within Kent
- Population: 8,263 (2001); 8,253 (2011)
- OS grid reference: TQ675445
- Civil parish: Paddock Wood
- District: Tunbridge Wells
- Shire county: Kent
- Region: South East
- Country: England
- Sovereign state: United Kingdom
- Post town: TONBRIDGE
- Postcode district: TN12
- Dialling code: 01892
- Police: Kent
- Fire: Kent
- Ambulance: South East Coast
- UK Parliament: Tunbridge Wells

Paddock Wood is a town and civil parish in the borough of Tunbridge Wells in Kent, England, about 8 miles (13 km) southwest of Maidstone. At the 2011 Census it had a population of 8,253 falling to 8160 at the 2021 Census. Paddock Wood is a centre for hop growing.

== History ==
Paddock Wood developed as a settlement during the second half of the 19th century as a result of the local hops industry. By 1900 it was a local transport hub with three railway lines at the railway station.

== Government ==
Paddock Wood has three tiers of local government: town (parish), borough and county.

=== Borough council ===
Since 1974 Paddock Wood has formed part of the Borough of Tunbridge Wells. The borough is governed by a 48-member council. The town elects 4 borough councillors, with 2 each for the Paddock Wood East and Paddock Wood West wards. As of July 2022, one is a member of the Labour Party, one is a member of the Liberal Democrats one is a member of local action group Tunbridge Wells Alliance, and one is an Independent.

=== County council ===
The upper tier of local government is provided by Kent County Council. The county council has 81 members, with each representing an electoral district. Paddock Wood forms part of the electoral district of Tunbridge Wells Rural.

== Geography ==
The commercial areas of Paddock Wood are separated by the railway line.

To the South of the railway lies Commercial Road which runs north east to south west through the town, and is the main shopping street. At the north east end of the street is the entrance to the Railway Station. Commercial Road is home to the branches of several banks, a variety of take-aways, a restaurant and a number of small shops. To the east of Commercial Road, runs Maidstone Road. This road runs north to Beltring and East Peckham, and south to Matfield, and is the main route into and out of the town.

To the north of the railway line lie the industrial areas. Eldon Way Industrial Estate can be found to the east and is home to British Car Auctions, among others. To the west is the larger Transfesa Road and Paddock Wood Distribution Centre. This is the home to a number of companies including Gabriel Chemie UK Ltd, Norman Collett, CoolChain, Mack Multiples, Warburtons and a Whirlpool warehouse, which was destroyed in a large fire in early July 2005.

== Culture and community ==
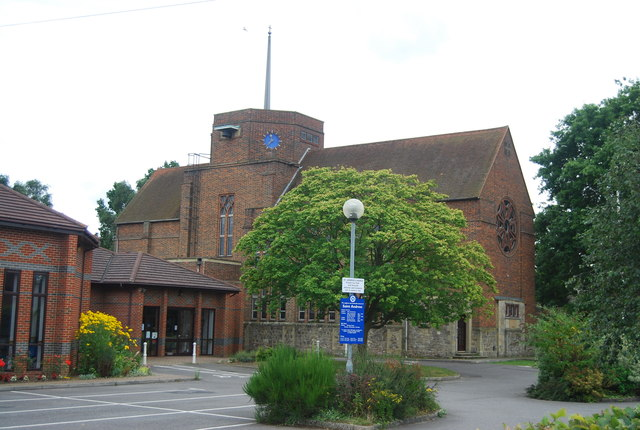
St Andrew's Church

Mascalls Gallery, was a public art gallery opened in 2006. It closed in 2016, due to a lack of funds.

The town had a department store, Barsley's, which had been in operation on Commercial Road since 1900 selling clothing, furniture, toys and more. It remained family-owned for the entirety of its trading. It closed in 2026, blaming "growing economic pressure".

Although technically in Beltring, in the civil parish of East Peckham, the nearby Hop Farm hosts many events such as the circus, monster truck racing and music festivals.

St Andrew's Church is a joint Anglican and Methodist church located on Maidstone Road.

Local news and television programmes are provided by BBC South East and ITV Meridian. Television signals are received from either the Tunbridge Wells or Bluebell Hill TV transmitters, BBC London and ITV London can also be received from the Crystal Palace TV transmitters.

Local radio stations are BBC Radio Kent on 96.7 FM, Heart South on 103.1 FM, Gold on 603 AM and KMFM West Kent on 96.2 FM. As of November 2021, Tonbridge, Tunbridge Wells, Paddock Wood and Southborough are now served by community radio station West Kent Radio broadcasting on 106.7FM and 95.5FM.

The town is served by the local newspaper, Kent and Sussex Courier.

== Transport ==
Paddock Wood is served by Paddock Wood railway station, is on the B2160 and B2161 roads, and is not too far from the A228, A264, A21 and A26 roads. The A21 in the area suffers from congestion and traffic problems..

== Education ==
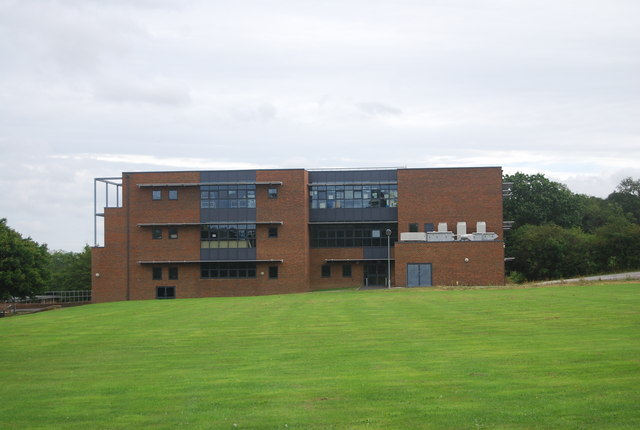
Mascalls Academy

The town's main primary school is Leigh Academy, Paddock Wood (formerly Paddock Wood Primary School) which was originally built in 1909, and has approximately 600 pupils.

The town's main secondary school is Leigh Academy, Mascalls (formerly Mascalls School), a comprehensive secondary school which opened in 1956, and has approximately 1400 pupils.

== Literary references ==
Paddock Wood Railway station appears in the novel Dombey and Son by Charles Dickens where, in chapter 55, the character of Mr Carker accidentally falls under a train at the station and is killed. Some Dickens scholars believe that Paddock Wood is the rural railway station described in Dombey and Son. Some believe that one of Charles Dickens's children was buried in the graveyard as it says on the sign at the entrance.

== Notable people ==
- Philip Martin Brown (b 1956), actor, lives in Paddock Wood.
- John Brunt (1922–1944), British Army officer and Victoria Cross recipient lived in Paddock Wood.
- Frederick E. Morgan (1894–1967), British Army officer, born in Paddock Wood.
- Sammy Rimington (b 1942), jazz musician, born in Paddock Wood.

== See also ==
- Listed buildings in Paddock Wood
