= Beltring =

Village in Kent, England

Coordinates: 51.203660°N 0.397650°E

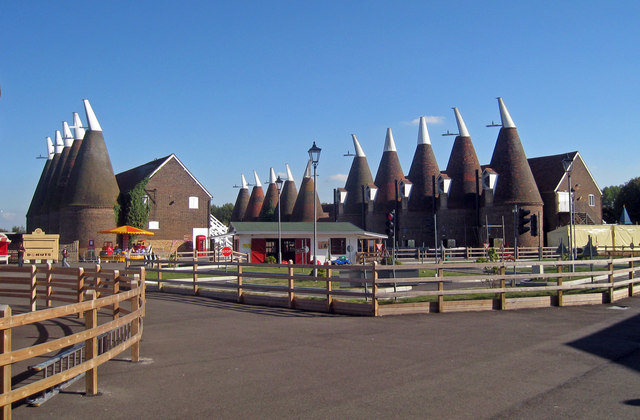
- Oast Houses at the Hop Farm

- Location within Kent
- Civil parish: East Peckham
- District: Tonbridge and Malling
- Shire county: Kent
- Region: South East
- Country: England
- Sovereign state: United Kingdom
- Post town: Tonbridge
- Postcode district: TN12
- Police: Kent
- Fire: Kent
- Ambulance: South East Coast
- UK Parliament: Tonbridge

Beltring is a village in the local government district of Tonbridge and Malling in Kent, England. It is in the civil parish of East Peckham.

Beltring is known for the annual War and peace show which takes place at The Hop Farm Country Park. Until recently the farm was owned by the Whitbread brewery, but it is now a privately owned country park, and boasts the world's largest collection of Oast houses.

Beltring & Branbridges Halt railway station opened on 1 September 1909, on the Medway Valley Line.
