= St Andrew's Church, Paddock Wood =

Joint Anglican/Methodist church in Paddock Wood, Kent, England

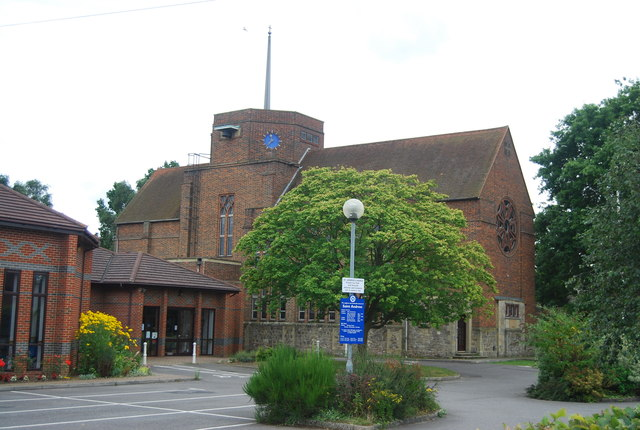

- Location within Kent
- OS grid reference: TQ 66829 44605
- Location: Paddock Wood, Kent
- Country: England
- Denomination: Anglican and Methodist
- Website: standrewspw.org.uk

History
- Status: Parish church

Architecture
- Functional status: Active
- Completed: 1950s

Administration
- Province: Canterbury
- Diocese: Rochester
- Archdeaconry: Tonbridge
- Deanery: Paddock Wood
- Parish: St. Andrew, Paddock Wood

St Andrew's Church is a joint Church of England and Methodist church in Paddock Wood, Kent, England.

== Building ==
The building is built in a post-war brick style, although the design echoes some features of earlier gothic Anglican churches. The rose window at the west end, was designed by Joan Howson in memory of former Paddock Wood resident, John Brunt VC. The northern end of the church complex houses a Fairtrade shop.

== History ==
The original St Andrew's Church was opened on 28 October 1851. It was located at 51.180106°N 0.392049°E, approximately 600 meters from the current church. The street next to its former site is still called "Church Road", and the graveyard is extant, known as the "Old Churchyard". The church was severely damaged during World War II, as a German bomber hit it directly on the night of 4 November 1940, causing the roof to collapse. It was later demolished. In the meantime, the nearby school hall was consecrated as a temporary church.

The current church was built in the 1950s, on a different site further south. It took until 1953 to get permission from the Ministry of Works to start construction. It was planned to rebuild on the original site but a new site was deemed more appropriate. Certain elements of the original church, such as the altar and lectern, were salvaged and reused for the current building. The old church's churchyard continued to be used for burials until the late 1950s when a new burial ground was consecrated near the new St Andrew's Church by the Bishop of Tonbridge in 1959, though certain lineal reserved burial rights still exist for individual burials in the old burial ground.

It was originally built for Church of England worship alone. In 1979, the local Methodist chapel closed. The Methodists entered into a local ecumenical partnership with the Anglicans of St Andrew's in order for them to also be able to worship together with joint services.

== See also ==
- List of places of worship in Tunbridge Wells (borough)
