= Listed buildings in Paddock Wood =

Civil Parish in Kent, England

Paddock Wood is a town and civil parish in the Borough of Tunbridge Wells of Kent, England. It contains 30 listed buildings that are recorded in the National Heritage List for England. Of these all 30 are grade II.

This list is based on the information retrieved online from Historic England.

== Key ==
Grade	Criteria
I	Buildings that are of exceptional interest
II*	Particularly important buildings of more than special interest
II	Buildings that are of special interest

== Listing ==
Name	Grade	Location	Type	Completed (Note: The date given is the date used by Historic England as significant for the initial building or that of an important part in the structure's description.)	Date designated	Grid ref. (Note: The grid reference is based on the British national grid reference system, sometimes known as OSGB36, used by the Ordnance Survey.) Geo-coordinates	Notes	Entry number (Note: The "List Entry Number" is a unique number assigned to each listed building and scheduled monument by Historic England.)	Image	Wikidata
Old Mullions	II				24 August 1990	TQ6854445154; 51°10′51″N 0°24′36″E		1254122	Upload Photo	Q26545809
Gates and Gate Piers at Mascalls	II	Badsell Road			24 August 1990	TQ6670144140; 51°10′20″N 0°23′00″E		1261421	Upload Photo	Q26552372
Mascalls	II	Badsell Road			3 March 1971	TQ6669044178; 51°10′21″N 0°22′59″E		1254123	Upload Photo	Q26545810
Sunnycot	II	Badsell Road			3 March 1971	TQ6678544126; 51°10′19″N 0°23′04″E		1254124	Upload Photo	Q26545811
Burnside	II	Church Road			24 August 1990	TQ6782044475; 51°10′30″N 0°23′58″E		1254224	Upload Photo	Q26545907
Rose Cottages	II	1 and 2, Church Road			24 August 1990	TQ6781744324; 51°10′25″N 0°23′57″E		1254226	Upload Photo	Q26545909
Warrington Place Farmhouse	II	Church Road			28 September 1998	TQ6744744751; 51°10′39″N 0°23′39″E		1378385	Upload Photo	Q26658793
The War Memorial	II	Commercial Road	statue		24 August 1990	TQ6709845166; 51°10′53″N 0°23′22″E		1254227	The War Memorial More images	Q26545910
Longbrooks Cottages	II	1 and 2, Longbrooks			24 August 1990	TQ6885143374; 51°09′53″N 0°24′49″E		1254231	Upload Photo	Q26545914
Joys Cottages	II	1 and 2, Lucks Lane			24 August 1990	TQ6812745602; 51°11′06″N 0°24′15″E		1254233	Upload Photo	Q26545916
Little Rhoden	II	Lucks Lane			24 August 1990	TQ6808145505; 51°11′03″N 0°24′13″E		1254234	Upload Photo	Q26545917
Swatlands	II	Lucks Lane			24 August 1990	TQ6763245816; 51°11′13″N 0°23′50″E		1254232	Upload Photo	Q26545915
Barn, Cartshed and Walls About 40 Metres North West of Putlands Farmhouse	II	Cartshed And Walls About 40 Metres North West Of Putlands Farmhouse, Maidstone Road			24 August 1990	TQ6681344480; 51°10′31″N 0°23′06″E		1254236	Upload Photo	Q26545919
Mascalls Pound	II	Maidstone Road			24 August 1990	TQ6689843835; 51°10′10″N 0°23′09″E		1254237	Upload Photo	Q26545920
Oasthouse About 40 Metres South West of Putlands Farmhouse	II	Maidstone Road	hop kiln		24 August 1990	TQ6682244436; 51°10′29″N 0°23′06″E		1261387	Oasthouse About 40 Metres South West of Putlands Farmhouse More images	Q26552343
Oasthouse Immediately South West of Mascalls Pound	II	Maidstone Road			24 August 1990	TQ6688843816; 51°10′09″N 0°23′09″E		1261388	Upload Photo	Q26552344
Putlands Farmhouse Including Garden Walls and Railings to the West	II	Maidstone Road			24 August 1990	TQ6683444468; 51°10′30″N 0°23′07″E		1254235	Upload Photo	Q26545918
Cartshed About 30 Metres North East of the Cottages, Mascalls Court	II	Mascalls Court, Mascalls Court Road			24 August 1990	TQ6783843842; 51°10′09″N 0°23′58″E		1254239	Upload Photo	Q26545922
The Cottages, Mascalls Court	II	Mascalls Court, Mascalls Court Road			24 August 1990	TQ6781543828; 51°10′09″N 0°23′56″E		1254238	Upload Photo	Q26545921
Barn Immediately West of Catts Place	II	Mile Oak Road			24 August 1990	TQ6849443986; 51°10′13″N 0°24′32″E		1254293	Upload Photo	Q26545972
Barn Incorporating Oasthouse About 50 Metres North East of Catts Place	II	Mile Oak Road	barn		24 August 1990	TQ6853343998; 51°10′13″N 0°24′34″E		1254294	Barn Incorporating Oasthouse About 50 Metres North East of Catts Place More images	Q26545973
Catts Place	II	Mile Oak Road			24 August 1990	TQ6851743983; 51°10′13″N 0°24′33″E		1254292	Upload Photo	Q26545971
Mile Oak Farmhouse	II	Mile Oak Road			24 August 1990	TQ6805143728; 51°10′05″N 0°24′08″E		1254291	Upload Photo	Q26545970
Oasthouse Immediately West of Mile Oak Farmhouse	II	Mile Oak Road	hop kiln		24 August 1990	TQ6802743750; 51°10′06″N 0°24′07″E		1261379	Oasthouse Immediately West of Mile Oak Farmhouse More images	Q26552335
Stables About 40 Metres North and West of Catts Place	II	Mile Oak Road			24 August 1990	TQ6849144013; 51°10′14″N 0°24′31″E		1254295	Upload Photo	Q26545974
Green Weston	II	Pearson's Green			24 August 1990	TQ6961543414; 51°09′53″N 0°25′28″E		1254297	Upload Photo	Q26545976
Little Old Hay	II	Pearson's Green			27 August 1987	TQ6968044053; 51°10′14″N 0°25′33″E		1254298	Upload Photo	Q26545977
Pearsons Farmhouse	II	Pearson's Green			24 August 1990	TQ6959343302; 51°09′50″N 0°25′27″E		1254296	Upload Photo	Q26545975
Hawthorns Roundabouts	II	Pearsons Green Road			17 July 1990	TQ6905843998; 51°10′13″N 0°25′01″E		1261380	Upload Photo	Q26552336
Knell Farmhouse	II	Queen Street			24 August 1990	TQ6815744312; 51°10′24″N 0°24′15″E		1254299	Upload Photo	Q26545978

== See also ==
- Grade I listed buildings in Kent
- Grade II* listed buildings in Kent

== Sources ==
- Newman, John (2012) [1969], Kent: West and the Weald, The Buildings of England, New Haven and London: Yale University Press, ISBN 978-0-300-18509-6
