= Listed buildings in East Malling and Larkfield =

Civil Parish in Kent, England

East Malling and Larkfield is a village and civil parish in the Tonbridge and Malling district of Kent, England. It contains 74 listed buildings that are recorded in the National Heritage List for England. Of these four are grade I, five are grade II* and 65 are grade II.

This list is based on the information retrieved online from Historic England.

== Key ==
Grade	Criteria
I	Buildings that are of exceptional interest
II*	Particularly important buildings of more than special interest
II	Buildings that are of special interest

== Listing ==
Name	Grade	Location	Type	Completed (Note: The date given is the date used by Historic England as significant for the initial building or that of an important part in the structure's description.)	Date designated	Grid ref. (Note: The grid reference is based on the British national grid reference system, sometimes known as OSGB36, used by the Ordnance Survey.) Geo-coordinates	Notes	Entry number (Note: The "List Entry Number" is a unique number assigned to each listed building and scheduled monument by Historic England.)	Image	Wikidata
Blackland Timber Barn	II	Blacklands			22 January 1992	TQ6962457449; 51°17′27″N 0°25′53″E		1070458	Upload Photo	Q26324358
Blacklands House	II	Blacklands			1 August 1952	TQ6976157604; 51°17′32″N 0°26′00″E		1099183	Upload Photo	Q26391334
Broadwater Farm Oasthouses	II	Broadwater Road	hop kiln		10 February 1993	TQ6885256699; 51°17′04″N 0°25′12″E		1210910	Broadwater Farm Oasthouses More images	Q26505950
Cobb's Hall	II	Broadwater Road			25 February 1987	TQ6909657443; 51°17′28″N 0°25′25″E		1070529	Upload Photo	Q26324492
Broadwater Farmhouse	II	285, Broadwater Road, West Malling, ME19 6HT			10 February 1993	TQ6883856649; 51°17′02″N 0°25′11″E		1210816	Upload Photo	Q26505861
Barn 30 Yards West of Ivy House Farmhouse	II	Chapel Street			1 August 1952	TQ7004656717; 51°17′03″N 0°26′13″E		1349047	Upload Photo	Q26632370
Ivy House Farmhouse	II	Chapel Street			1 August 1952	TQ7007256707; 51°17′03″N 0°26′14″E		1070530	Upload Photo	Q26324494
The Limes	II	Chapel Street			25 February 1987	TQ7010856785; 51°17′05″N 0°26′16″E		1363103	Upload Photo	Q26644949
Wall to North East of the Limes	II	Chapel Street			25 February 1987	TQ7012756795; 51°17′06″N 0°26′17″E		1099190	Upload Photo	Q26391341
122, Chapel Street	II	122, Chapel Street			25 February 1987	TQ7001956390; 51°16′53″N 0°26′11″E		1363104	Upload Photo	Q26644950
Holly Cottage Raven Cottage	II	14, Chapel Street			25 February 1987	TQ7013556841; 51°17′07″N 0°26′18″E		1099186	Upload Photo	Q26391337
Kinross Cottage	II	21, Chapel Street			12 November 1986	TQ7015756842; 51°17′07″N 0°26′19″E		1099144	Upload Photo	Q26391298
Tamarisk Cottage	II	25, Chapel Street			25 February 1987	TQ7014756822; 51°17′06″N 0°26′19″E		1070531	Upload Photo	Q26324496
Andrewes Tomb 10 Yards North of East Malling Church	II	Church Walk			25 February 1987	TQ7028657101; 51°17′15″N 0°26′26″E		1349068	Upload Photo	Q26632390
Andrewes Tomb 4 Yards North East of Malling Church	II	Church Walk			25 February 1987	TQ7028557093; 51°17′15″N 0°26′26″E		1070534	Upload Photo	Q26324502
Andrewes Tomb 6 Yards North of East Malling Church	II	Church Walk			25 February 1987	TQ7028557096; 51°17′15″N 0°26′26″E		1349069	Upload Photo	Q26632391
Andrewes Tomb 8 Yards North of East Malling Church	II	Church Walk			25 February 1987	TQ7028657098; 51°17′15″N 0°26′26″E		1363106	Upload Photo	Q26644952
Church of St James	I	Church Walk	church building		25 August 1959	TQ7029457080; 51°17′15″N 0°26′27″E		1099148	Church of St James More images	Q17530252
Court Lodge	II	Church Walk			1 August 1952	TQ7024257113; 51°17′16″N 0°26′24″E		1070532	Upload Photo	Q26324498
Malting's Restaurant	II	Church Walk			25 February 1987	TQ7018457088; 51°17′15″N 0°26′21″E		1363105	Upload Photo	Q26644951
Thornhill Tomb 15 Yards West North West of East Malling	II	Church Walk			25 February 1987	TQ7026257093; 51°17′15″N 0°26′25″E		1070533	Upload Photo	Q26324500
4 and 6, Church Walk	II*	4 and 6, Church Walk			1 August 1952	TQ7019857089; 51°17′15″N 0°26′22″E		1349080	Upload Photo	Q17547085
Clare House	I	Clare Lane			1 August 1952	TQ6947357736; 51°17′37″N 0°25′45″E		1099100	Upload Photo	Q17530249
Old School Cottages	II	Clare Lane			1 August 1952	TQ6956157446; 51°17′27″N 0°25′49″E		1099129	Upload Photo	Q26391284
Wall and Arch to Stable Court at Clare House	II	Clare Lane			25 February 1987	TQ6947557752; 51°17′37″N 0°25′45″E		1070536	Upload Photo	Q26324505
106, Clare Lane	II	106, Clare Lane			25 February 1987	TQ6931857726; 51°17′37″N 0°25′37″E		1070494	Upload Photo	Q26324432
Lyme Cottage	II	11, Clare Lane, East Malling, ME19 6BN			25 February 1987	TQ6953157480; 51°17′28″N 0°25′48″E		1070535	Upload Photo	Q26324504
East Malling War Memorial	II	Corner Of Church Walk And High Street	war memorial		24 June 2010	TQ7019557107; 51°17′16″N 0°26′22″E		1393853	East Malling War Memorial More images	Q26672991
Barn 30 Yards South West of Great Lunsford Farmhouse	II	East Malling & Larkfield			25 February 1987	TQ6980059956; 51°18′48″N 0°26′06″E		1349058	Upload Photo	Q26632381
Great Lunsford Farmhouse	II	East Malling & Larkfield			25 February 1987	TQ6978759983; 51°18′49″N 0°26′05″E		1363102	Upload Photo	Q26644948
Little Lunsford Farmhouse	II	East Malling & Larkfield			25 February 1987	TQ6968159897; 51°18′46″N 0°26′00″E		1070528	Upload Photo	Q26324490
The Forge House	II	High Street			25 February 1987	TQ7015256979; 51°17′12″N 0°26′19″E		1070498	Upload Photo	Q26324440
The Vicarage	II	High Street			1 August 1952	TQ7017457028; 51°17′13″N 0°26′20″E		1363123	Upload Photo	Q26644967
10-16, High Street	II	10-16, High Street			25 February 1987	TQ7015757052; 51°17′14″N 0°26′19″E		1070496	Upload Photo	Q26324437
24 and 26, High Street	II	24 and 26, High Street			1 July 1980	TQ7014757017; 51°17′13″N 0°26′19″E		1070497	Upload Photo	Q26324438
45, High Street	II	45, High Street			25 February 1987	TQ7018656956; 51°17′11″N 0°26′21″E		1070499	Upload Photo	Q26324442
Milepost at Ngr Tq6998558314	II	London, Larkfield			6 July 2009	TQ6998758314; 51°17′55″N 0°26′13″E		1393350	Upload Photo	Q26672520
The Inn House	II	London Road			25 February 1987	TQ7031958306; 51°17′54″N 0°26′30″E		1363124	Upload Photo	Q26644968
The Wealden Hall Restaurant	II*	London Road	architectural structure		25 February 1987	TQ7035158303; 51°17′54″N 0°26′32″E		1070501	The Wealden Hall Restaurant More images	Q17546782
781-189, London Road	II	781-189, London Road			17 December 1985	TQ7030358306; 51°17′54″N 0°26′29″E		1070500	Upload Photo	Q26324444
Elizabeth Smith Almshouses	II	Mill Street			9 June 1978	TQ6959657231; 51°17′20″N 0°25′51″E		1363126	Upload Photo	Q26644970
Horse Pond 20 Yards North West of Weir Mill	II	Mill Street			23 September 1974	TQ6969657232; 51°17′20″N 0°25′56″E		1348479	Upload Photo	Q26631856
Office Building at Invicta Works	II	Mill Street			25 February 1987	TQ6954357284; 51°17′22″N 0°25′48″E		1099909	Upload Photo	Q26392017
The Laurels	II	Mill Street			25 February 1987	TQ6974657193; 51°17′19″N 0°25′58″E		1070503	Upload Photo	Q26324449
Weir Mill	II	Mill Street			15 November 1973	TQ6969857201; 51°17′19″N 0°25′56″E		1348690	Upload Photo	Q26632053
Westbrook House	II	Mill Street			25 February 1987	TQ6953457327; 51°17′23″N 0°25′48″E		1070504	Upload Photo	Q26324451
Ingleside	II	1, Mill Street, East Malling, ME19 6DA			25 February 1987	TQ7016457081; 51°17′15″N 0°26′20″E		1070495	Upload Photo	Q26324434
11, Mill Street	II	11, Mill Street			1 August 1952	TQ7012857097; 51°17′15″N 0°26′18″E		1070502	Upload Photo	Q26324447
120-126, Mill Street	II	120-126, Mill Street			25 February 1987	TQ6962657251; 51°17′21″N 0°25′52″E		1070505	Upload Photo	Q26324453
148-152, Mill Street	II	148-152, Mill Street			25 February 1987	TQ6956057308; 51°17′23″N 0°25′49″E		1348476	Upload Photo	Q26631853
3 and 5 Mill Street	II	3 and 5, Mill Street, East Malling, ME19 6DA			22 April 1986	TQ7015957087; 51°17′15″N 0°26′20″E		1099918	Upload Photo	Q26392027
69-75, Mill Street	II	69-75, Mill Street			1 August 1952	TQ6982857146; 51°17′17″N 0°26′03″E		1348728	Upload Photo	Q26632088
90, Mill Street	II	90, Mill Street			23 September 1974	TQ6979657203; 51°17′19″N 0°26′01″E		1363127	Upload Photo	Q26644971
93 and 95, Mill Street	II	93 and 95, Mill Street			25 February 1987	TQ6976257182; 51°17′18″N 0°25′59″E		1363125	Upload Photo	Q26644969
Church of the Holy Trinity	II	New Hythe Lane	church building		25 February 1987	TQ7046059182; 51°18′22″N 0°26′39″E		1070506	Church of the Holy Trinity More images	Q26324455
The Monk's Head Public House and Nos 46-50 (even)	II	46-50, New Hythe Lane			10 December 1974	TQ7034958486; 51°18′00″N 0°26′32″E		1348496	Upload Photo	Q26631872
Bradbourne House	I	New Road, East Malling, ME19 6DZ	English country house		1 August 1952	TQ7036257909; 51°17′41″N 0°26′31″E		1070507	Bradbourne House More images	Q4954402
Stable Block and Barns 40 Yards North of Bradbourne House	I	New Road			1 August 1952	TQ7034157965; 51°17′43″N 0°26′31″E		1348523	Upload Photo	Q17530311
The King and Queen Public House	II	New Road	pub		1 August 1952	TQ7016757114; 51°17′16″N 0°26′20″E		1100314	The King and Queen Public House More images	Q26392422
108, New Road	II	108, New Road			25 February 1987	TQ7005757698; 51°17′35″N 0°26′15″E		1363128	Upload Photo	Q26644972
Heath Cottage	II	90, The Heath			25 February 1987	TQ6961456045; 51°16′42″N 0°25′50″E		1363130	Upload Photo	Q26644973
Barn 80 Yards to the East of Paris Farmhouse	II	The Rocks Road			25 February 1987	TQ7051856659; 51°17′01″N 0°26′37″E		1100295	Upload Photo	Q26392392
Dovecot 30 Yards North East of Paris Farmhouse	II	The Rocks Road			25 February 1987	TQ7049556695; 51°17′02″N 0°26′36″E		1100292	Upload Photo	Q26392386
Paris Farmhouse	II*	The Rocks Road			1 August 1952	TQ7046256689; 51°17′02″N 0°26′35″E		1363129	Upload Photo	Q17547110
Rock Farmhouse	II	The Rocks Road			1 August 1952	TQ7040656633; 51°17′00″N 0°26′32″E		1100285	Upload Photo	Q26392378
132, the Rocks Road	II	132, The Rocks Road			17 June 1977	TQ7047256650; 51°17′01″N 0°26′35″E		1070509	Upload Photo	Q26324459
6, the Rocks Road	II	6, The Rocks Road			25 February 1987	TQ7018156878; 51°17′08″N 0°26′20″E		1070508	Upload Photo	Q26324457
Derbies	II*	Well Street			12 November 1986	TQ6943256530; 51°16′58″N 0°25′41″E		1363131	Upload Photo	Q17547116
Spring Head Farmhouse	II	Well Street			25 February 1987	TQ6938556420; 51°16′54″N 0°25′39″E		1070511	Upload Photo	Q26324463
Spring Hill Lodge	II	Well Street			25 February 1987	TQ6946856592; 51°17′00″N 0°25′43″E		1348514	Upload Photo	Q26631890
The Barracks	II*	Well Street	architectural structure		1 August 1952	TQ6939556552; 51°16′59″N 0°25′39″E		1070512	The Barracks More images	Q17546786
185, Well Street	II	185, Well Street			6 October 1976	TQ6948356720; 51°17′04″N 0°25′44″E		1348513	Upload Photo	Q26631889
205, Well Street	II	205, Well Street			25 February 1987	TQ6949856634; 51°17′01″N 0°25′45″E		1070510	Upload Photo	Q26324461
257-259, Well Street	II	257-259, Well Street			25 February 1987	TQ6940256452; 51°16′55″N 0°25′39″E		1348515	Upload Photo	Q26631891

== See also ==
- Grade I listed buildings in Kent
- Grade II* listed buildings in Kent

== Sources ==
- Newman, John (2012) [1969], Kent: West and the Weald, The Buildings of England, New Haven and London: Yale University Press, ISBN 978-0-300-18509-6
