= Branbridges =

Coordinates: 51.209737°N 0.396229°E

- Location within Kent
- OS grid reference: TQ6748
- Shire county: Kent
- Region: South East
- Country: England
- Sovereign state: United Kingdom
- Post town: TONBRIDGE
- Postcode district: TN12
- Police: Kent
- Fire: Kent
- Ambulance: South East Coast
- UK Parliament: Tonbridge

Branbridges is a village in Kent, England, on the River Medway. It is near East Peckham, and the nearest railway station is Beltring.

There is one Grade II Listed building: Banbridges House on the north side of the Medway.

Today it has practically merged with the neighbouring village of East Peckham. It contains a petrol station and an industrial estate called Branbridges Estate to the south of the village.
