= Larkfield Priory Hotel =

English hotel, restaurant, and bar

- Interactive map of the Larkfield Priory Hotel area

General information
- Coordinates: 51°17′57″N 0°26′17″E

Other information
- Number of rooms: 52
- Parking: 100+

Website
- www.larkfieldpriory.co.uk

Larkfield Priory Hotel was a hotel, restaurant, bar and function venue in Larkfield, Kent. It benefited from being on the A20 London Road and is just 4 miles north west of the county town of Maidstone.

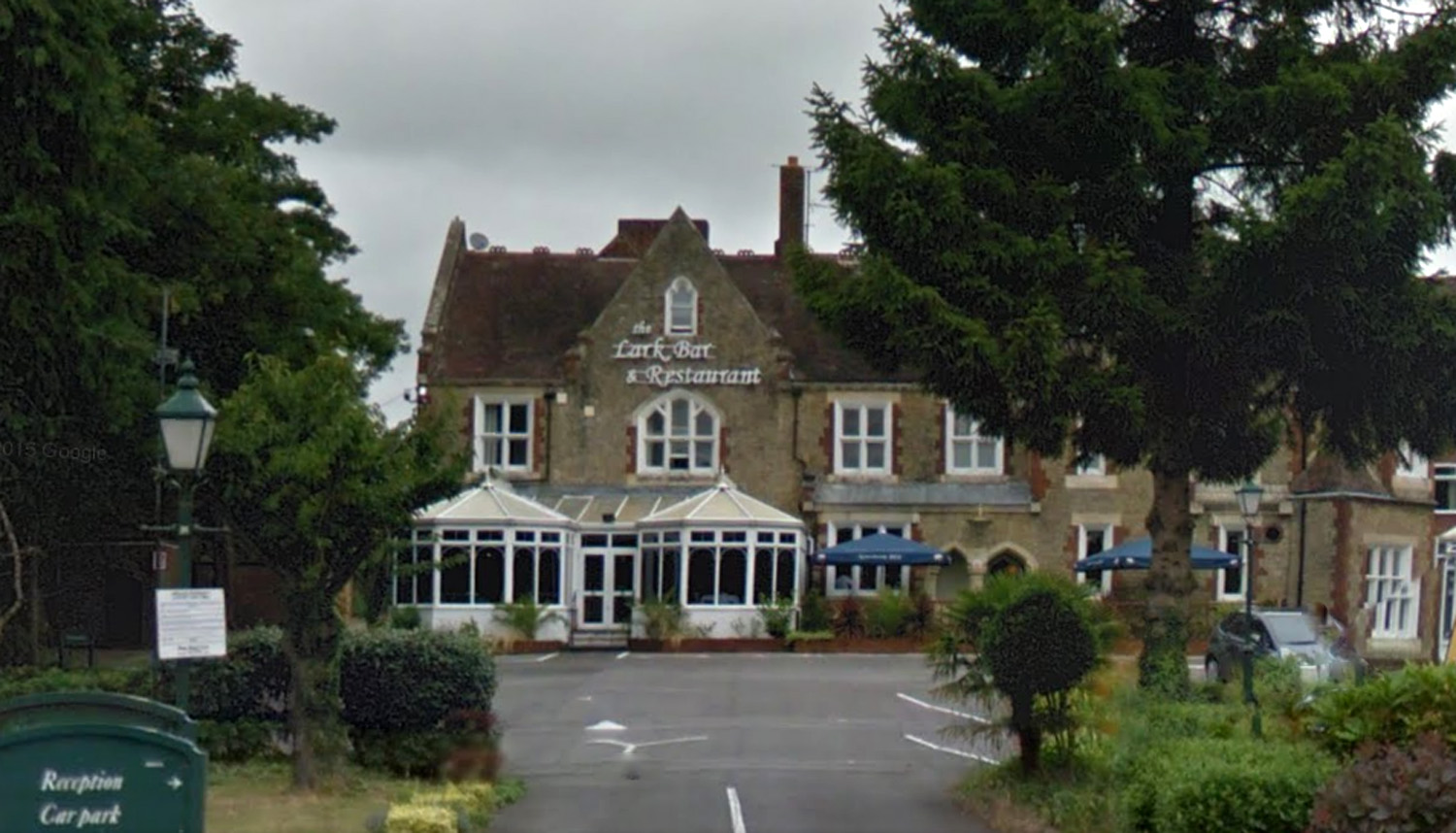
Larkfield Priory Hotel

== History ==
A manor house was located on the site from the 18th century on what was known as Larkfield farm. In the nineteenth century it was the home of the Reverend William Lewis Wigan and his family. Wigan died in 1876 and the family continued to live at the residence. In 1892, a fire damaged the building and it had to be restored. It was eventually extended and became a hotel. The hotel now has 52 rooms and was renovated in the early 2000s.

The hotel has been closed since 2021 following damage caused by a disgruntled staff member who went on the rampage causing £94,000 worth of damage

== Business History ==
As a hotel, the Larkfield Priory Hotel has held itself as landmark within the local community. Previous corporate powers from Forte Hotel, Corus and Swallows have all befitted from the hotel's great location, picturesque grounds and wonderful facilities. It was briefly known as Hamlets Hotel, which as business was run into administration. It was renamed to Larkfield Priory Hotel in January 2013 and stabilised as a business. The premises came under new management in March 2020, shortly before Covid-19 national lockdown. The hotel is currently undergoing updating and modernisation whilst remaining open.
