= Maidstone Barracks railway station =

Railway station in Kent, England

Coordinates: 51°16′38.30″N 0°30′50.72″E

Maidstone Barracks
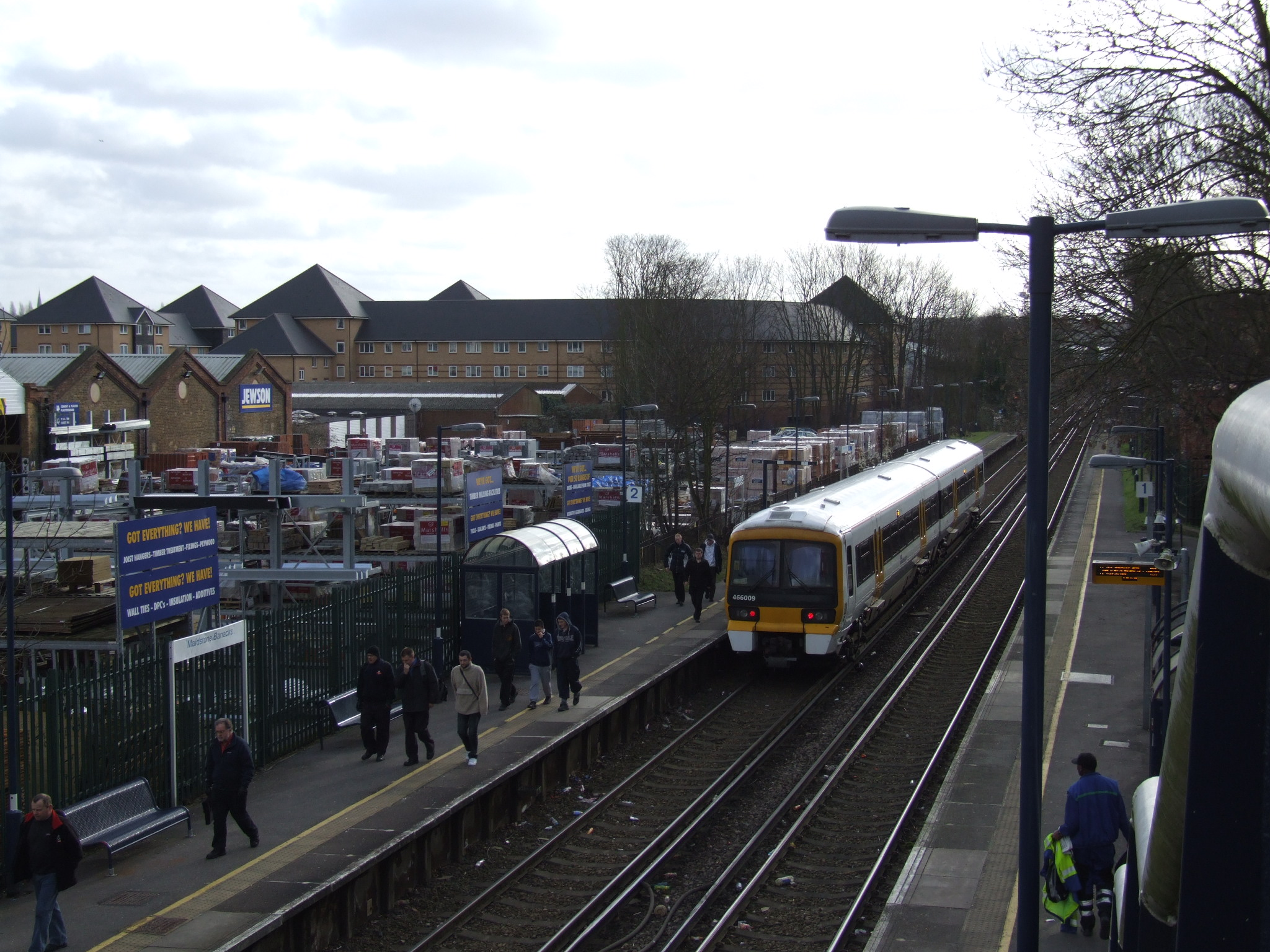
- A Class 466 Networker on platform 2 in 2008

General information
- Location: Maidstone, Maidstone; England
- Grid reference: TQ754561
- Manager: Southeastern
- Platforms: 2

Other information
- Station code: MDB
- Classification: DfT category F1

History
- Opened: 1 July 1874

Passengers
- 2021/22: ▲0.176 million
- Interchange: ▲0.150 million
- 2022/23: ▲0.206 million
- Interchange: ▼0.136 million
- 2023/24: ▲0.256 million
- Interchange: ▲0.191 million
- 2024/25: ▲0.275 million
- Interchange: ▼4,295
- 2025/26: ▲0.283 million
- Interchange: ▲6,555
Location
Notes
- Passenger statistics from the Office of Rail and Road

Maidstone Barracks railway station is one of three railway stations which serve the town of Maidstone in Kent, England. Originally opened as Barracks station, it is named after the nearby Invicta Park Barracks and lies on the Medway Valley Line, 42 miles (68 km) from London Charing Cross via Strood between Aylesford and Maidstone West. The station and all trains serving it are operated by Southeastern.

The station has been unstaffed since September 1989 and the booking office on the Strood-bound platform was subsequently demolished. A PERTIS (permit to travel) passenger-operated self-service ticket machine was installed on the Strood-bound platform in 2007–08.

== Services ==
All services at Maidstone Barracks are operated by Southeastern using Class 375 EMUs.

The typical off-peak service in trains per hour is:

- 2 tph to Strood
- 2 tph to Paddock Wood via Maidstone West

A small number of morning, mid afternoon and late evening trains continue beyond Paddock Wood to Tonbridge.

On Sundays, the service is reduced to hourly in each direction.

Preceding station	National Rail	Following station
Aylesford	Southeastern Medway Valley Line	Maidstone West

== See also ==
- Maidstone East railway station
- Maidstone West railway station
