= East Farleigh Bridge =

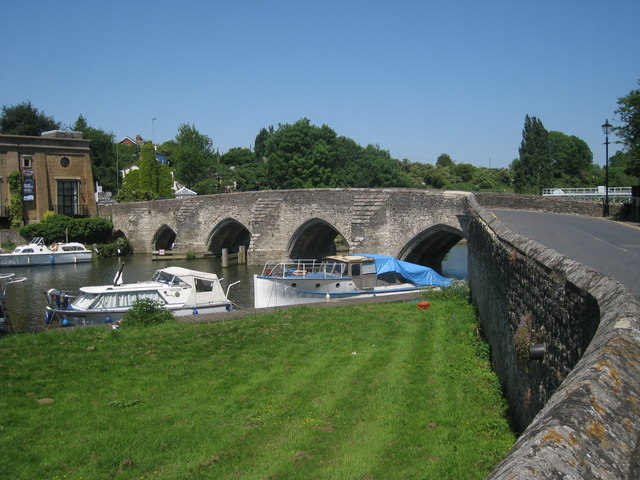
- East Farleigh Bridge
- Coordinates: 51.254616°N 0.484667°E
- Crosses: River Medway
- Locale: East Farleigh
- Owner: Kent County Council
- Maintained by: Kent County Council
- Heritage status: Grade I listed, also a scheduled ancient monument
- Preceded by: Barming Bridge
- Followed by: Tovil Bridge

Characteristics
- Material: Ragstone
- No. of spans: Five
- Piers in water: Three

History
- Construction end: 14th century

East Farleigh Bridge is a road bridge across the River Medway in East Farleigh, Kent, England.

The bridge is medieval and was probably constructed in the 14th century. It comprises four arches, spanning the river and a smaller, later arch spanning the north bank. A long retaining wall carrying the road over the low-lying meadow to the south of the river has a blind arch on one side. The bridge is a Grade I listed building and a scheduled ancient monument.

It is built of coursed rag-stone with ashlar capping stones to the parapets. The bridge is narrow, only wide enough to permit traffic to pass in one direction at a time. The bridge features substantial cutwaters on each side. It has been described as "probably the finest medieval bridge in the south of England".

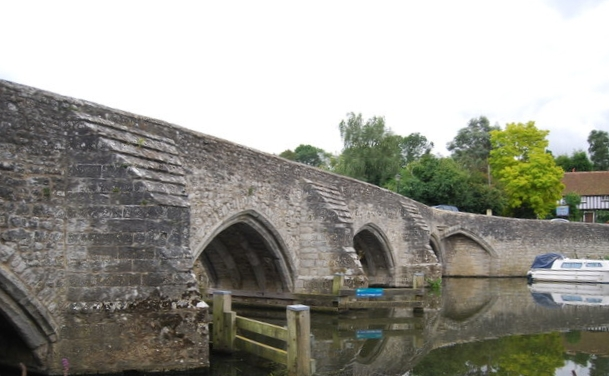
The west side of the bridge looking south showing the cutwaters and the blind arch

== See also ==
- Grade I listed buildings in Maidstone
- List of scheduled monuments in Maidstone
