= East Malling and Larkfield =

Civil parish in Kent, England

Coordinates: 51.290°N 0.471°E

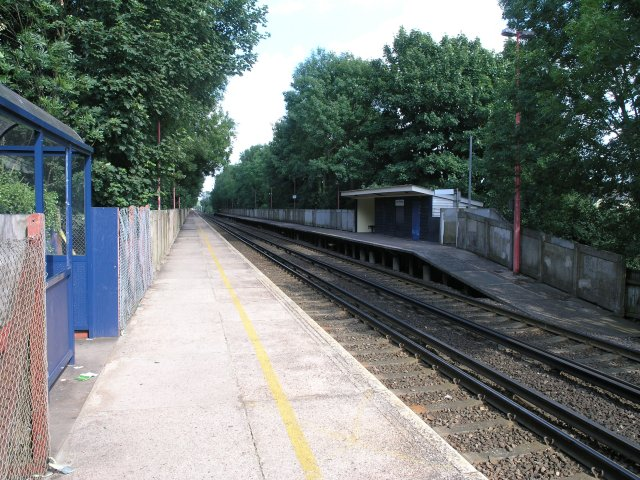
- East Malling station

- Location within Kent
- Population: 14,185 (2011 census)
- Civil parish: East Malling and Larkfield
- District: Tonbridge and Malling
- Shire county: Kent
- Region: South East
- Country: England
- Sovereign state: United Kingdom
- Post town: West Malling
- Postcode district: ME19
- Post town: Aylesford
- Postcode district: ME20
- Dialling code: 01732, 01622
- Police: Kent
- Fire: Kent
- Ambulance: South East Coast
- UK Parliament: Maidstone and Malling Chatham and Aylesford

East Malling is a civil parish in the Tonbridge and Malling district, in Kent, England which includes the villages of East Malling and Larkfield. In 2011 it had a population of 14,185.

== History ==
The parish was renamed from "East Malling" on 19 April 1962.

== See also ==
- Listed buildings in East Malling and Larkfield
