= Medway Valley line =

Railway line in Kent

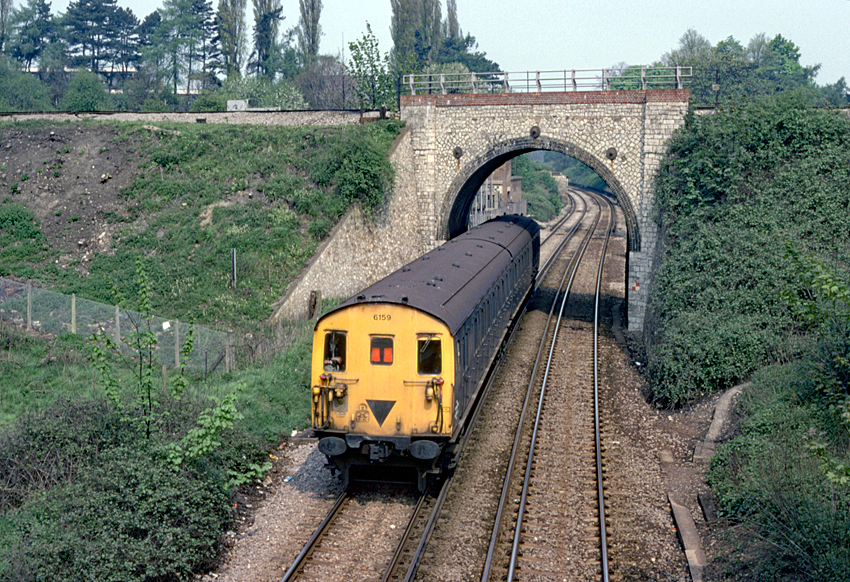
- The line being crossed by the Maidstone East line near Maidstone Barracks. There is no direct rail connection between the two lines.

Overview
- Status: Operational
- Owner: Network Rail
- Locale: Kent; South East England
- Termini: Strood; Paddock Wood
- Stations: 13

Service
- Type: Suburban rail, Heavy rail
- System: National Rail
- Route number: 01
- Operator: Southeastern
- Rolling stock: Class 375 "Electrostar"; Class 395 "Javelin"

History
- Opened: 1856

Technical
- Line length: 21 miles 19 chains (34.18 km)
- Number of tracks: 2
- Track gauge: 1,435 mm (4 ft 8 1/2 in) standard gauge
- Electrification: Third rail, 750 V DC
- Operating speed: 70 mph (110 km/h)
Route map
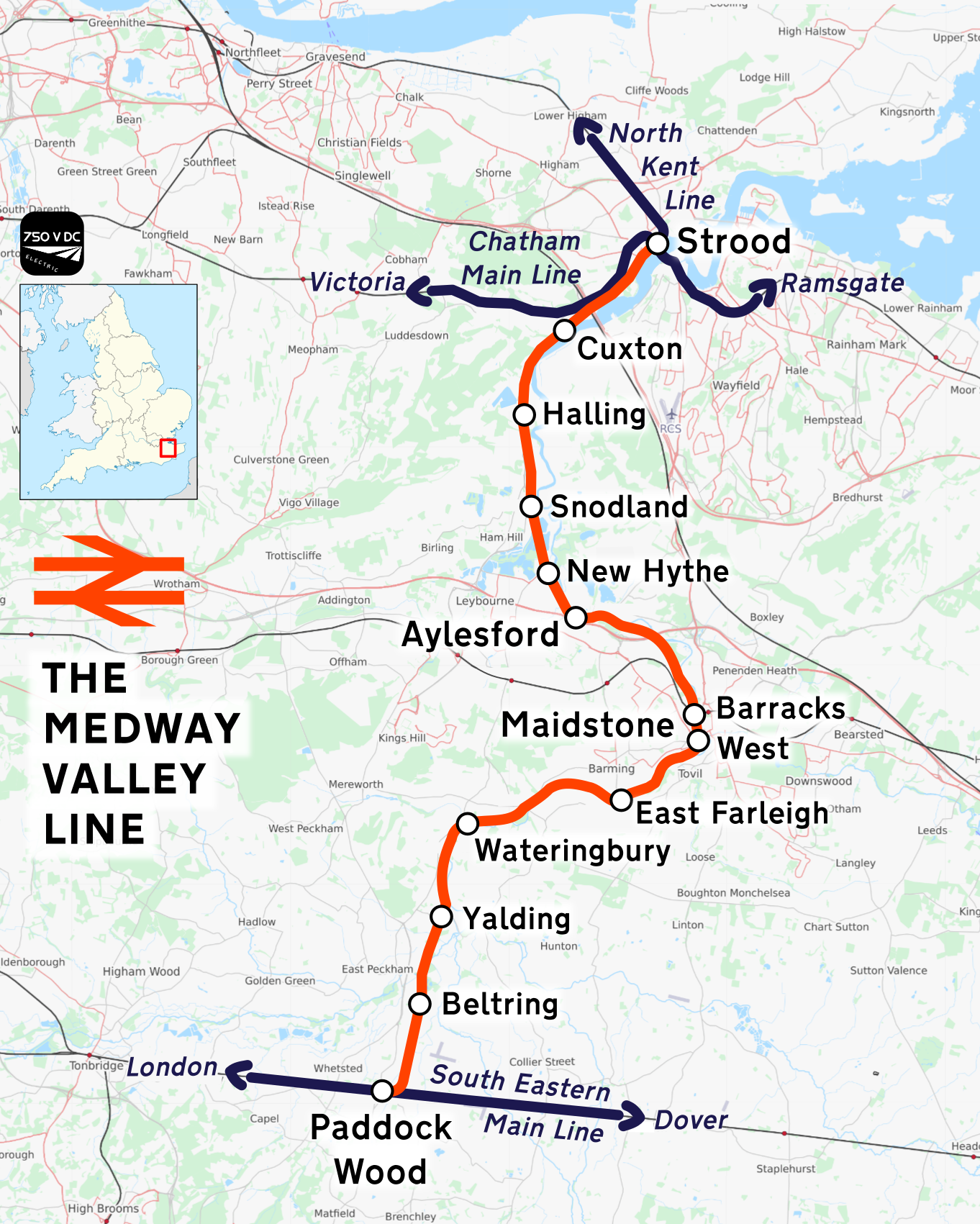
(Click to expand)

The Medway Valley line is the name given to the railway line linking Strood in the Medway Towns via Maidstone West to Tonbridge. High Speed services also link between Maidstone West, Snodland, Strood and London St Pancras International (peak only). The section from Maidstone West to Paddock Wood passes through some of Kent's most picturesque countryside along the narrower sections of the River Medway.

== History ==
The line was built in two stages by the South Eastern Railway (SER). The first stage opened on 24 September 1844 and was a branch off the SER's first main line that crossed Kent between the coast ports of Dover and Folkestone and the LBSCR's main line at Redhill. According to a contemporary report in The Times newspaper, the opening of the branch line was an attempt to convey hops and fruit traffic back to Maidstone, which was losing trade to various points along the Dover line. The junction was at Paddock Wood and followed the Medway Valley down to the county town of Maidstone that had been by-passed by the new main line.

South-eastern Railway (Strood to Maidstone) Act 1853
- Act of Parliament
- Parliament of the United Kingdom
- Long title: An Act to enable the South-eastern Railway Company to make a Railway from Strood to Maidstone; and for other Purposes.
- Citation: 16 & 17 Vict. c. cxxx

Dates
- Royal assent: 4 August 1853

Text of statute as originally enacted

Twelve years later, on 18 June 1856 the extension of the line further down the Medway Valley was opened, to join the North Kent Line at Strood (which had opened in 1847). The extension had been authorised by the South-eastern Railway (Strood to Maidstone) Act 1853 (16 & 17 Vict. c. cxxx) and was built by the railway contractor Edward Betts, who lived locally at Preston Hall and through whose estate the line partially passed. Betts arranged for his local station at Aylesford to be built in a much grander style than the other country stations along the line.

That it shall be lawful for the South-eastern Railway Company to make and maintain a Railway, with all proper Works and Conveniences connected therewith, commencing at or near the East End of the Tunnel near the Strood Station of the North Kent Railway in the Parish of Frindsbury in the County of Kent, and terminating by a Junction with the Maidstone Branch of the South-eastern Railway at the Maidstone Station of that Railway in the Parish of Maidstone in the same County. — Section 2, South-eastern Railway (Strood to Maidstone) Act 1853 (16 & 17 Vict. c. cxxx)

The SER started joint working with local rival London, Chatham and Dover Railway (LCDR) on 1 January 1899 under the name the South Eastern and Chatham Railway (SECR). Post World War One, the railways were "grouped" and the SECR became part of Southern Railway.

For a brief period in the 1990s some services were extended to Gillingham (Kent) via Rochester and Chatham. This involved reversing trains and switching tracks at Strood.

It was designated by the Department for Transport as a community rail service in September 2007.

=== Industry ===
The line served many rail connected industries, Aveling and Porter just south of Strood, cement works in the Cuxton, Halling and Snodland areas, a newsprint at New Hythe, Lafarge between Aylesford and Maidstone Barracks, Lockmeadow sidings at Maidstone West, Tovil goods depot and sand pits at Beltring

== Infrastructure ==
=== Track ===
The line is double track throughout, apart from a short single-track section on approach to Paddock Wood station, with a maximum speed of 70 miles per hour (110 km/h). Between Paddock Wood and Tonbridge the maximum speed is 100 miles per hour (160 km/h).

=== Stations ===
The line serves the following stations: Strood, Cuxton, Halling, Snodland, New Hythe, Aylesford, Maidstone Barracks, Maidstone West, East Farleigh, Wateringbury, Yalding, Beltring, Paddock Wood and Tonbridge

=== Signalling ===
During 2005, the signalling systems were upgraded, replacing the traditional semaphore signals with coloured light signals. Further modifications have since been made with the expansion of the North Kent Signalling Centre. The level crossing at Yalding has the only signal on the Southeastern network to display a flashing white light as the proceed aspect.

=== Electrification ===
The line from Strood to Maidstone West was electrified (at 750 V DC third rail) by the Southern Railway, opening on 2 July 1939. The rest of the line from Paddock Wood to Maidstone West was electrified under Stage 2 of Kent Coast electrification by BR's 1955 Modernisation Plan, opening to traffic on 18 June 1962.

== Train services ==
Services are operated by Southeastern.

Trains typically run at off-peak half-hourly (hourly on Sundays) service between Strood and Paddock Wood with some peak services being extended to Tonbridge. There is also a special service at 22:34 every night from Tonbridge to Gillingham (Kent).

=== High-speed introduction ===
On 18 March 2011, Southeastern announced the start of a new high-speed service from Maidstone to St Pancras International via Strood on a trial basis. During the morning rush hour, there are 2 trains from Maidstone West to St Pancras International, and 1 train heading in the opposite direction. In the evening rush hour, the services are reversed (2 trains to Maidstone West, and 1 train to St Pancras International). Services in the opposite direction to the main flow do not call at Snodland and instead run non-stop from Maidstone West to Strood.

A trial service commenced on 23 May 2011 and comes as a result of changes on the North Kent line to improve punctuality of existing services. This service has since been made permanent and is still extant in 2026, although the single service each way in the non-peak flow direction was later abolished.

== Traction and rolling stock ==
The main rolling stock used on the line is 3 car Class 375/3 Electrostars.

Class 395 Javelins serve the line during Monday to Friday peak hours with high speed services from St. Pancras International to Maidstone West, with Snodland the only intermediate station it serves on the line.

Class	Image	Type	Cars per set	Top speed		Number	Operator	Notes	Built
Class	Image	Type	Cars per set	mph	km/h	Number	Operator	Notes	Built
Class 375			3 or 4	100	160	140		All services on the Medway Valley line are usually operated by 375/3s but 375/6/7/8/9s may occasionally appear.	1999–2005
Class 395 Javelin		EMU	6	140 (HS1) 100 (Mainline)	225 (HS1) 160 (Mainline)	29	Southeastern	Peak time high speed services between Maidstone West and St.Pancras International	2007–2009

=== Freight/Other ===
A variety of freight and other services frequent the line, including through traffic from Hoo Junction and Tonbridge yard.

Aggregates traffic also features, with destinations including Allington and Aylesford aggregates sidings.

Class	Image	Type
Class 59		Diesel Electric
Class 66		Diesel Electric
Class 73		Electro-Diesel
MPV		
