= Maidstone West railway station =

Railway station in Kent, England

Coordinates: 51°16′14.50″N 0°30′56.50″E

Maidstone West
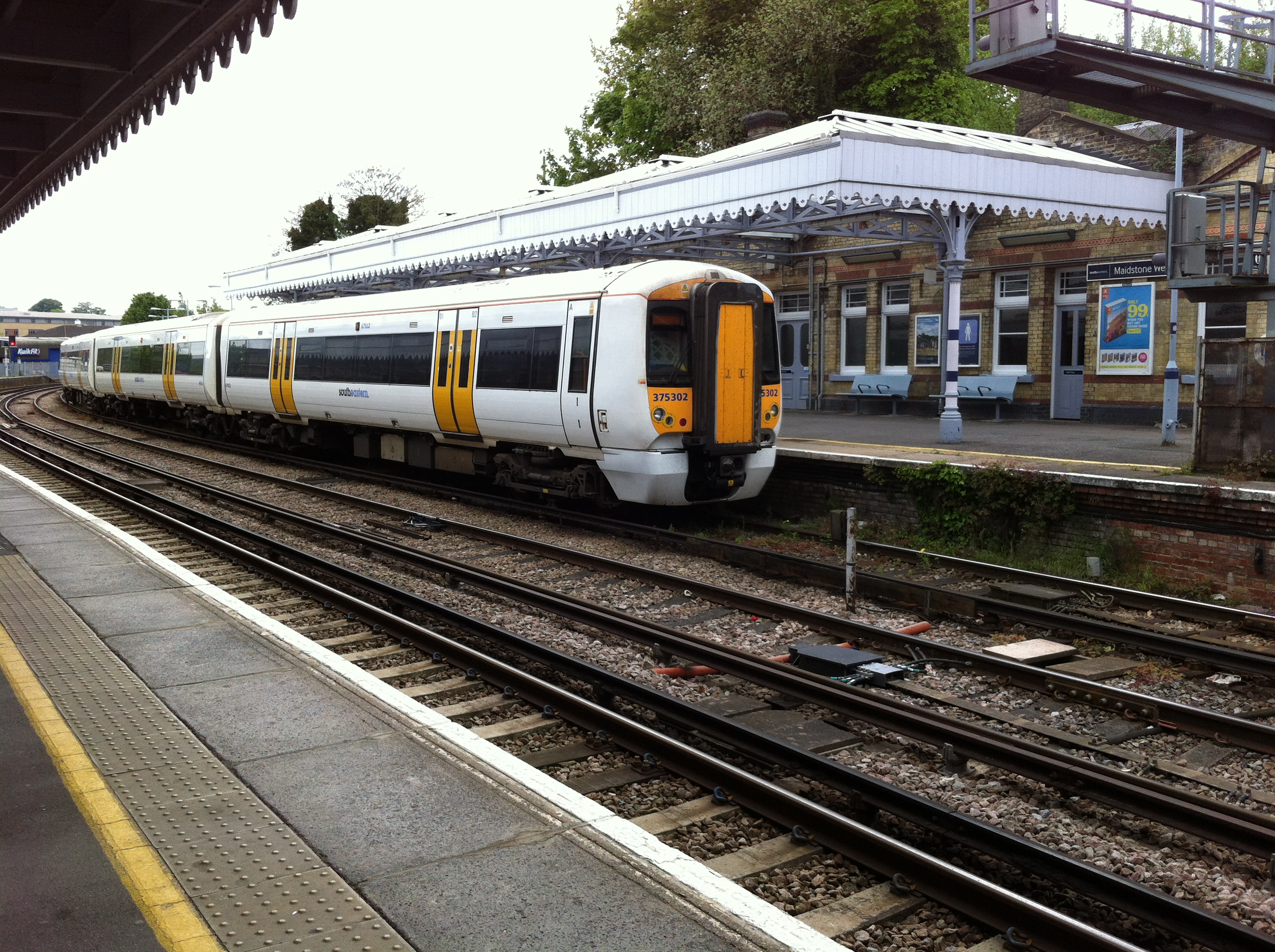

General information
- Location: Maidstone, Maidstone; England
- Grid reference: TQ755553
- Manager: Southeastern
- Platforms: 2

Other information
- Station code: MDW
- Classification: DfT category E

Key dates
- 25 September 1844: Opened (Terminus)
- 18 June 1856: Through station opened

Passengers
- 2021/22: ▲0.549 million
- Interchange: ▲73,597
- 2022/23: ▲0.642 million
- Interchange: ▲0.133 million
- 2023/24: ▲0.797 million
- Interchange: ▲0.173 million
- 2024/25: ▼0.561 million
- Interchange: ▼71,567
- 2025/26: ▲0.577 million
- Interchange: ▼65,963
Location
Notes
- Passenger statistics from the Office of Rail and Road

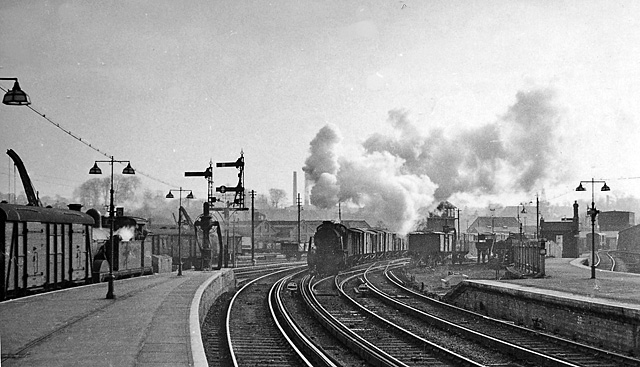
Maidstone West railway station in 1958

Maidstone West railway station is one of three railway stations which serve the town of Maidstone, in Kent, England. It is on the Medway Valley Line, 42 miles 36 chains (68.3 km) from London Charing Cross via Strood and situated between Maidstone Barracks and East Farleigh. The station and all trains serving it are operated by Southeastern.

== History ==
Due largely to opposition from the town's merchants, and the fear expressed by the then Mayor that "Maidstone will be ruined as a commercial town", the town was bypassed when the South Eastern Main Line opened by the South Eastern Railway (SER) in 1842. The line ran approximately eight miles to the south, with the nearest station being at Maidstone Road (later renamed Paddock Wood). On 25 September 1844, a branch line was opened from Paddock Wood to Maidstone West. This was extended further up the Medway Valley to the North Kent Line at Strood on 18 June 1856. The main station building is believed to date from this time.

Maidstone West has a signal box — located at the southern end of the station — which is used as the point at which the mileage measurements and the "Up" and "Down" directions to London change. South of the signal box, the distance from London is measured via Paddock Wood, and the Up (towards London) direction is southbound. From the signal box northwards, however, mileages are measured via Strood and the northbound line is the Up direction. On 3 August 1944, the signal box was severely damaged when a doodlebug landed nearby. Seven people were killed, as well as two dray horses belonging to Maidstone brewers Fremlins. The signalbox was repaired and returned to service.

Just south of Maidstone West was a station at Tovil (TQ 752 549). Passenger services ceased on 15 March 1943. A short line ran on a bridge across the River Medway to a goods station at Tovil Goods (TQ 754 545) until 3 October 1977, from which point the branch line closed completely.

== Services ==
All services at Maidstone West are operated by Southeastern using Class 375 and 395 EMUs.

The typical off-peak service in trains per hour is:

- 2 tph to Strood
- 2 tph to Paddock Wood

A small number of morning, mid afternoon and late evening trains continue beyond Paddock Wood to Tonbridge.

The station is also served by two peak hour high speed services per day to and from London St Pancras International.

On Sundays, the service is reduced to hourly in each direction.

Preceding station	National Rail	Following station
Maidstone Barracks	Southeastern Medway Valley Line	East Farleigh
Snodland	Southeastern High Speed 1 Peak Hours Only	Terminus
	Disused railways	
Terminus	Headcorn & Maidstone; Junction Light Railway	Tovil Goods
