= Paddock Wood railway station =

Railway station in Paddock Wood, Kent

Paddock Wood
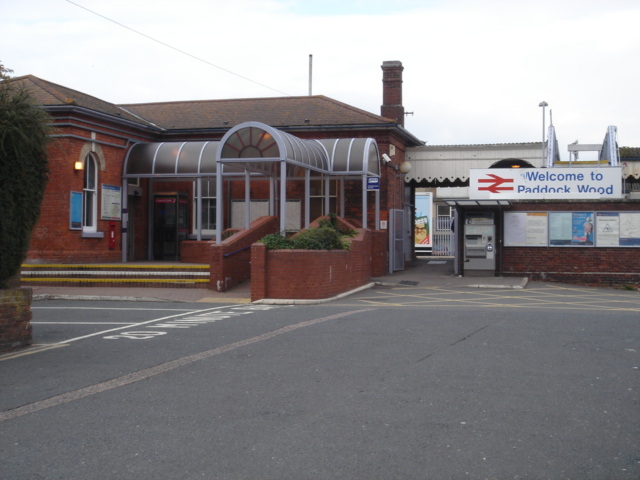

General information
- Location: Paddock Wood, Borough of Tunbridge Wells; England
- Coordinates: 51.1822°N 0.3890°E
- Grid reference: TQ670452
- Manager: Southeastern
- Platforms: 3

Other information
- Station code: PDW
- Classification: DfT category C2

History
- Opened: 31 August 1842

Passengers
- 2020/21: ▼0.269 million
- Interchange: ▼23,435
- 2021/22: ▲0.742 million
- Interchange: ▲67,632
- 2022/23: ▲0.881 million
- Interchange: ▲0.110 million
- 2023/24: ▲0.991 million
- Interchange: ▲0.130 million
- 2024/25: ▲1.090 million
- Interchange: ▲0.170 million
Location
Notes
- Passenger statistics from the Office of Rail and Road

Paddock Wood railway station is on the South Eastern Main Line and Medway Valley Line in south-east England, serving the Borough of Tunbridge Wells town of Paddock Wood. The station also serves the villages of Matfield, Brenchley and Horsmonden, which do not have stations of their own. It is 34 miles 67 chains (56.1 km) down the line from London Charing Cross. The station and all trains calling there are operated by Southeastern.

== History ==
The South Eastern Railway opened a line from Redhill to Ashford and on to Dover during 1842. This bypassed the county town of Maidstone, and a station named Maidstone Road was opened in a rural location on 31 August 1842 to serve the town, 8 miles (13 km) to the north. The village of Paddock Wood developed quickly around the station, which took the name Paddock Wood on 25 September 1844 when the branch line to Maidstone West was opened. Another branch line—the Hawkhurst Branch—to the village of Hawkhurst existed between 1892 and 1961.

== In popular culture ==
Paddock Wood Railway station appears in the novel Dombey and Son by Charles Dickens where, in chapter 55, the villain, Mr Carker, accidentally falls under a train at the station and is killed.

== Platforms ==
The station has Up and Down platforms (1 and 2 respectively) with a pair of fast lines between them. On the Down side, a bay platform (platform 3) is used for the Medway Valley Line services to Maidstone and beyond. A matching bay platform existed on the Up side when the Hawkhurst branch was in operation. The main station building is on the Up platform; there are long canopies on both platforms. Transfer between platforms is by footbridge.

== Services ==
All services at Paddock Wood are operated by Southeastern using Class 375 EMUs.

The typical off-peak service in trains per hour is:

- 2 tph to London Charing Cross
- 1 tph to Dover Priory
- 1 tph to Ramsgate via Canterbury West
- 2 tph to Strood via Maidstone West

Additional services, including trains to and from London Cannon Street and Ramsgate via Deal call at the station during the peak hours.

On Sundays, the service to and from Strood is reduced to hourly.

Preceding station	National Rail	Following station
Tonbridge	Southeastern South Eastern Main Line	Marden
Terminus	Southeastern Medway Valley Line	Beltring
Tonbridge Limited Service	Southeastern Medway Valley Line	Beltring
	Disused railways	
Terminus	British Rail Southern Region Hawkhurst Branch Line	Horsmonden

== Accidents ==
- At 03:40 hrs on 5 May 1919, a goods train from Bricklayers Arms to Margate overran signals and ran into the back of another goods train just to the west of Paddock Wood station. The Margate train was hauled by C class No. 721. It had 50 goods vehicles including three brake vans. The other train was hauled by C class No. 61. The fireman of this train was killed in the accident. Although the main cause of the accident was the driver of the Margate train failing to obey signals, the signalman at Tonbridge East signal box was also censured for failure to give the driver adequate warning that although the train had been accepted by the signalman at Paddock Wood, the line was not fully clear at the junction. The signalman at Paddock Wood had accepted the train under Regulation No 5 - "Section clear but station or junction blocked".
- On 16 March 1949, "Schools" Class locomotive 30932 Blundells was derailed at the station.
- At 02:02 on 8 December 1961, a goods train was setting back at Paddock Wood station when the 00:20 goods from Hoo Junction to Tonbridge, hauled by D6506, overran signals and collided with it. The wreckage from the accident piled up under the bridge carrying the B2160 Maidstone Road. The line was blocked for 12 hours.
