= Timothy Duke (cricketer) =

English cricketer

Personal information
- Born: 29 October 1799; Penshurst, Kent
- Died: 25 May 1858 (aged 58); East Grinstead, Sussex
- Relatives: John Duke

Domestic team information
- Years: Team
- 1823–1828: Kent

Timothy Duke (29 October 1799 – 25 May 1858) was an English businessman and cricketer who was a member of the family which established Dukes, the manufacturer of cricket balls. He played five matches for Kent between 1823 and 1828.

Duke was born at Penshurst in Kent in 1799, the son of Timothy and Sarah Due (née Jeffery). His father ran the cricket ball manufacturing business, established in 1760 and at the time operating from a series of small-scale workshops as a cottage industry. After taking over the business from his father, Duke significantly developed the business, extending it to develop the manufacturing of cricket equipment, including pads and gloves, as well as partnering with a bat maker Luke Eade. In 1841 he moved the business from Penshurst to a factory at nearby Chiddingstone Causeway, the first time the business had used factory production methods. By the time Duke retired, the company employed more than 80 workers.

Duke's father had played, and his son made his debut for Kent against the Marylebone Cricket Club at Lord's in 1823. He was a bowler, described as "very fast", and in his second match for Kent Duke took seven Sussex wickets at Brighton in 1825. Other than his debut match, all of Duke's top-level cricket was played against Sussex. He is known to have taken 11 wickets, although at the time only wickets which were out bowled were credited to the bowler on scorecards. Although he scored only 24 runs in his five matches, Duke opened the batting frequently in club cricket for Penshurst and Leigh teams.

Duke married Ann Wells at Swallowfield in Berkshire in 1824. The couple had four children. His oldest son, John took over the running of the family business; he played one match for Kent County Cricket Club in 1855. Duke died at East Grinstead in Sussex in 1858. He was aged 58.

== Bibliography ==
- Carlaw, Derek (2020). Kent County Cricketers, A to Z: Part One (1806–1914) (PDF). Cardiff: ACS.
- Haygarth, Arthur (1996) [1862]. Scores & Biographies, Volume 1 (1744–1826). Kennington: Frederick Lillywhite. ISBN 978-19-00592-23-9.
- Haygarth, Arthur (1997) [1862]. Scores & Biographies, Volume 2 (1827–1840). Kennington: Frederick Lillywhite. ISBN 978-19-00592-23-9.
