= John Doak =

John Doak may refer to:

- John Doak (canoeist) (1959–2021), Australian canoeist
- John D. Doak (fl. 1988–2019), American politician

== See also ==
- John Doe (disambiguation)
- John Duke (disambiguation)
