= GDN =

GDN is a three-letter acronym which may refer to:

- The IATA code for Gdańsk Lech Wałęsa Airport in Poland
- The National Rail station code for Godstone railway station in Surrey, England
- Gulf Daily News, an English newspaper in Bahrain
- Global Development Network, a network of research and policy institutes
- Gangster Disciples, a street and prison gang in Chicago, United States
- G.D.N, a 2026 Indian Tamil-language film
- An abbreviation of garden, used as a street suffix
