= Leigh railway station =

Railway station in Kent, England

Leigh (Kent)
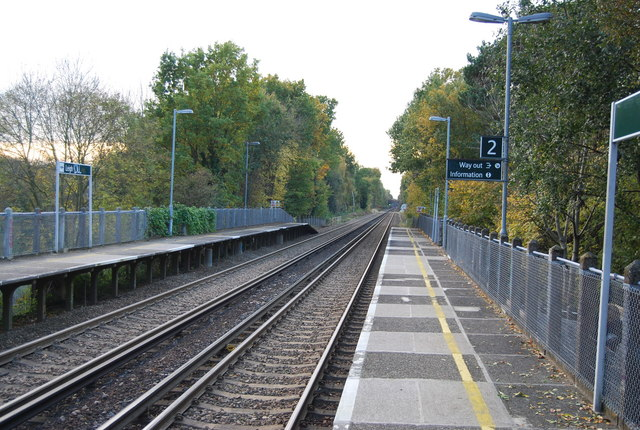

General information
- Location: Leigh, Sevenoaks; England
- Coordinates: 51.194°N 0.211°E
- Grid reference: TQ546461
- Manager: Southern
- Platforms: 2

Other information
- Station code: LIH
- Classification: DfT category F1

Key dates
- 1 Sep 1911: Opened (Leigh Halt)
- Apr 1917: Renamed (Lyghe Halt)
- 1960: Renamed (Leigh Halt)
- 5 May 1969: Renamed (Leigh)
- 1993: Electrified

Passengers
- 2021/22: ▲29,750
- 2022/23: ▲33,310
- 2023/24: ▲40,822
- 2024/25: ▲41,564
- 2025/26: ▼40,682
Location
Notes
- Passenger statistics from the Office of Rail and Road

Leigh railway station is on the Redhill to Tonbridge Line and serves Leigh in Kent, England. It is 39 miles 56 chains (39.70 miles, 63.89 km) measured from London Charing Cross via Redhill. Train services are operated by Southern.

== History ==
The station was opened as "Leigh Halt" in 1911; was renamed "Lyghe Halt" in 1917; "Leigh Halt" again about 1960; and "Leigh" in 1969. (Leigh is pronounced /laɪ/ (lie)—identical with the name of Lye railway station in the West Midlands.). The station was destaffed in 1967.

In 1993 the line was electrified and services started to run through to London rather than being an extension of the Reading to Tonbridge North Downs Line service.

In 2007, a PERTIS machine was installed at the street entrance to the Tonbridge-bound platform (since replaced by a modern ticket machine). The station was until December 2008 operated by Southeastern before it transferred to Southern, whose green signage was installed before October 2008.

== Facilities ==
Leigh station is unstaffed and facilities are limited. Tickets can be purchased from the self-service ticket machine at the station and there are passenger help points located on each platforms. There is also a basic shelter located on each platform. The station has step free access available to both platforms.

== Services ==
All services at Leigh are operated by Southern using Class 377 EMUs.

The typical off-peak service is one train per hour in each direction between Redhill and Tonbridge. A small number of additional services call at the station during the peak hours.

Preceding station	National Rail	Following station
Penshurst	Southern Redhill to Tonbridge Line	Tonbridge

== Future plans ==
In early 2024 Network Rail created a research paper looking into options to increase rail use between Kent and Gatwick Airport. Five options are being looked are:

1. Tonbridge - Redhill - Gatwick Airport 1tph (all day) + Tonbridge - Redhill 1tph (peak only)
2. Tonbridge - Redhill - Gatwick Airport 2tph (all day)
3. Tonbridge - Redhill - Gatwick Airport 1tph (all day) + Tonbridge - Redhill 1tph (all day)
4. Maidstone West - Redhill - Gatwick Airport 1tph fast (all day) + Tonbridge - Redhill 1tph (all day)
5. Ashford International - Redhill - Gatwick Airport 1tph fast (all day) + Tonbridge - Redhill 1tph (all day)
