= Redhill–Tonbridge line =

Railway line in South East England

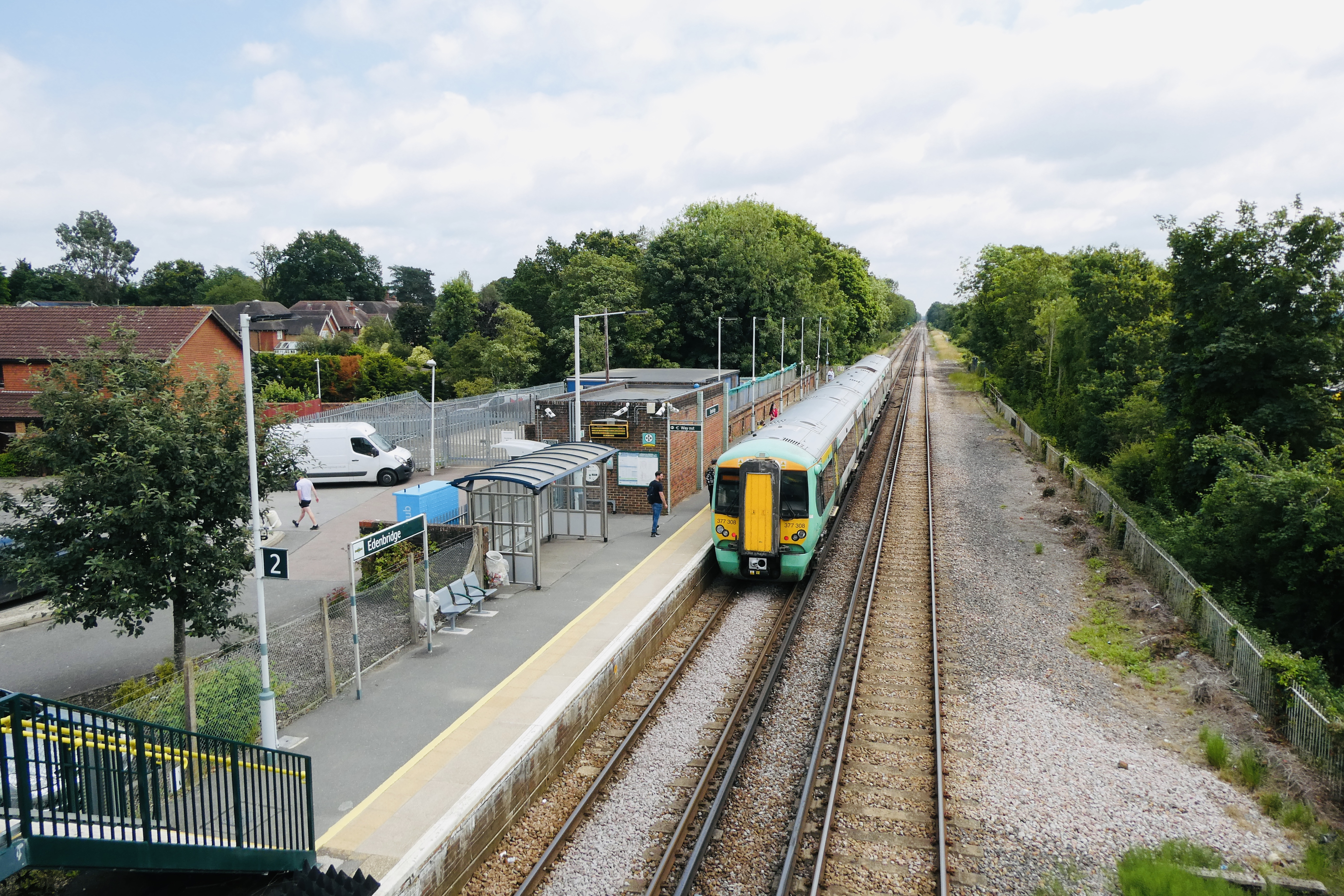
- A Class 377 unit at Edenbridge with a Southern service for Tonbridge

Overview
- Status: Operational
- Owner: Network Rail
- Locale: South East England
- Termini: Redhill, Surrey; Tonbridge, Kent
- Stations: 7

Service
- Type: Heavy rail
- System: National Rail
- Operator(s): Southern
- Rolling stock: Class 377

History
- Opened: 1842

Technical
- Line length: 19 miles 56 chains (31.7 km)
- Number of tracks: 2
- Track gauge: 1,435 mm (4 ft 8 1/2 in) standard gauge
- Electrification: 750 V DC third rail
- Operating speed: 85 mph (137 km/h) maximum
Route map
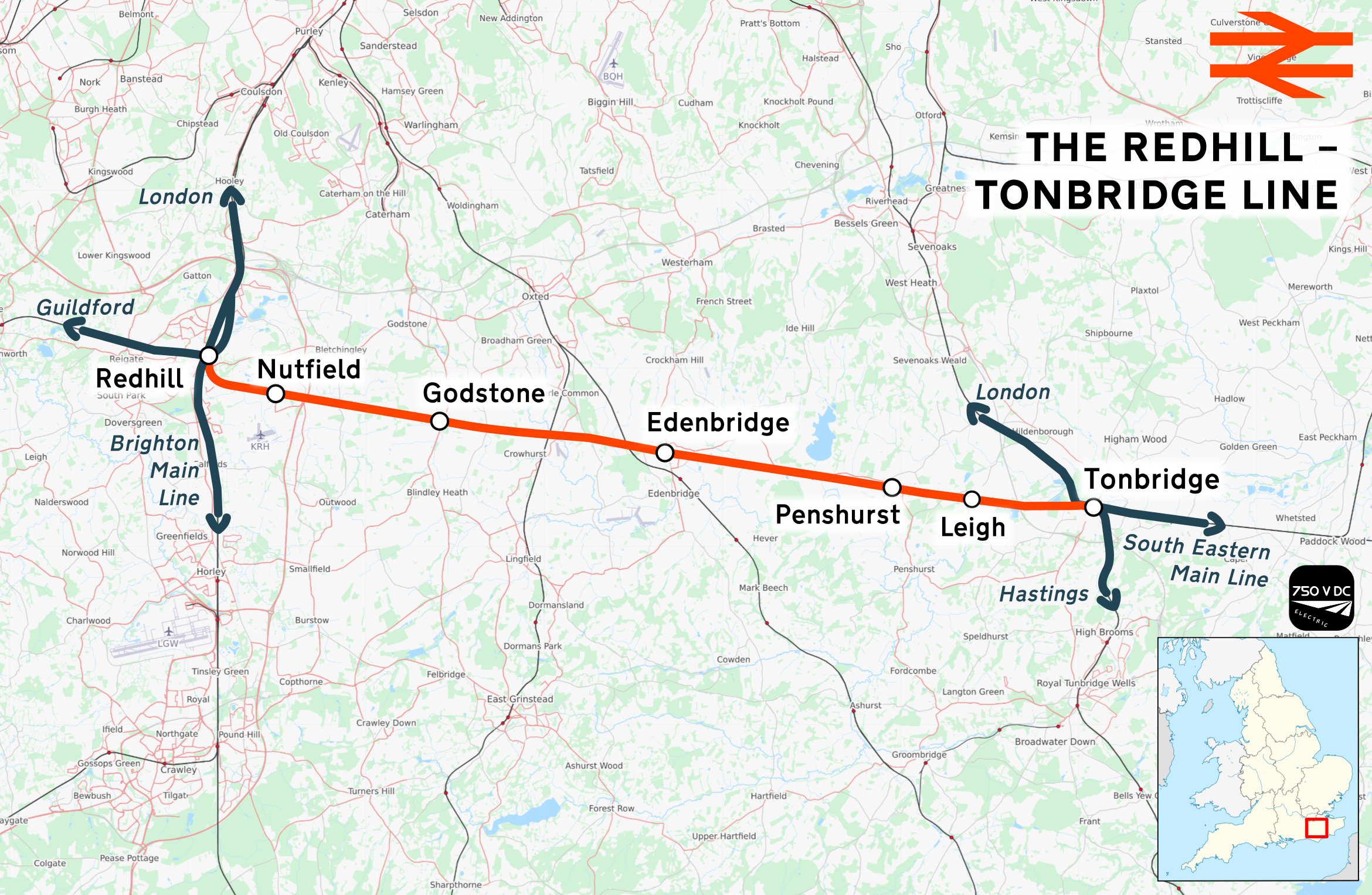

The Redhill–Tonbridge line is a 19-mile-56-chain (31.7 km) railway line in South East England. It runs from the Brighton Main Line at Redhill in Surrey to the South Eastern Main Line at Tonbridge in Kent. There are five intermediate stations: Nutfield, Godstone, Edenbridge, Penshurst and Leigh. All passenger services run as all-stations shuttles between Redhill and Tonbridge, and are operated by Southern using Class 377 electric multiple units.

The route was opened by the South Eastern Railway in 1842 as part of the London to Dover main line. Since it was to be used primarily by express services, the line was engineered with few curves to allow high-speed running. At the time of construction, east Surrey and west Kent were sparsely populated and most of the intermediate stations are some distance from the settlements they purport to serve. In 1868, following the opening of the new main line via Orpington and Sevenoaks, which provided a shorter route from the capital, the Redhill–Tonbridge line was downgraded to secondary status. The line became part of the Southern Railway in 1923 and was incorporated into the Southern Region of British Railways in 1948.

Steam-hauled trains were withdrawn from the Redhill–Tonbridge line in 1965, when diesel multiple units were introduced. The new timetable consisted of an hourly service between Reading and Tonbridge via Redhill. From 1989, these trains were branded as "North Downs" services. In 1994, the line was electrified using the 750 V DC third-rail system, to provide a diversionary route for Channel Tunnel traffic. A new service between Gatwick Airport and Kent was introduced, operated by electric multiple units, which replaced the diesel service from Reading. In 1995, trains running to-and-from London via East Croydon were added.

At privatisation in 1996, responsibility for the Redhill–Tonbridge line was transferred to Connex South Eastern. The company was stripped of its franchise in 2003 and operations were passed to the publicly owned South Eastern Trains. On 1 April 2006, the line was taken over by London & South Eastern Railway as part of the Integrated Kent Franchise, but in 2008, Southern assumed responsibility for all operations. Southern withdrew the Gatwick services that year and trains to-and-from London were discontinued in 2018, establishing the current shuttle service between Redhill and Tonbridge.

== Route ==
=== Infrastructure ===
The Redhill–Tonbridge line is a standard-gauge railway line in Surrey and Kent, England. It runs for 19 miles 56 chains (31.7 km) from the Brighton Main Line at Redhill to the South Eastern Main Line at Tonbridge. The line is electrified using the 750 V DC third-rail system and is double track throughout. Between Redhill and Godstone, the line is controlled by Three Bridges Area Signalling Centre and from Godstone to Tonbridge by Ashford Integrated Electrical Control Centre. With the exception of the Godstone–Edenbridge section, which uses the absolute block method, the signalling system uses track circuits. The maximum permitted speed on the line is 85 mph (137 km/h) and there are speed restrictions on the approaches to Redhill and Tonbridge stations.

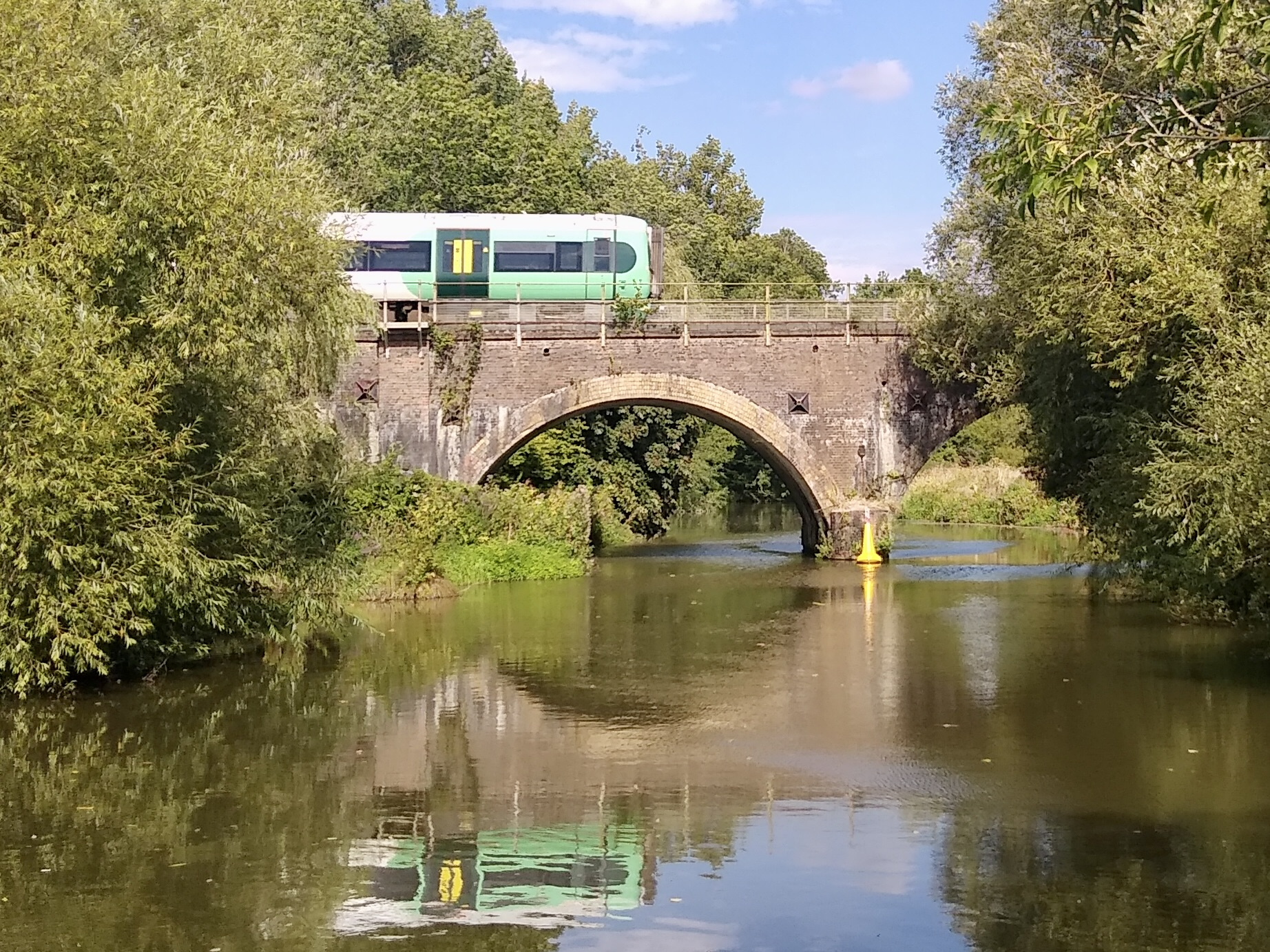
A Class 377 unit crossing the main channel of the River Medway between Leigh and Tonbridge

The underlying geology for the majority of the line is Weald Clay, but to the west of Penshurst the line is on Tunbridge Wells Sand. The line descends from Redhill to Tonbridge and the steepest gradient, to the west of Edenbridge, is 1 in 240. (Note: The elevation of Redhill station is around 50 m (160 ft) higher than that of Tonbridge station.) The M23 motorway and A21 dual carriageway cross over the line on the Coopers Hill and Medway Viaducts respectively. There are two tunnels, the longest of which is the 1,327 yd (1,213 m) Bletchingley Tunnel between Nutfield and Godstone. Between Penshurst and Leigh, the route runs through the 78 yd (71 m) Penshurst Tunnel and crosses the watershed between the Rivers Eden and Medway. The main channel of the Medway is bridged via a six-arch viaduct, the footings of which were strengthened in the early 1980s as part of the Medway Flood Relief Scheme. The line passes through several areas that are prone to flooding, including the river valley between Leigh and Tonbridge.

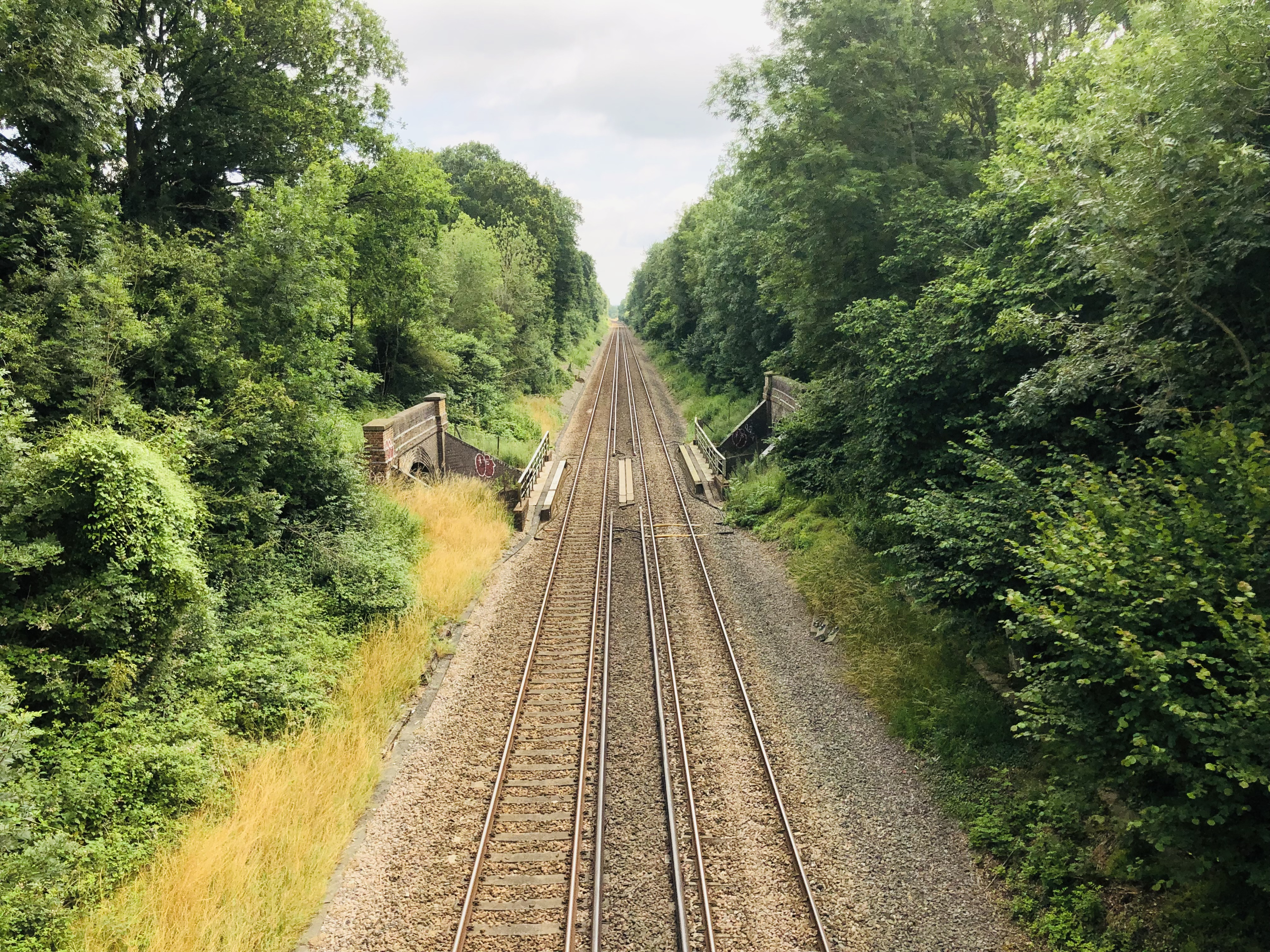
Looking eastwards along the Redhill–Tonbridge line where it crosses Edenbridge Tunnel on the Uckfield branch of the Oxted line

Since it was built as part of the London–Dover main line, the route was engineered for high-speed running. The sharpest curve, of radius 9 ch (180 m), is immediately to the southeast of Redhill, where the line diverges from the Brighton Main Line. The only other significant curve is to the west of Edenbridge station and has a radius of 92 ch (1,900 m). The Redhill–Tonbridge line crosses over the East Grinstead and Uckfield branches of the Oxted line, but there are no direct interchanges between them. (Note: An out-of-station interchange is available between Edenbridge station (on the Redhill–Tonbridge line) and Edenbridge Town station (on the Uckfield branch of the Oxted line), but there is a distance of 1 mi (1.4 km) between the two.) The bridge over the Uckfield branch is positioned near the mid-point of Edenbridge Tunnel (also known as Little Browns Tunnel), which opens out briefly at the crossing point. The Redhill–Tonbridge line also passes over Redhill Tunnel, part of the Quarry line that enables express services on the Brighton Main Line to bypass the junctions at Redhill station. (Note: The Quarry line, including Redhill Tunnel, opened to freight services on 5 November 1899 and to passenger trains on 1 April the following year.)

The pedestrian level crossing at Medhurst Row, between Edenbridge and Penshurst, also provides private vehicle access for local landowners and permission to cross must be sought from the signaller by telephone. There is a speed restriction of 40 mph (64 km/h) on both tracks on the approaches to the Medhurst Row crossing. To the west of Tonbridge station are the Jubilee Sidings, used to stable electric multiple units, and the adjacent Tonbridge West Yard, operated by GB Railfreight. Other freight operators using the line include DB Cargo, Freightliner and Colas Rail.

=== Stations and services ===
There are seven stations on the line: Redhill, Nutfield, Godstone, Edenbridge, Penshurst, Leigh and Tonbridge. All stations are managed by Southern, with the exception of Tonbridge, which is managed by Southeastern. The intermediate stations have two platforms each (Note: Platform 1 at Godstone is the shortest on the line, with a length of 89.9 m (295 ft), and can only accommodate a four-carriage train.) and the two termini have four platforms. (Note: Only Platforms 1 and 2 at Tonbridge are connected to the Redhill–Tonbridge line.) Since the line was built for express services, serving the then sparsely populated areas of east Surrey and west Kent was a secondary concern and the majority of the intermediate stations are some distance from the settlements for which they are named: Godstone station is around 3 mi (4.8 km) south of Godstone village and Penshurst station is in the hamlet of Chiddingstone Causeway, around 2 mi (3.2 km) north of Penshurst itself.

All passenger services on the Redhill–Tonbridge line are operated using Class 377 electric multiple units. Since 2022, the timetable has consisted of an hourly, all-stations service between Redhill and Tonbridge, supplemented with additional services at peak times. The typical journey time between Redhill and Tonbridge is around 30–35 minutes. Since December 2023, two units have been required to operate the weekday timetable. Although Southern provides the rolling stock, the drivers and guards working services on the line are employed by Southeastern.

Stations on the Redhill–Tonbridge line (ordered from west to east)
Station	Distance from Charing Cross via Norwood Junction	Number of platforms	Opening date	Original name	Ref.
Redhill	22 mi 40 ch (36.2 km)	4	26 May 1842 (relocated 15 April 1844)	Reigate	
Nutfield	24 mi 47 ch (39.6 km)	2	1 January 1884		
Godstone	28 mi 13 ch (45.3 km)	2	26 May 1842		
Edenbridge	33 mi 03 ch (53.2 km)	2	26 May 1842	Eden Bridge	
Penshurst	38 mi 03 ch (61.2 km)	2	26 May 1842		
Leigh	39 mi 56 ch (63.9 km)	2	1 September 1911	Leigh Halt	
Tonbridge	42 mi 16 ch (67.9 km)	4 (2 for Redhill trains)	26 May 1842	Tunbridge	

== History ==
=== Proposals and authorisation ===
The earliest formal proposal for a railway line linking London and Dover via Tonbridge was advanced in October 1835. The route, surveyed by the former Royal Engineer, Captain John Pringle, and the architect, Decimus Burton, was to run from the London and Croydon Railway (L&CR) terminus at West Croydon via Oxted, Godstone and Tonbridge. Although the parliamentary committee scrutinising the plans was sceptical of the cost estimates for the embankments and tunnels required, the South Eastern Railway Act was passed on 21 June 1836. It authorised the company to acquire capital of £1.4 million (equivalent to £132 million in 2023) and awarded borrowing powers of up to £450,000 (£53.2 million in 2023). (Note: By May 1836, £982,000 (equivalent to £116 million in 2023) had been raised towards the estimated construction cost of £1.3 million (£123 million in 2023). Most of the money had been pledged by financiers from Liverpool and Manchester, but 112 local subscribers from Kent contributed £215,000 (£25.4 million in 2023).)

The first board meeting of the South Eastern Railway (SER) took place on 2 July 1836, chaired by Pascoe St Leger Grenfell. The board had intended to appoint Henry Palmer as company engineer, but he declined owing to ill health and William Cubitt was appointed instead. (Note: William Cubitt had been the engineer responsible for the construction of the London and Croydon Railway.) Cubitt recommended that the junction between the L&CR and the SER should be further north than that proposed by Pringle and Burton. (Note: William Cubitt's proposal for the SER to branch from the L&CR in the Norwood Junction area allowed the line to have a more favourable gradient profile than would have been achieved with a junction at West Croydon.) The board agreed Cubitt's suggested alterations and construction work began at Riddlesdown on 11 March 1837. The act of Parliament authorising the changes to the route was given royal assent on 3 July 1837.

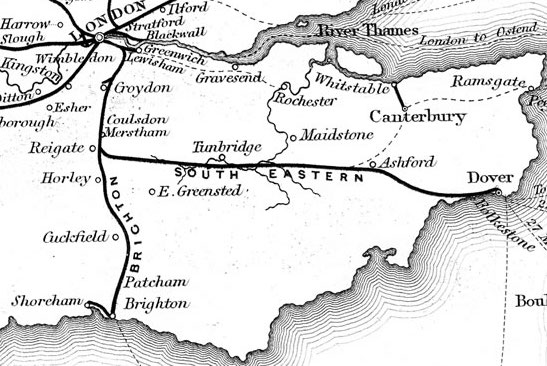
Map from 1840 showing the SER line to Dover branching from the London–Brighton line at Redhill (east of Reigate)

Less than two weeks later, on 15 July 1837, the act of Parliament authorising the London and Brighton Railway (L&BR) was passed. This line would also branch from the L&CR in the Croydon area and would run via Redhill and Haywards Heath to the south coast. Since the SER and L&BR would run alongside each other between Norwood and Purley, the act gave the two companies permission to share a single pair of tracks to avoid duplication. Furthermore, the SER was given the ability to branch from the L&BR at any point north of Earlswood, Surrey. The possibility of sharing part of the L&BR line appealed to the SER, which was experiencing financial difficulties. William Cubitt was instructed to cooperate with Joseph Gibbs, the L&BR engineer, and to explore potential route changes that might result in cost savings. Agreement was reached in November 1838 for the SER to branch from the L&BR at Redhill and the revised plan was approved by act of Parliament on 19 July 1839. (Note: The revised route for the SER via the L&BR between Croydon and Redhill was around 10 mi (16 km) longer than the alignment via Oxted. Burton and Pringle's original route was used by the SER east of Bough Beech (roughly half-way between Edenbridge and Penshurst).)

=== Construction and opening ===
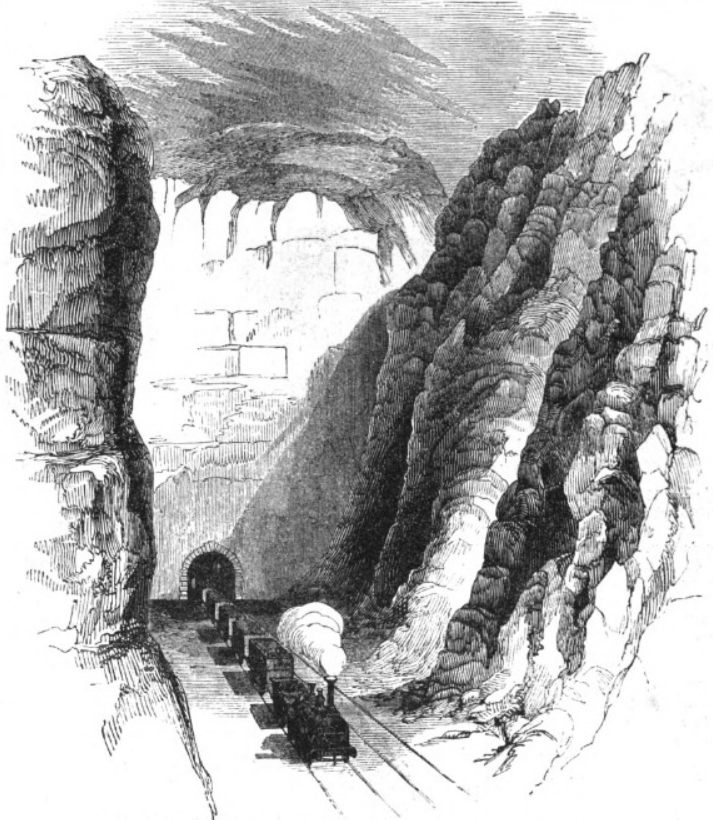
Artist's impression of the first train to run through Bletchingley Tunnel, published in 1843

Construction of the Redhill–Tonbridge section of the SER began at Tonbridge under the supervision of Peter Barlow. (Note: The previous works, started in March 1837 on the original planned alignment at Riddlesdown, had been closed down in 1838.) Materials were delivered via the River Medway Navigation and rails had been laid as far as Edenbridge by 20 November 1841. The works at Bletchingley Tunnel were supervised by Frederick Walter Simms, who wrote a detailed account of the construction in his book, Practical Tunnelling, published in 1844. (Note: Bletchingley Tunnel (then also spelled "Blechingley") was dug through the sandstone-containing Weald Clay of Tilburstow Hill. The 1841 census indicates that around 50,000 navvies worked on this part of the line, most of whom were accommodated at a temporary camp at the west end of the tunnel site.)

The Redhill–Tonbridge line was the first section of the SER to open on 26 May 1842. Five stations opened with the line: Redhill (then called "Reigate"), Godstone, Edenbridge, Penshurst and Tonbridge (then spelled "Tunbridge"). The initial service was four trains per day in each direction, increased to six once the line had been extended to Headcorn on 31 August. The section to Ashford opened on 1 December 1842. Initially the revenue generated was disappointing, but the SER anticipated that passenger numbers would rise once the railway began serving the channel ports. The service was increased to seven trains per day in each direction following the opening of Folkestone Central station on 28 June 1843. The SER was completed to Dover on 7 February 1844.

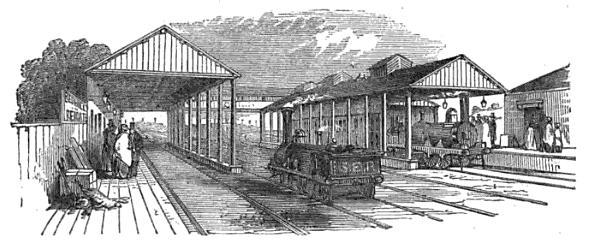
Redhill station c. 1853: The station was opened in 1842 and was moved to its current location in 1844.

The first major alteration to be made to the line was the relocation of Redhill station in 1844. Originally called "Reigate" and sited on Hooley Lane, it was resited to allow better interchange with LB&SCR services to-and-from Brighton. SER trains began using the new station in April 1844. Redhill shed was opened by the SER in 1855. It not only provided locomotives for the line via Tonbridge to Dover, but also for the Reading, Guildford and Reigate Railway, which had opened in 1849 and had been purchased by the SER in 1852.

=== Late 19th century ===
Within a few years of the opening of their main line from London to Dover, the SER began to consider building a more direct line between the capital and Tonbridge to reduce journey times and to avoid conflict with the LB&SCR north of Redhill. The first proposal, surveyed by the engineer Samuel Morton Peto, was presented to Parliament in January 1845, but did not gain approval. In 1859, the line linking Swanley to Sevenoaks, proposed by the Sevenoaks Railway company, was authorised. The SER, fearing further encroachment into its territory from rivals, decided to revive its proposal for a "cut off" line. The "Direct Tonbridge" route, as the new main line was initially known, was authorised on 30 August 1862 and opened in stages in the first half of 1868. On 1 June of that year, most express services were routed along the new line and the Redhill–Tonbridge line was reduced to secondary status. (Note: After the opening of the new main line via Sevenoaks in 1868, at least one express service continued to be routed via Redhill every day until the First World War.)

Nutfield station was opened on 1 January 1884 and was built to serve the new area of residential development that became the village of South Nutfield. The scheme was initiated by Sir Henry Edwards, the former MP for Weymouth and Melcombe Regis, who had acquired land on both sides of the railway in the 1860s. By the early 1880s, he was selling plots for housebuilding and had laid out roads, water mains and sewers. Early landowners of South Nutfield included Myles Fenton, the general manager of the SER, who lived at Ridge Haw from 1886, and Edward Watkin, the then chairman of the railway, who purchased two plots about 1 mile south of the new station. In the mid-1880s, Edwards was given a "free pass", allowing him to travel on the SER with no payment due.

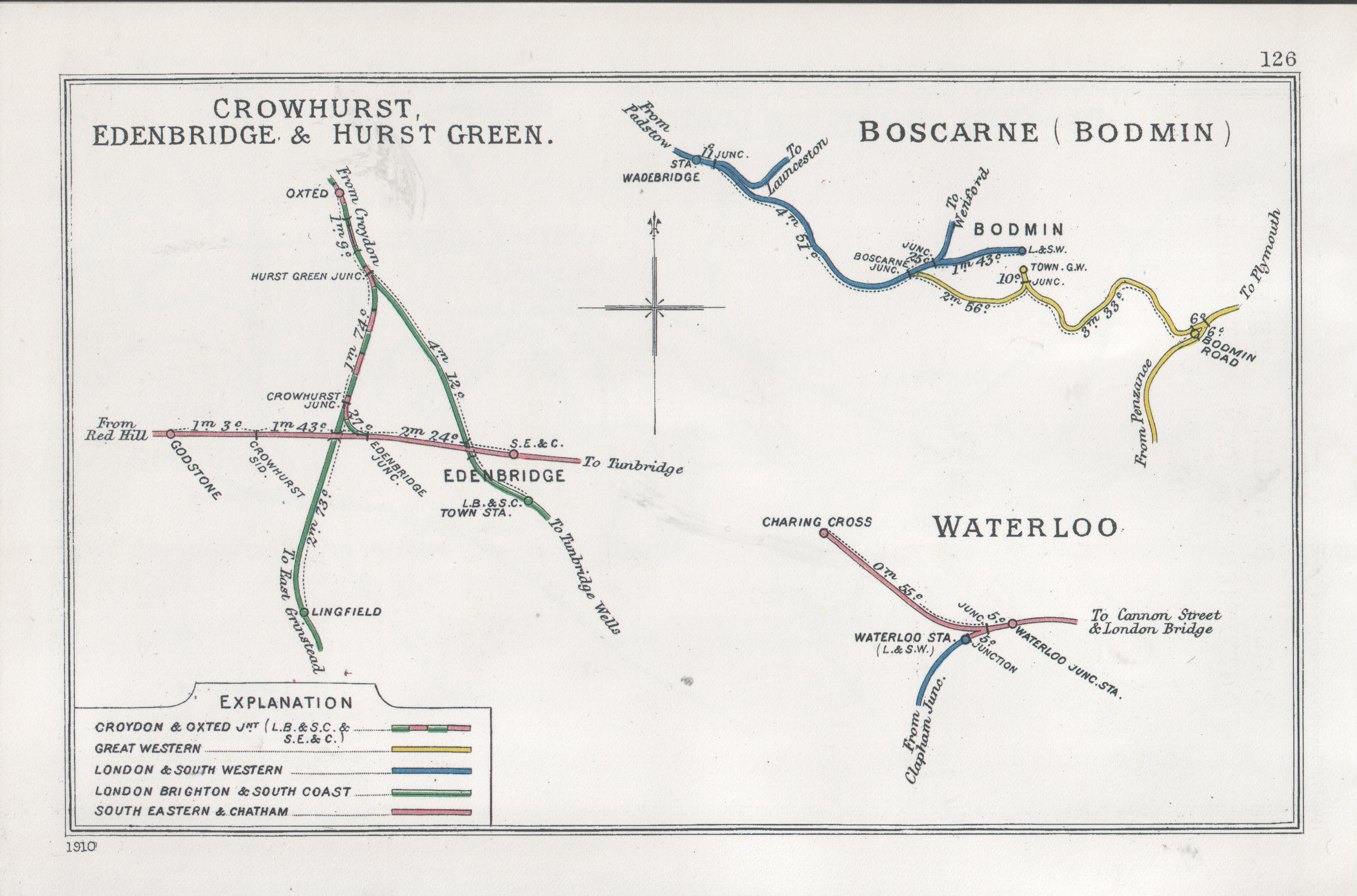
A 1910 Railway Clearing House map showing (left) the Redhill–Tonbridge line and the Crowhurst spur to the East Grinstead branch of the Oxted line.

In 1884, the East Grinstead branch of the Oxted line was opened and with it the Crowhurst spur, linking it to the Redhill–Tonbridge line. The new line was authorised by Parliament in June 1878 and was jointly owned by the SER and LB&SCR between South Croydon and Crowhurst Junction, where the Crowhurst Spur diverged. (Note: Between Crowhurst Junction and East Grinstead, the Oxted line was owned solely by the LB&SCR.) The spur opened to freight on 10 March 1884 and to passenger services on 1 August that year. Initially there were three trains per day between London and Edenbridge via Oxted, of which one continued to Tonbridge. (Note: A water tank was installed at Edenbridge in the mid-1880s for the use of trains terminating there from Oxted.)

=== Early 20th century ===
The final intermediate station to be built between Redhill and Tonbridge was Leigh, which opened as "Leigh Halt" on 1 September 1911. The station was immediately adjacent to Leigh signal box, which had been commissioned in 1902 to reduce the length of the block sections between Penshurst and Tonbridge. Initially the station was constructed entirely in wood, but the platforms were rebuilt in concrete in 1961 and gas lighting was provided around the same time. Work at Godstone station in 1914 and 1915 included the replacement of the original station building with a new two-storey structure, the provision of a footbridge and the lengthening of the platforms. During the First World War, the line was heavily used by trains transporting troops to and from the channel ports.

As a result of the Railways Act 1921, the Redhill–Tonbridge line became part of the Southern Railway in 1923. The following year, the wooden station building at Penshurst was destroyed by fire. It was replaced in 1925 by a new building in the mock-Tudor style. In the mid-1930s, the track layout at Tonbridge was altered to increase the speed limit for trains arriving and departing via Sevenoaks. At the same time, Platform 1, on the south side of the station was converted from a bay to a through platform, and thereafter was used by most trains travelling via Redhill.

The line played a major role in the evacuation of troops from Dunkirk and 565 trains were routed via Tonbridge and Redhill between 27 May and 4 June 1940. In 1941, Tonbridge West Yard was opened to facilitate freight movements for the war effort and in the same year, two-aspect colour light signalling was installed in the Penshurst area to increase the capacity of the line. For much of the Second World War, there was a Home Guard post at the east end of Bletchingley Tunnel.

=== Nationalisation (1948-1996) ===
Under the Transport Act 1947, the Redhill–Tonbridge line became part of the Southern Region of British Railways in 1948. The first Beeching report, published in 1963, recommended shutting all five intermediate stations between Nutfield and Leigh inclusive, although a non-stop passenger service between Redhill and Tonbridge was to be retained. Instead of the proposed partial closure, steam-hauled passenger trains were replaced on 4 January 1965 by Class 206 units. Nicknamed "Tadpoles" and officially designated 3R, these diesel multiple units began operating an hourly stopping service between Reading and Tonbridge, calling at all stations except Winnersh and Earley, and requiring a reversal at Redhill. At the same time, the final through trains between London and Tonbridge via Redhill were withdrawn. The second Beeching report, published in February 1965, recommended that the Redhill–Tonbridge line should be developed as a trunk route for freight services.

With the transition to diesel traction, Redhill shed, which had maintained steam locomotives for use on the line, closed on 14 June 1965. The Crowhurst spur closed on 27 May 1965 and the associated Crowhurst Junction signal box closed that October. The station yard at Edenbridge was the first on the line to be shut on 10 September 1962 and was followed by the closure of goods facilities at Penshurst on 9 September 1963, Godstone on 4 May 1964 and finally Nutfield on 3 January 1966. Staff were withdrawn from the intermediate stations on 5 November 1967 and the station buildings were demolished in the same decade.

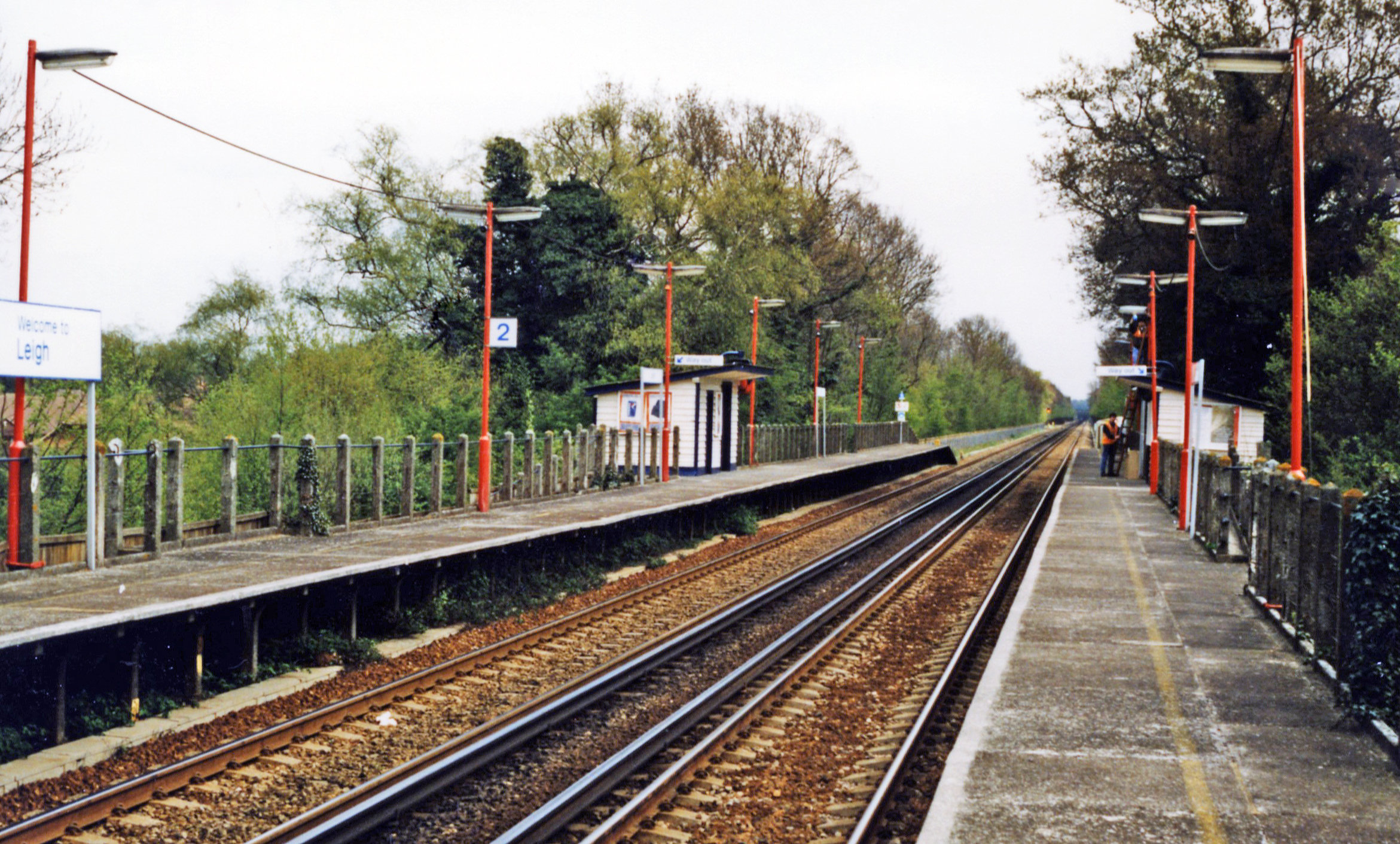
Leigh station in Network SouthEast colour scheme in 1997

From 1982, the Redhill–Tonbridge line came under the control of Network SouthEast, one of the five business sectors of British Rail. (Note: Originally known as the London and South East sector, the name Network SouthEast was used from 10 June 1986.) For three years from May 1986, Reigate became the western terminus for most trains running to Tonbridge via Redhill, with services only extended to Reading at peak times. In 1989, groups of lines in the sector were given names and identities; the Reading–Tonbridge service (along with the Reading–Gatwick Airport service) was branded the "North Downs Line" and the crest of the former Tonbridge Urban District Council was applied to the trains.

Resignalling of the line began with the section between Redhill and Godstone (exclusive), with control transferred to Three Bridges Area Signalling Centre on 12 May 1985. Penshurst and Edenbridge boxes closed in March and May 1986, with control transferred to Ashford Integrated Electronic Control Centre. The signal box at Godstone closed on 31 May 1986 and the station is now the interface between the two signalling areas.

Construction of the Channel Tunnel was authorised by the Treaty of Canterbury in February 1986 and the subsequent Concession Agreement was concluded the following month. As part of the works to connect the tunnel to the existing UK rail network, the Redhill–Tonbridge line was electrified using the 750 V DC third-rail system. The scheme was intended to provide a route for freight trains to access the West London Line via Clapham Junction, whilst avoiding the gauge-restricted Sevenoaks Tunnel. The third rail was energised in March 1994 and the new electric timetable began on 29 May that year. An hourly service was established between Three Bridges and Maidstone West, replacing the previous diesel trains between Reading and Tonbridge. In May 1995, a regular service between London Victoria and Tunbridge Wells, running via the Redhill–Tonbridge line, was added. No new trains were purchased for the electric services, which were operated by rolling stock from the existing Network SouthEast fleet.

=== Privatisation (1996–present) ===
The first privatised franchise holder for the Redhill–Tonbridge line, Connex South Eastern, began running services on 13 October 1996. In 1998, the company switched the London terminus of the services to Tunbridge Wells from Victoria to London Bridge. In 2003, Connex also modified the hourly Three Bridges–Maidstone West service, to run between Horsham and Tunbridge Wells. That June, the company was stripped of its franchise and services were transferred to the publicly owned South Eastern Trains on 9 November 2003.

The Integrated Kent Franchise was awarded to Southeastern, a subsidiary of Govia, for an eight-year period from 1 April 2006. However, in 2008, the services on the Redhill–Tonbridge line and management of the intermediate stations were transferred to Southern. The eastern terminus of the London Bridge–Tunbridge Wells services was cut back to Tonbridge and the Horsham–Tunbridge Wells services were withdrawn. In December 2015, the London terminus of the off-peak services was switched back to Victoria, although trains continued to serve London Bridge at peak times and on Sundays. In May 2018, the London–Redhill portions of all services were withdrawn, leaving the line with the current shuttle between Redhill and Tonbridge. In 2023, Southern reduced the number of units required to operate the weekday timetable on the line from three to two.

== Passenger rolling stock ==
The first steam locomotives to be used on the Redhill–Tonbridge line were SER 2-2-2 engines, built in 1841 by Sharp and Roberts. The following year, 2-2-0 locomotives manufactured by Bury Curtis were delivered. From late 1842 to the end of January 1846, the SER, L&CR and L&BR used engines from a common pool. E class 2-4-0 locomotives were introduced in the early 1860s and hauled passenger services until the end of the 19th century. James Stirling, who was appointed locomotive superintendent at the SER in 1878, introduced F class 4-4-0 engines to the line in 1897.

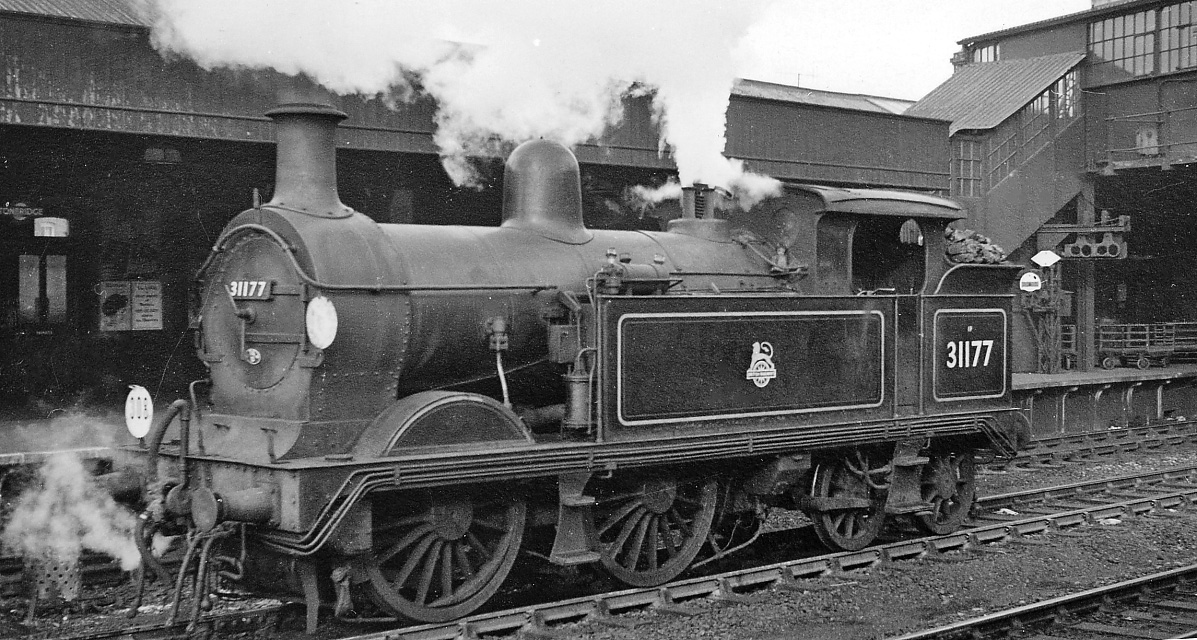
An H class 0-4-4T at Tonbridge in 1958

During the 1930s, the majority of services were worked by F1 and D class 4-4-0s, and H class 0-4-4Ts. Less frequently, passenger trains were hauled by LB&SCR D3 class 0-4-4Ts and E5 class 0-6-2Ts. In the 1950s, the majority of passenger trains were hauled by Maunsell N and U class locomotives, supplemented towards the end of the decade by Standard Class 4 tender and tank engines. From 1959 onwards, electrification schemes elsewhere in Kent allowed LSWR N15 class "King Arthurs" and SR V class "Schools" steam engines to be transferred to the line. Class 33 diesel-electric locomotives began hauling trains in 1962.

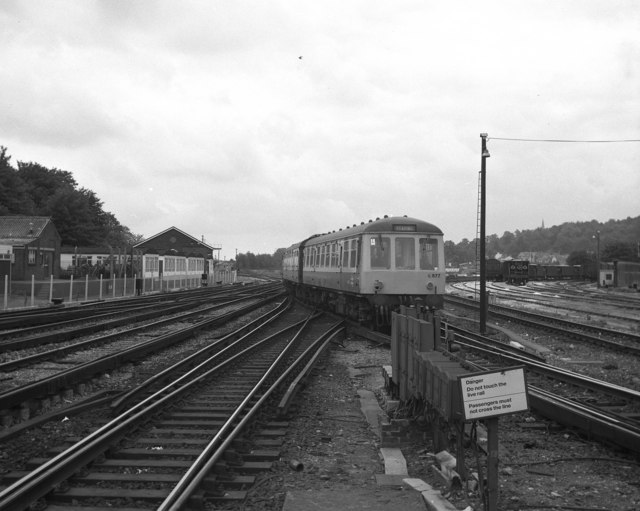
A Class 119 unit approaches Redhill with a service from Tonbridge in 1979.

A new timetable was introduced on 4 January 1965, with Class 206 diesel-electric multiple units operating an hourly, all-stations service between Reading and Tonbridge. The new trains consisted of two 6S (Class 201) coaches from the Hastings line coupled to an adapted 2-EPB driving trailer coach. As a result of the visible difference in width between the narrow Hastings line stock and the standard-width trailer, the units were nicknamed "Tadpoles". Three-car Class 119 units were introduced to the Redhill–Tonbridge line in April 1979 enabling the withdrawal of the Tadpoles in May 1981.

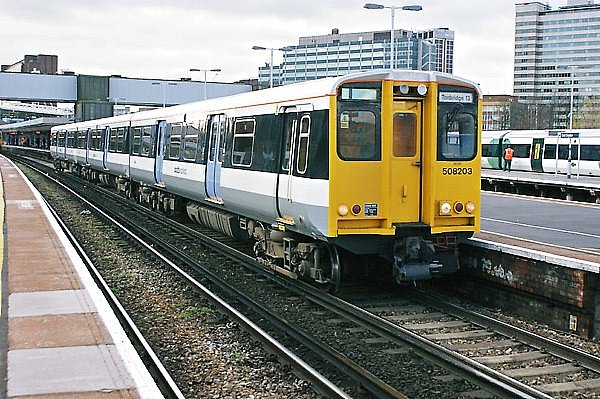
A Class 508 unit in South Eastern Trains livery at East Croydon with a service for Tonbridge via Redhill

Following the electrification of the Redhill–Tonbridge line in 1994, services were worked by electric multiple units from the existing Network SouthEast fleet. The first electric train to run in public service, on 29 May 1994, was a four-carriage Class 423 "4-VEP" unit and initially only Class 421, Class 422 and Class 423 units were cleared to use the line. Between 1998 and 2008, Class 508s operated services on the line. In 2024, all passenger services are operated by Class 377 electric multiple units.

== Freight services ==
The first goods trains began running on the Redhill–Tonbridge line when it opened in 1842 and facilities for handling freight were provided at Gomshall, Edenbridge and Penshurst in 1844. The yard at Godstone was equipped with a crane with a lifting capacity of 3 long tons 7 cwt (7,500 lb or 3.4 t) and one of the sidings sloped steeply down to road level, to allow for onward transport of materials. In the early 20th century, Edenbridge was provided with a crane capable of lifting 4 long tons 0 cwt (9,000 lb or 4.1 t). The station yards at Gomshall, Edenbridge and Penshurst were closed in the early 1960s.

While the line was still being constructed, the SER established a brickworks at South Nutfield. The bricks and tiles produced were transported from a dedicated siding at Mid Street, later the site of Nutfield station. In the 1880s, the works were purchased by Sir Henry Edwards to provide building materials for his new housing development. In 1925, the site was acquired by the Nutfield Manufacturing Company for the production of hydrofluoric acid and other chemicals. The plant was demolished in the mid-1980s and houses were built in its place.

One of the earliest private companies to transport goods via the line was the Upper Medway Navigation Company (UMNC), which constructed a tramway from Tonbridge Wharf to Tonbridge station in 1844. The company intended to use the railway to expand its coal delivery business into Surrey. It purchased land for sidings at Godstone, Edenbridge and Penshurst and hired its own trucks, when the SER refused to provide its own. (Note: The coal sidings at the intermediate stations on the Redhill–Tonbridge line were generally referred to as "wharfs", as a result of their initial ownership by the Upper Medway Navigation Company.) Although the South Eastern Railway Act 1836 permitted independent operators to run trains on the line, the SER refused to certify the locomotive that the UMNC had purchased. The SER and its successors ran trains serving the coal sidings at the intermediate stations between Redhill and Tonbridge until the 1950s.

In 1896, a private siding was opened to serve a new brickworks on the south side of the line around 3/4 mi (1.2 km) west of Godstone station. The works had an internal, 18 in (457 mm) cable-hauled railway in addition to the standard-gauge connection to the main line. During the First World War, part of the site was requisitioned as an ammunition dump. The works were closed during the early 1940s for use by the Canadian Army as an armoured vehicle depot. Brickmaking resumed after the Second World War and eventually ceased in March 2001. The western part of the site was used as a landfill facility for processing spent railway ballast between 1979/1980 and 1993.

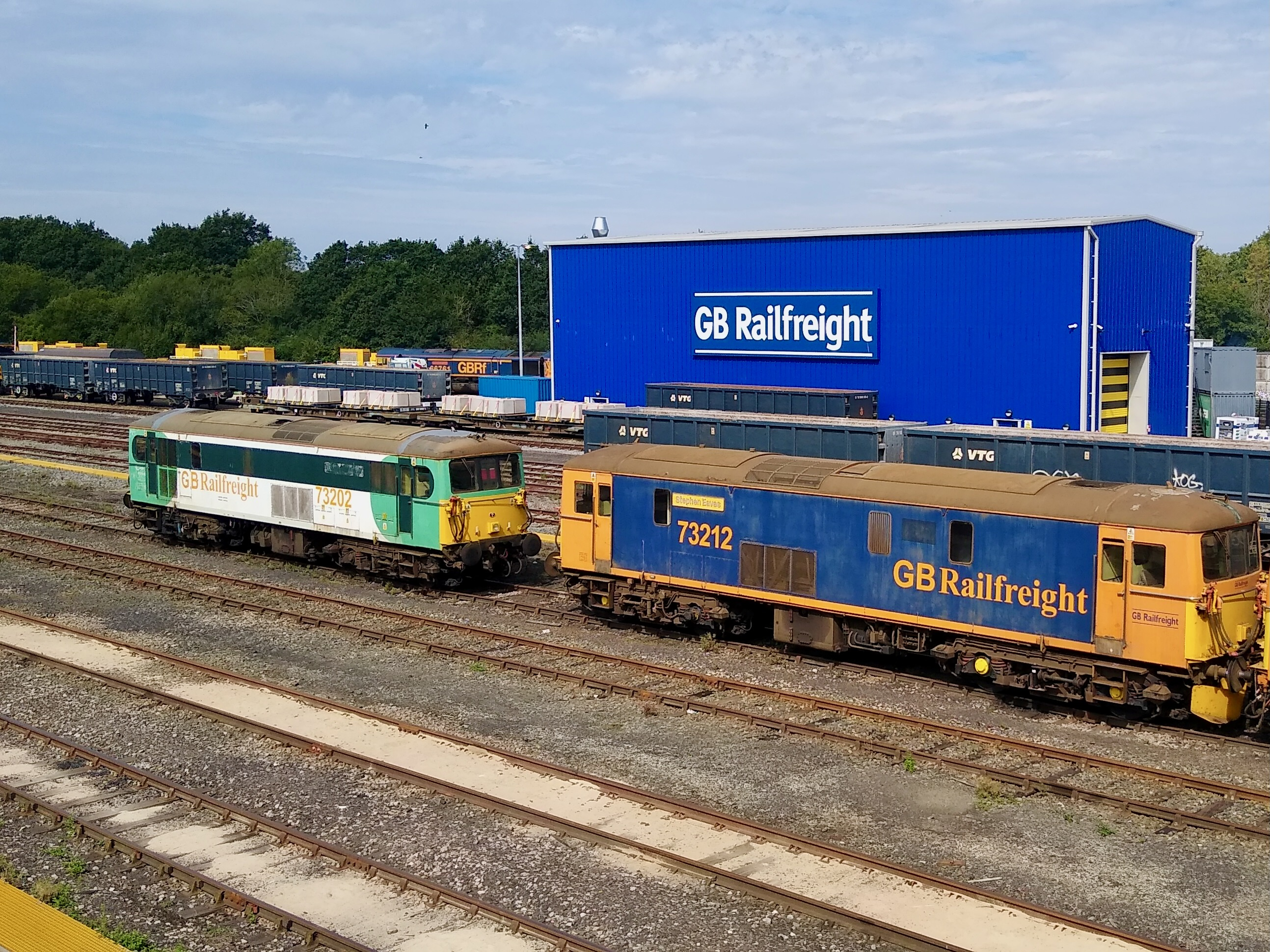
Tonbridge West Yard

Tonbridge West Yard, at the east end of the Redhill–Tonbridge line, was opened in 1941 to facilitate freight traffic movements during the Second World War. It was extended in the late 1950s to allow the closure of Paddock Wood Marshalling Yard and to relieve freight depots in the London area. It is primarily used by engineering trains and has 16 non-electrified tracks. In September 2024, the freight operator, GB Railfreight, opened a new maintenance facility for its Class 66, Class 69 and Class 73 locomotives at the site.

The travelling post office train from Manchester Piccadilly to Dover via Reading, Redhill and Tonbridge was routed along the line from May 1988 until 1996, when a new road and rail postal hub opened at Willesden. Despite the electrification scheme of the mid-1990s, dual-voltage Class 92 locomotives, specifically designed to haul freight and overnight passenger trains via the Channel Tunnel, cannot be used on the Redhill–Tonbridge line owing to incompatibility with the signalling system. The Network Rail 2008 Strategic Business Plan recommended an enhancement project to enable international freight traffic to use the line.

In 2024, the Redhill–Tonbridge line is used by regular freight services, including those operated from Tonbridge West Yard by GB Railfreight. Other freight operators using the line include DB Cargo, Freightliner and Colas Rail.

== Proposals ==
The "Kent Rail Strategy", published in March 2021, proposed re-extending services on the Redhill–Tonbridge line to provide better rail connections between Gatwick Airport and the county east of Tonbridge. In particular, it suggested extending Great Western Railway (GWR) services between Reading and Gatwick to Canterbury West and Ashford. The construction of a new chord at Cuxton, linking the Medway Valley line and North Kent Main Line, could also be used to improve connectivity been the airport and the Medway Towns. Finally, the study noted the importance of the Redhill–Tonbridge line to local school and college students travelling between Edenbridge and Tonbridge.

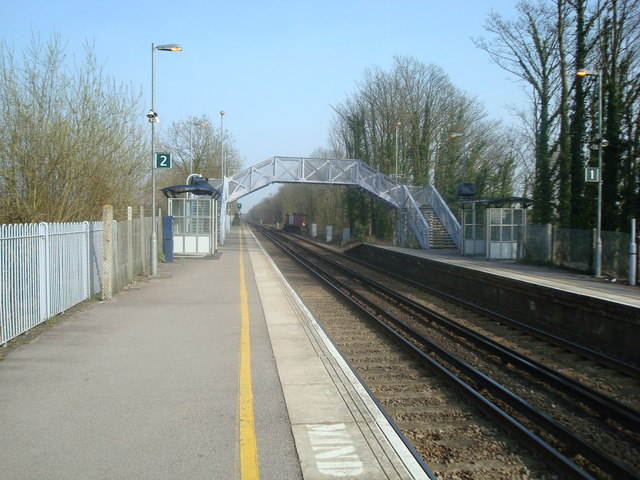
The platform shelters and footbridge at Godstone: The facilities at this station were proposed for improvement in the 2021 Surrey Rail Strategy.

The Surrey Rail Strategy, published in March 2021 under the title "A new rail strategy for Surrey", expressed support for extending services on the Redhill–Tonbridge line to Gatwick Airport, but warned that the reintroduction of services to London was unlikely unless capacity at East Croydon could be increased. It also reported that a programme to improve weather resilience was planned, which would reduce the likelihood of line closures caused by landslips. Finally, the study noted that improvements to facilities at Godstone station could accompany a planned housing development in the area.

The "Kent–Gatwick Rail Connectivity" study, published in March 2024, examined the potential for enhancing services on the Redhill–Tonbridge line to encourage greater use of rail by those travelling to the airport. It noted that online planners frequently recommend routes via London, in preference to journeys requiring changes at both Redhill and Tonbridge. The study examined the options for extending existing services to Gatwick and also for providing additional semi-fast services that might skip some stations on the Redhill–Tonbridge line. It noted that the reduction in the number of units allocated to the line on a typical weekday from three to two, means that additional units would be required to add a significant number of new services or to extend existing ones. The study also observed that there was greater demand for travel between Reading and Gatwick than between Reading and Tonbridge, and that diverting GWR trains away from the airport to Kent would not be beneficial. The report concluded by stating that current rail links between Kent and Gatwick are not attractive and that any future service enhancements are dependent on the development of a full business case, which might require subsidy to cover increased staff and rolling stock costs.

== Accidents and incidents ==
- 28 July 1845: A steam locomotive ran into the back of a passenger train at Penshurst, injuring around 30 people.
- 20 January 1846: A bridge over the River Medway collapsed beneath a freight train during a flood; the driver was killed when he attempted to jump clear.
- 1 February 1853: A passenger train derailed near Penshurst; 12 people were injured.
- 5 March 1909: A passenger train that had travelled from Charing Cross via Redhill, crashed into a mail train at Tonbridge after passing signals set to danger. The fireman of the passenger train and a locomotive inspector were killed.
- 22 December 2019: A landslip between Godstone and Edenbridge closed part of the line. A shuttle train service continued to operate between Edenbridge and Tonbridge, whilst the Redhill–Edenbridge section was served by replacement buses. The line reopened and normal services resumed on 16 March 2020.
- 29 March 2024: A landslip at Bough Beech closed the line for 16 days; the train service was restored on 15 April.

== Bibliography ==
- Baker, Michael H. C. (1989). London to Brighton. Wellingborough: Patrick Stephens Ltd. ISBN 978-1-85-260146-1.
- Beeching, Richard (27 March 1963a). The Reshaping of British Railways Part 1: Report. London: HMSO.
- Beeching, Richard (27 March 1963b). The Reshaping of British Railways Part 2: Maps. London: HMSO.
- Beeching, Richard (16 February 1965). The Development of the Major Railway Trunk Routes. London: HMSO.
- Bridge, Mike, ed. (2017). TRACKatlas of Mainland Britain (3rd ed.). Sheffield: Platform 5. ISBN 978-1-90-943126-3.
- Brown, David; Jackson, Alan A. (1990). Network SouthEast Handbook. Harrow Weald: Capital Transport Publishing. ISBN 978-1-85-414129-3.
- Course, Edwin (1973). The Railways of Southern England : The main lines. London: Batsford. ISBN 978-0-71-340490-6.
- Deacon, Richard (2000). Nutfield : Our Village since Domesday. Nutfield: Nutfield Local History Group. OCLC 45854436.
- Gourvish, Terry (2002). British Rail 1974-1997: From Integration to Privatisation. Oxford: Oxford University Press. ISBN 978-0-19-925005-9.
- Gray, Adrian (1990). South Eastern Railway. Midhurst: Middleton Press. ISBN 978-0-90-652085-7.
- Green, Chris; Vincent, Mike (2014). The Network SouthEast Story. Hersham: Ian Allan Ltd. ISBN 978-0-86-093653-4.
- Glover, John (2001). Southern Electric. Hersham: Ian Allan Ltd. ISBN 978-0-71-102807-4.
- Hadfield, Charles (1969). The Canals of South and Southeast England. Newton Abbot: David & Charles. ISBN 978-0-71-534693-8.
- Jackson, Alan A. (1999). The Railway in Surrey. Penryn: Atlantic Transport Publishers. ISBN 978-0-90-689990-8.
- Kidner, R.W. (1974). The Reading to Tonbridge Line. Headington: Oakwood Press. ISBN 978-0-85-361156-1.
- Mitchell, Vic; Smith, Keith (1990). Redhill to Ashford. Country rail routes. Midhurst: Middleton Press. ISBN 978-0-90-652073-4.
- Morrison, Brian; Beer, Brian (1994). Kent and East Sussex. British Railways Past and Present. Vol. 20. Rushden: Silver Link Publishing. ISBN 978-1-85-895044-0.
- Oliver, Bruce (2011). Southern EMUs since Privatisation in Colour: For the Modeller and Historian. Hersham: Ian Allan Ltd. ISBN 978-0-71-103627-7.
- Oppitz, Leslie (1988a). Surrey Railways Remembered. Newbury: Countryside Books. ISBN 978-1-85-306005-2.
- Oppitz, Leslie (1988b). Kent Railways Remembered. Newbury: Countryside Books. ISBN 978-1-85-306016-8.
- Penn, Roger (1981). Portrait of the River Medway. London: Robert Hale. ISBN 978-0-70-919434-7.
- Quick, Michael (2023) [2001]. Railway Passenger Stations in Great Britain (PDF) (5.05 ed.). London: Railway and Canal Historical Society.
- Staines, David (2010). Kent Railways. Newbury: Countryside Books. ISBN 978-1-84-674211-8.
- Thomas, Andy (2022). Kent. Railways of the South East. Vol. 2. Stamford: Key Publishing. ISBN 978-1-91-387081-2.
- Turner, J.T. Howard (1977). The London, Brighton & South Coast Railway. Vol. 1 : Origins and formation. London: B.T. Batsford. ISBN 978-0-71-340275-9.
- Turner, J.T. Howard (1979). The London, Brighton & South Coast Railway. Vol. 3 : Completion and maturity. London: B.T. Batsford. ISBN 978-0-71-341389-2.
- Welch, Michael (2011). Southern Counties Main Line Steam. Crowthorne: Capital Transport. ISBN 978-1-85-414349-5.
- Whishaw, Francis (1840). The Railways of Great Britain and Ireland: Practically Described and Illustrated (1st ed.). London: Simpkin, Marshall and Co. OCLC 458980524.
- "Kent / Sussex / Wessex Routes Sectional Appendix" (PDF). Network Rail. 2024 [2009].
- "Delivering a better railway for a better Britain | Route Specifications: South East" (PDF). Network Rail. 2016.
- "Kent Rail Strategy" (PDF). Kent County Council. March 2021.
- "A new rail strategy for Surrey" (PDF). Surrey County Council. March 2021.
- "Kent–Gatwick Rail Connectivity" (PDF). Network Rail. 2024. Archived (PDF) from the original on 26 April 2025.
