= Nutfield railway station =

Railway station in Surrey, England

Nutfield
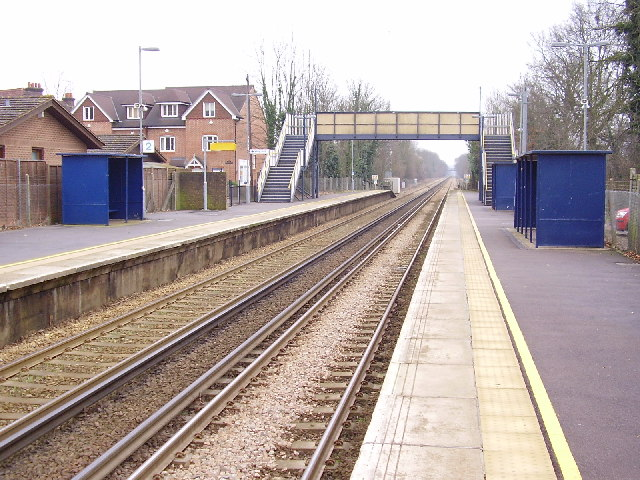

General information
- Location: Nutfield, Tandridge; England
- Coordinates: 51.227°N 0.133°W
- Grid reference: TQ304491
- Manager: Southern
- Platforms: 2

Other information
- Station code: NUF
- Classification: DfT category F2

History
- Original company: South Eastern Railway
- Pre-grouping: South Eastern and Chatham Railway
- Post-grouping: Southern Railway

Key dates
- 1 January 1884: Opened

Passengers
- 2021/22: ▲50,248
- 2022/23: ▲56,454
- 2023/24: ▼49,042
- 2024/25: ▲54,730
- 2025/26: ▲60,060
Location
Notes
- Passenger statistics from the Office of Rail and Road

Nutfield railway station is on the Redhill to Tonbridge Line and serves Nutfield, Surrey, England. It is about a mile south of Nutfield itself, located in South Nutfield, a settlement which did not exist before the coming of the railway. It is 24 miles 47 chains (24.59 miles, 39.57 km) measured from London Charing Cross via Redhill.

Since 2008 the station, and all trains serving it, have been operated by Southern, following the ending of the previous Southeastern service.

== History ==
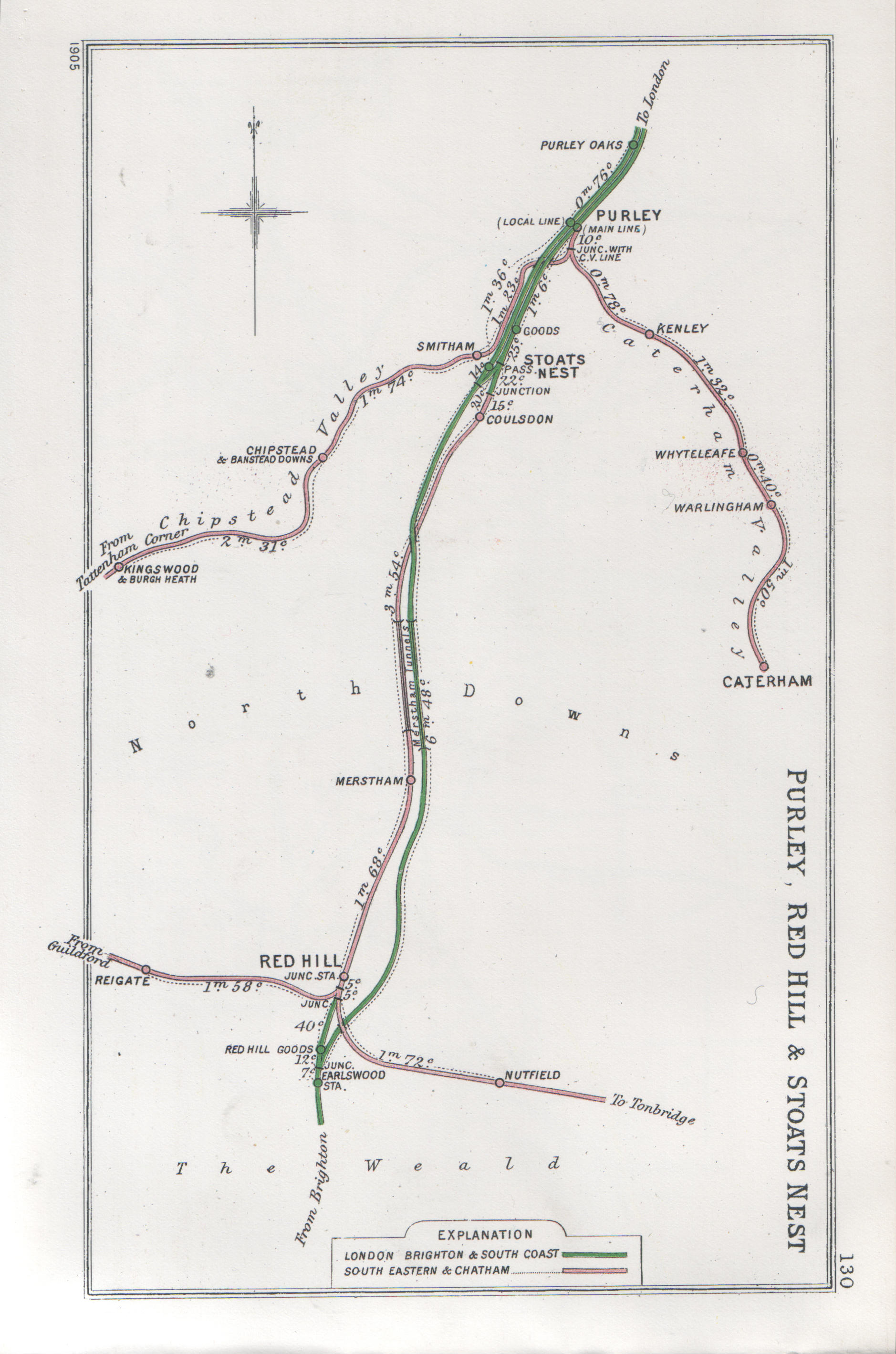
A 1905 Railway Clearing House map of lines around Nutfield railway station.

The railway line between Redhill and Tonbridge was opened by the South Eastern Railway on 26 May 1842. Nutfield station opened on that line on 1 January 1884, although a public siding named 'Mid Street' had been provided here from an early date.

The station buildings were similar in style to those at Sandling Junction, although no footbridge was provided at Nutfield. The buildings were demolished in the late 1960s. Until electrification all passengers crossed the lines at rail level at the Western end of platforms, close to the signal box.

For many years a private siding from Nutfield station served the chemical works of the Nutfield Manufacturing Company, situated Southwest of the station on the site of a former brickworks.

Goods facilities were withdrawn in January 1966, and coal traffic ceased in November of that year. Full-time staffing ended on 5 November 1967 but staff was frequently provided at morning commuter peak hours until around 1990. The signal box remained in use until 10 May 1970.

In 1993 the line was electrified and services started to run through to London rather than being an extension of the Reading to Tonbridge North Downs Line service.

In 2018 direct services to/from London were cut, with a Redhill - Tonbridge shuttle service operating instead.

== Station facilities ==
The two platforms are linked by a footbridge.

Trains heading to Tonbridge have an information board displaying the next train details, and in May 2011 an information board was installed on Platform 1 which heads to Redhill and London.

There is a ticket machine on platform 1 and a bike rake on platform 2. Both platforms have a shelter, smart card validator and a help point.

== Services ==
All services at Nutfield are operated by Southern using Class 377 EMUs.

The typical off-peak service is one train per hour in each direction between Redhill and Tonbridge. A small number of additional services call at the station during the peak hours.

Preceding station	National Rail	Following station
Redhill	Southern Redhill to Tonbridge Line	Godstone

== Connections ==
Bus route 315 operated by Cruisers Ltd stops near the station. A limited service of three buses towards Redhill and 4 towards Smallfield Monday to Friday only.

School bus route 612, operated by Metrobus, also serves Nutfield station with one service to and from Oxted school each school day.

== Future Plans ==
In early 2024 Network Rail created a research paper looking into options to increase rail use between Kent and Gatwick Airport. Five options are being looked are:

1. Tonbridge - Redhill - Gatwick Airport 1tph (all day) + Tonbridge - Redhill 1tph (peak only)
2. Tonbridge - Redhill - Gatwick Airport 2tph (all day)
3. Tonbridge - Redhill - Gatwick Airport 1tph (all day) + Tonbridge - Redhill 1tph (all day)
4. Maidstone West - Redhill - Gatwick Airport 1tph fast (all day) + Tonbridge - Redhill 1tph (all day)
5. Ashford International - Redhill - Gatwick Airport 1tph fast (all day) + Tonbridge - Redhill 1tph (all day)
