= St Luke's Church, Chiddingstone Causeway =

Coordinates: 51.1975°N 0.1759°E

St Luke's Church
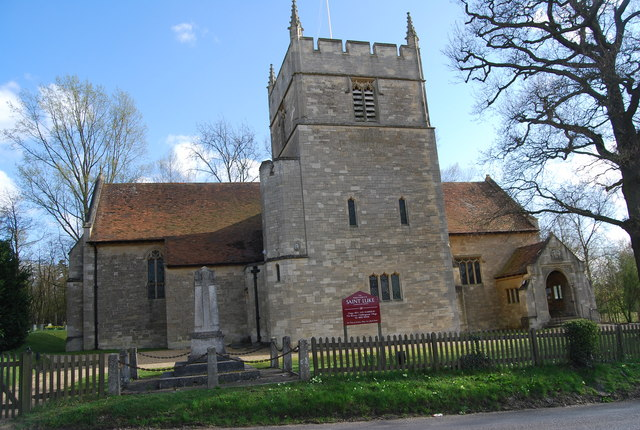
- St Luke's Church, Chiddington Causeway. The WWI & WWII memorial is visible to the left of the tower.
- St Luke's Church
- OS grid reference: TQ 52122 46502
- Country: England
- Denomination: Church of England
- Website: St Lukes - a Church near You

History
- Dedication: Luke the Evangelist

Architecture
- Heritage designation: Grade II*
- Designated: 10 September 1954
- Architect: John Francis Bentley
- Architectural type: Decorated Gothic Revival
- Years built: 1897-1898

Administration
- Province: Canterbury
- Diocese: Rochester

Clergy
- Rector: Lisa Cornell

St Luke is a Grade II* listed Church of England church in Chiddingstone Causeway, Kent. It was built in 1897–1898 to a design by John Francis Bentley in a loosely Decorated Gothic Revival style, replacing a tin tabernacle (erected circa 1873).

In 1873 the local population had grown significantly as a result of Duke & sons cricket bat and ball factory having been opened. Miss Nellie Hills, daughter of Frank Clarke Hills of Redleaf, felt that this, combined with the distance to the Penshurst Parish Church meant that more local church services were needed. Evening Services began in a newly built schoolroom. These were well attended, so a purpose built iron structure was constructed on the east boundary of the current churchyard. This was called St Saviour's church.

A permanent structure was commissioned by Constance Hills (nee Wynne-Roberts) of Redleaf, Penshurst (sister-in-law of Nellie Hills) and financed by her and surviving family members. She built it to commemorate her late husband Frank Ernest Hills (died 1896), his brother Ernest Henry Hills and their parents Frank Clarke Hills and Ann Ellen Hills (nee Rawlings) who had all recently died within a short period.

Constance Hills, benefactor of the church, while in mourning.

The portrait painter John Singer Sargent recommended Bentley to her. It was the only Protestant church designed by Bentley. The church was consecrated on St Lukes' Day (18th October), 1898.

Since 2019 the church has been part of the High Weald Churches benefice of Penshurst, Chiddingstone, Fordcombe and Chiddingstone Causeway.

The altar window is the work of Wilfrid de Glehn.

Among those buried at the church is Arnold Hills, brother of Nellie Hills and brother-in-law of Constance Hills, who lived at Hammerfield after the closure of his Thames Iron Works shipyard in 1912. Hills donated the site for the church and contributed to the fund to build it. Hills is best known for establishing West Ham United football club.
