= Edenbridge railway station =

Railway station in Kent, England

Edenbridge
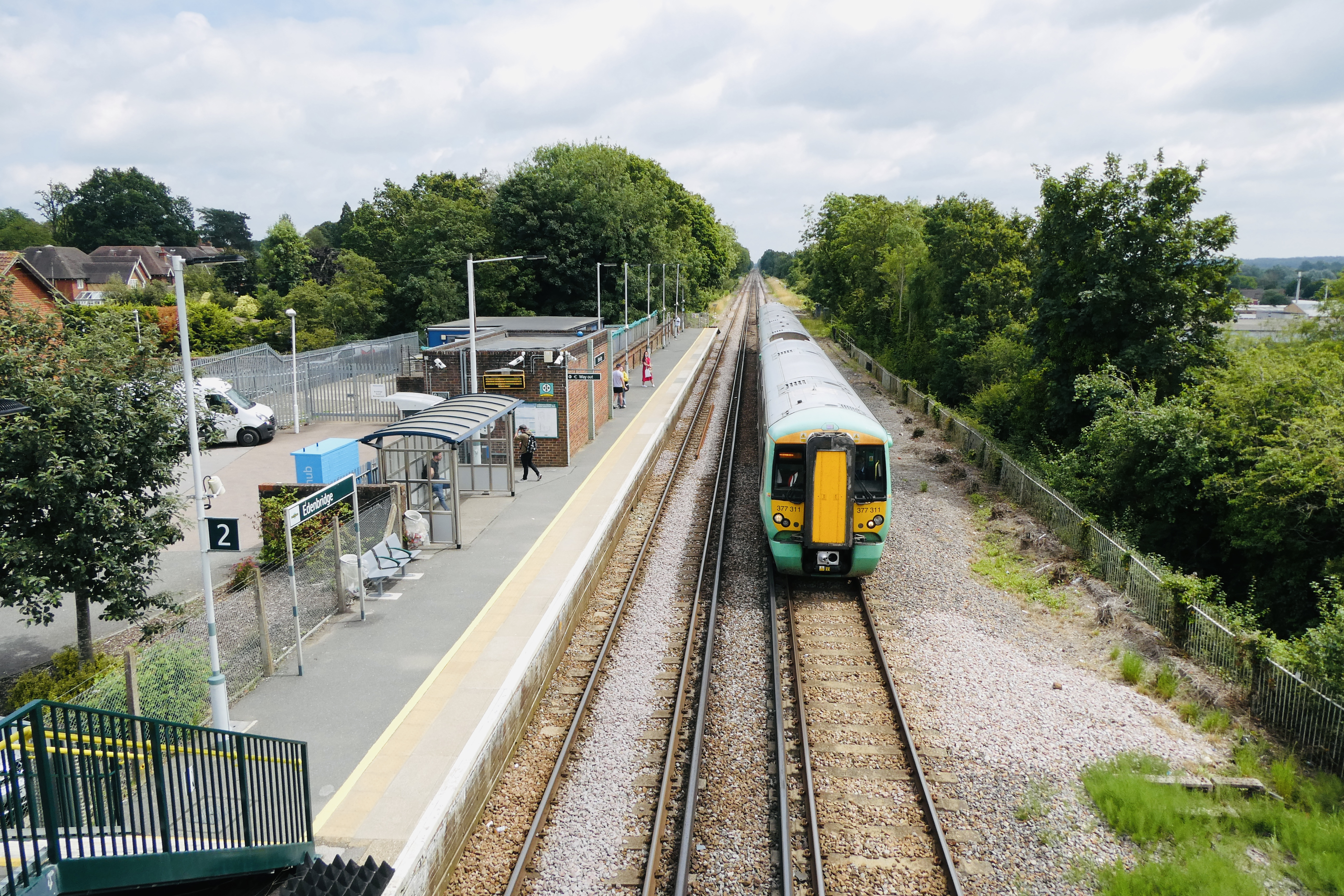
- 377311 arriving at Edenbridge with a Southern service from Tonbridge to Redhill

General information
- Location: Edenbridge, Sevenoaks; England
- Coordinates: 51.208°N 0.061°E
- Grid reference: TQ440474
- Manager: Southern
- Platforms: 2

Other information
- Station code: EBR
- Classification: DfT category F1

Key dates
- 26 May 1842: Opened

Passengers
- 2020/21: ▼68,602
- Interchange: ▼9,547
- 2021/22: ▲0.135 million
- Interchange: ▲29,200
- 2022/23: ▲0.154 million
- Interchange: ▲39,025
- 2023/24: ▲0.160 million
- Interchange: ▲39,966
- 2024/25: ▲0.176 million
- Interchange: ▼9,145
Location
Notes
- Passenger statistics from the Office of Rail and Road

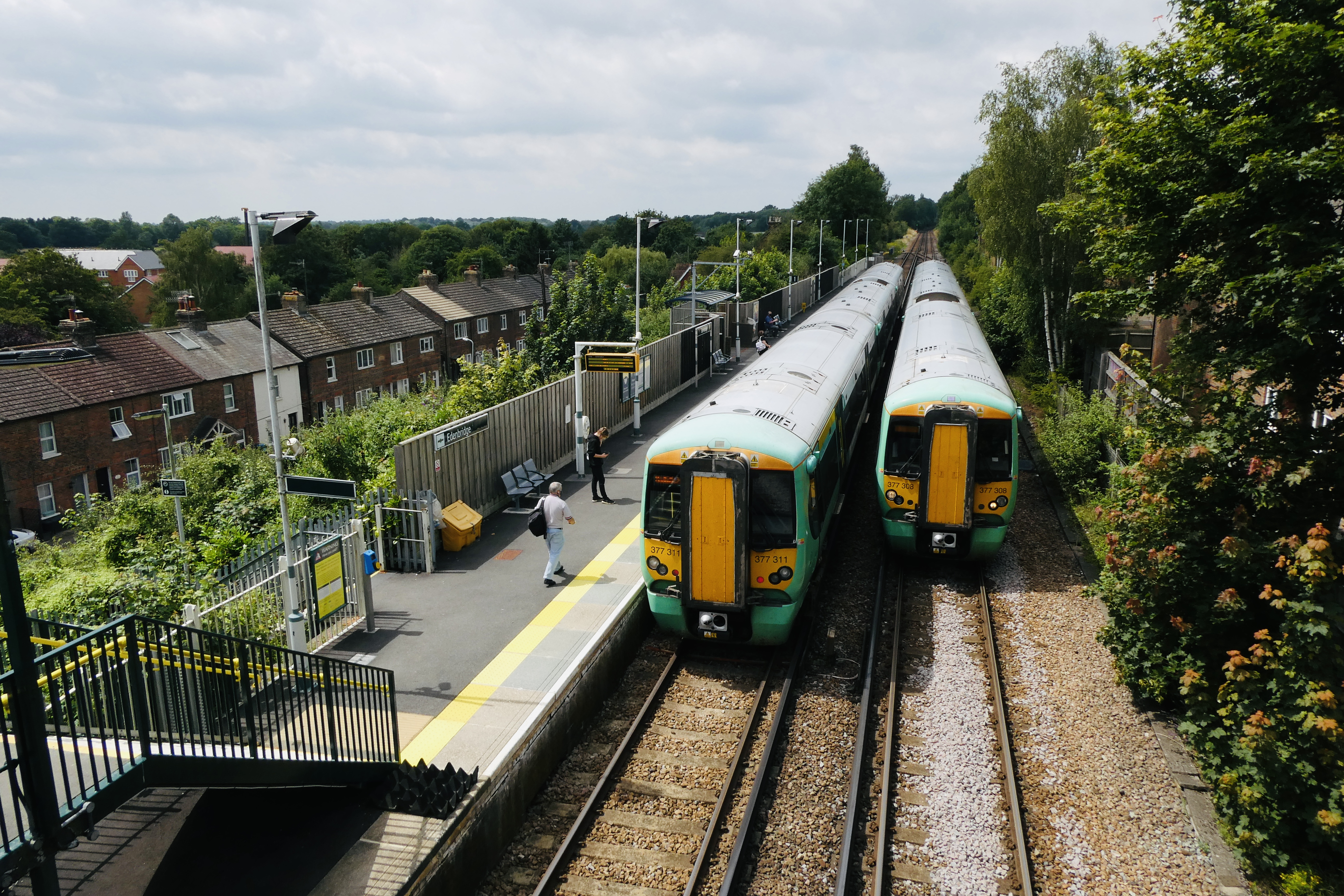
377311 and 377308 at Edenbridge with Southern services bound for Redhill and Tonbridge respectively

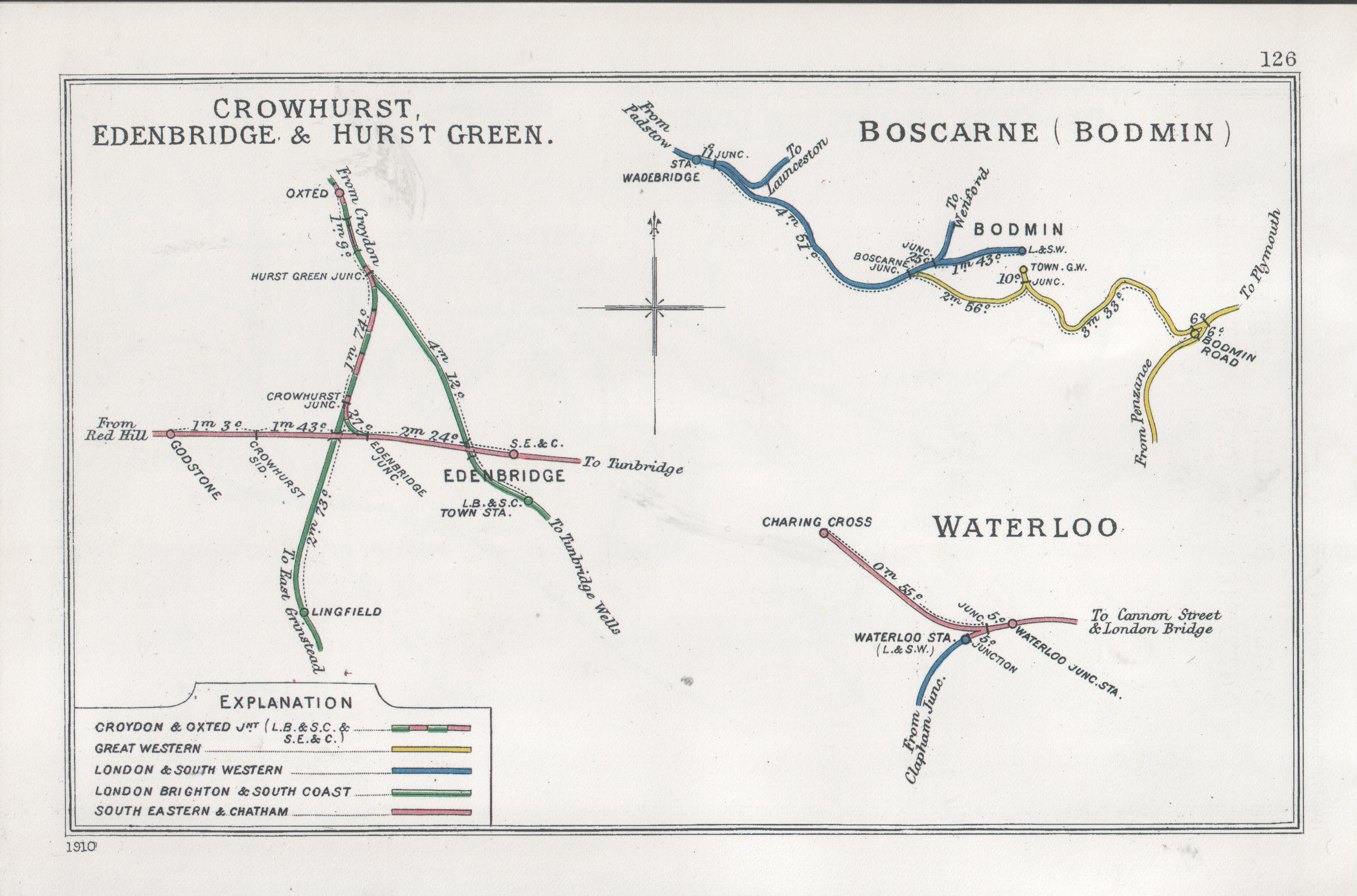
A 1910 Railway Clearing House map of lines around Edenbridge railway station.

Edenbridge railway station is one of two stations serving Edenbridge in Kent, England. It is 33 miles 3 chains (33.04 miles, 53.17 km) measured from London Charing Cross via Redhill. Train services are operated by Southern.

== History ==
The station was opened on 26 May 1842.

In 1967 the station became unstaffed following which the original station buildings were demolished.

In 1993 the line was electrified and services started to run through to London rather than being an extension of the Reading to Redhill North Downs Line service.

In 2007, a PERTIS machine was installed at the street entrance to the Tonbridge-bound platform. This has since been replaced with a self-service ticket vending machine as common on larger stations. Until December 2008 Edenbridge station was operated by Southeastern before it transferred to Southern, whose green signage was installed before October 2008.

In 2018 direct services to/from London were cut, with a Redhill - Tonbridge shuttle service operating instead.

== Facilities ==
Edenbridge station is unstaffed and facilities are limited. Tickets can be purchased from the self-service ticket machine at the station and there are passenger help points located on each platforms. There is also a basic shelter located on each platform. The station has a free car park (operated by Saba Parking).

The Tonbridge bound platform is accessible without steps although the Redhill bound platform is only reachable through the use of steps.

== Connections ==
Three local buses and one school route serve the station.

Metrobus route 231 links Edenbridge with Tunbridge Wells via Fordcombe. Four buses a day run each way Monday to Saturday, one of which continues to/from Lingfield. There is no Sunday service.

Metrobus route 233 also links Edenbridge with Tunbridge Wells, but via Bidborough instead. Six buses a day run to Edenbridge, five to Tunbridge Wells, Monday to Friday. The first bus of the day starts from Lingfield and two afternoon trips are extended to Lingfield. On Saturdays this is reduced to four buses each way, the first and last of which start/finish in Lingfield. There is no service on Sundays.

Metrobus route 236 runs between Oxted and Lingfield, Monday to Fridays only. Four buses run to Oxted and five to Lingfield.

School route 646, also operated by Metrobus, runs between East Grinstead and Oxted. One bus a day runs in each direction on school days only.

== Services ==
All services at Edenbridge are operated by Southern using Class 377 EMUs.

The typical off-peak service is one train per hour in each direction between Redhill and Tonbridge. A small number of additional services call at the station during the peak hours.

Preceding station	National Rail	Following station
Godstone	Southern Redhill to Tonbridge Line	Penshurst

== Future Plans ==
In early 2024 Network Rail created a research paper looking into options to increase rail use between Kent and Gatwick Airport. Five options are being looked are:

1. Tonbridge - Redhill - Gatwick Airport 1tph (all day) + Tonbridge - Redhill 1tph (peak only)
2. Tonbridge - Redhill - Gatwick Airport 2tph (all day)
3. Tonbridge - Redhill - Gatwick Airport 1tph (all day) + Tonbridge - Redhill 1tph (all day)
4. Maidstone West - Redhill - Gatwick Airport 1tph fast (all day) + Tonbridge - Redhill 1tph (all day)
5. Ashford International - Redhill - Gatwick Airport 1tph fast (all day) + Tonbridge - Redhill 1tph (all day)

== See also ==
- Edenbridge Town railway station, the other station in the town
