= John Duke (cricketer) =

English cricketer

Personal information
- Born: 24 August 1830; Penshurst, Kent
- Died: 7 November 1890 (aged 60); Penshurst, Kent
- Bowling: Hand
- Role: Bowler
- Relatives: Timothy Duke (father)

Domestic team information
- Years: Team
- 1855: Kent
- Only FC: 19 July 1855 Kent v Sussex
- Source: Cricinfo, 9 March 2017

John Duke (24 August 1830 – 7 November 1890) was an English businessman and cricketer who was a member of the family which established Dukes, the manufacturer of cricket balls. He played one first-class match for Kent County Cricket Club in 1855.

Duke was born at Penshurst in Kent in 1830, the eldest son of Timothy Duke and his wife Ann (née Wells). His father ran the cricket ball manufacturing business and had played five first-class matches for Kent during the 1820s, before the formation the first county club. The business had been established in the 1760s by John Duke's grandfather, also Timothy.

A fast bowler like his father, Duke had "a considerable reputation" as a club cricketer, playing for Penshurst and Sevenoaks Vine. He took 12 wickets in a match for Sevenoaks against Marylebone Cricket Club (MCC) in 1850 and nine against I Zingari in 1849. In his only first-class match, played against Sussex at the Gravesend in July 1855, he took three wickets for 23 runs in the first innings, but bowled only five overs in Sussex's second innings. He had dislocated his knee whilst fielding in 1854 and the injury brought his career to an end soon afterwards. As a batsman, Duke had little skill and he bagged a pair in his only first-class match, as Kent lost by two runs.

Duke took over the family business, which had been established in the 18th century, following the death of his father in 1858. By this time it was the leading producer of cricket balls in England and employed more than 80 workers, hand making balls in a factory at Chiddingstone Causeway near Penshurst. His father had developed the company and by this time it produced a range of cricket equipment as well as making balls. The Dukes ball is still used in British cricket.

In 1857 Duke married Frances Wood at Southwark; the couple had six children. He died at Penshurst in 1890 aged 60.

== Bibliography ==
- Carlaw, Derek (2020). Kent County Cricketers, A to Z: Part One (1806–1914) (PDF). Cardiff: ACS.
