= Redhill Tunnel =

Railway tunnel in Sussex, England

Coordinates: 51.239°N 0.1615°W

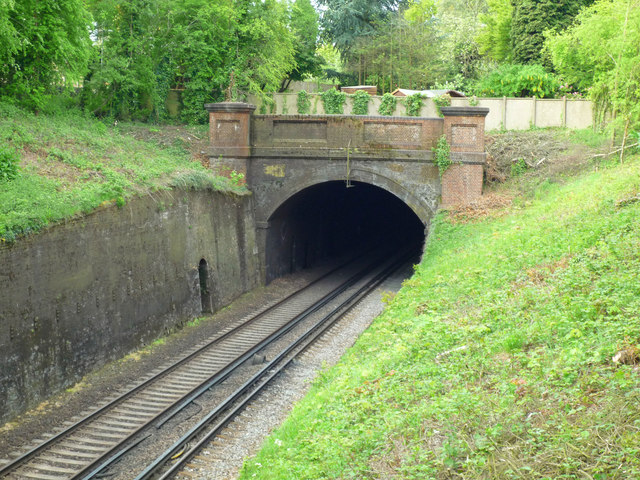
The north portal of Redhill Tunnel

Redhill Tunnel is a railway tunnel passing under the eastern area of Redhill in Surrey, Great Britain. It is on the 'Quarry Line' section of the Brighton Main Line and was constructed in 1899. The tunnel is 502 yards (459 m) in length but abuts on to a covered way under the Redhill to Tonbridge Line and Redhill sidings, giving a total length of 649 yards (593 m). There is another Redhill Tunnel on the Midland Main Line south of Trent Junction.

== History ==
The tunnel was built by the London Brighton and South Coast Railway as part of their line 'Quarry Line' designed to avoid the rail bottleneck at Redhill railway station. Plans were drawn up by Charles L. Morgan, the Chief Engineer of the company. Authority for the new line was granted by the British Parliament in July 1896, and construction took place during 1898-9. The tunnel was opened on 8 November 1899 (1 April 1900 for passenger traffic). The lines through the tunnel were electrified in 1932 by the Southern Railway.

A disaster in the tunnel was narrowly avoided in April 1918, when a munitions train carrying high explosives ran into some derailed wagons inside the tunnel. The entire munitions train was derailed filling a length of the tunnel with explosive debris, but there was no fire. It took forty hours to clear the line.
