= Penshurst Airfield =

Airfield in Leigh, UK

Penshurst Airfield RAF Penshurst

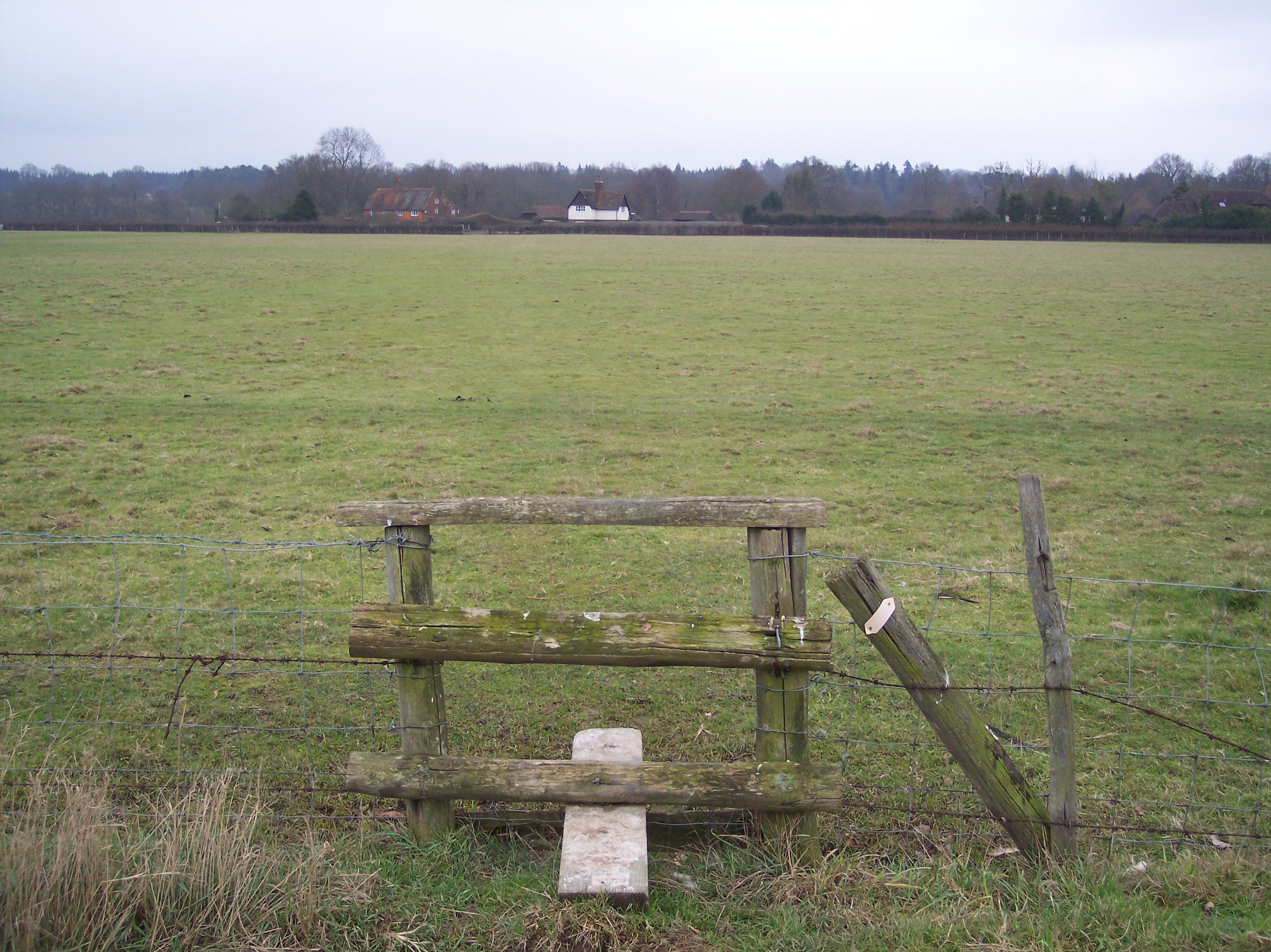
- The site of Penshurst Airfield, February 2010
- IATA: none; ICAO: none

Summary
- Airport type: Closed
- Serves: Penshurst, Kent
- Location: Leigh, Kent
- Built: 1916
- In use: 1916–1936; 1940–1946
- Occupants: 2 Wireless School RFC; 268 Squadron RAF; 653 Squadron RAF; 661 Squadron RAF; 664 Squadron RAF
- Elevation AMSL: 177 ft / 54 m
- Coordinates: 51°12′N 0°11′E

Map
- Location in Kent

Runways
Direction	Length		Surface
Direction	ft	m	Surface
E/W	2,000	610	Grass

Penshurst Airfield was an airfield in operation between 1916–36 and 1940–46. Initially a military airfield, after the First World War it was used as an alternate destination to Croydon Airport, with some civil flying taking place. The airfield closed following the crash of a Flying Flea at an air display in 1936, and was converted to a polo ground.

It re-opened during the Second World War as an Emergency Landing Ground, RAF Penshurst. As well as serving in this role, it was mainly used by air observation post (AOP) squadrons of the Royal Air Force. The airfield finally closed in May 1946.

== Location ==
The airfield was located south of Charcott, on the western edge of Leigh, and eastern edge of Chiddingstone, at 51°12′N 0°11′E (TQ 525 468). The parish boundary running through the site. It was named Penshurst as it was considered that name was more up-market than Chiddingstone Causeway or Leigh. The airfield was some 2 miles (3.2 km) north of Penshurst. Nearby Penshurst railway station lies within the parish of Chiddingstone.

== History ==
=== 1910s ===
An airfield was established at Penshurst in December 1916. The airfield had a grass runway. The site measured 800 yd (730 m) from north to south and 400 yd (370 m) from east to west. In total it extended to 72 acres (29 ha). Facilities included two hangars of 130 ft × 60 ft (40 m × 18 m), and a 2,000 ft (610 m) long grass runway, aligned east–west. A large house, Knotley Hall, which stood to the south of the airfield was requisitioned for use as the officer's accommodation. During 1917, Royal Aircraft Factory B.E.12 aircraft of No. 78 Squadron RFC were based at Penshurst.

On 8 November 1917, No. 2 Wireless School was formed at Penshurst. It operated a variety of aircraft, including Airco DH.6, Avro 504K, Avro 504N, Royal Aircraft Factory B.E.2c and B.E.2e, Sopwith Camel and Sopwith Snipe. Aircrew attended the school for a one-week-long course in wireless telephony procedures. The school was disbanded on 23 March 1919. Knotley Hall was offered for sale in May 1919. In September 1919, it was announced that Penshurst had been disposed of by the Royal Air Force, and that it could be considered as an emergency landing ground for civil aircraft.

=== 1920s ===
In February 1920, a Notice to Airmen was issued advising pilots that had made emergency landings at Penshurst that they could use the War Office telephone to inform the police of their arrival and to obtain conveyances for their passengers to take them to Penshurst station. On 5 June 1920, the first air mail flight between the Netherlands and the United Kingdom was made. Bert Hinchcliffe departed from Schiphol in a hired Airco DH.9 with 300 letters on board. Despite the bad weather, Hinchcliffe decided not to land at Lympne and pressed on towards Croydon. He was eventually forced to land at Penshurst due to a combination of the weather and running low on fuel. A taxi was hired to take Hinchcliffe and the letters on to London. A linen windsock was installed at Penshurst in November 1920. The War Office telephone was notified as having been discontinued in January 1921. On 24 September 1921, a de Havilland DH.18 aircraft diverted to Penshurst as Croydon was fogbound.

From February 1922 the airfield, which was in use as an emergency landing ground, had an illuminated T as part of the illumination of the London-Paris airway. Also at the airfield were coloured lamps connected to an anemometer to indicate wind strength, green for no wind, white for moderate wind and red to indicate strong wind.

On 10 June 1922, Alan Cobham was forced to land his de Havilland DH.9 at Penshurst owing to poor weather conditions at Stag Lane Aerodrome, Edgware. He was attempting a 1,200 mi (1,900 km) flight from Belgrade, Yugoslavia bringing photographs of the Royal Wedding between King Alexander and Princess Maria for publication by the Daily Mirror. The photographs were taken on to London by road. On 7 July 1922, two Farman Goliaths diverted to Penshurst during a gale. One aircraft belonged to Compagnie des Messageries Aériennes and the other to Compagnie des Grands Express Aériens. Both aircraft were picketed overnight as there was no hangar large enough to accommodate them. A gust of 65 mph (105 km/h) was recorded.

In 1925, runway lights were installed at Penshurst. In 1926, a telephone was again made available to airmen at Penshurst. On 27 August 1927, Tunbridge Wells Air Pageant was held. The site originally chosen, a field about a mile outside Tunbridge Wells was deemed unsuitable as there were obstacles surrounding it. It was decided to continue the pageant at Penshurst. Five civil de Havilland Moths and three Armstrong Whitworth Siskins from No. 56 Squadron RAF, based at nearby RAF Biggin Hill attended. The pageant was to promote the proposed Tunbridge Wells Flying Club, whose President was to be Sir Robert Gower. It was reported that part of Penshurst Airfield had been rented by the club. Sir Robert entertained Sir Sefton Brancker at Penshurst on 5 December 1927 when Brancker called in on his way to Lympne Aerodrome where he was to visit the East Kent Flying Club.

=== 1930s ===
In 1930, Home Counties Aircraft Services were based at Penshurst. A de Havilland DH.60 Gipsy Moth was exhibited at a car showroom in Tunbridge Wells, causing severe traffic congestion due to the number of people visiting the town to see it. Home Counties Aircraft Service Ltd was registered later that year. By October 1930, Mr Waters, the manager of Home Counties Aircraft Service Ltd had formed the Surrey Aero Club, based at Gatwick Racecourse Aerodrome.

The airfield served as an alternative destination for Imperial Airways when Croydon was fogbound. The runway was just long enough for this purpose. Using Penshurst as an alternate destination caused delays to the passengers as there were no Customs facilities. On 18 February 1932, Croydon and Penshurst were both fogbound, and Handley Page H.P.45 G-AAXE Hengist diverted to Heston Aerodrome. As Customs facilities existed there, passengers were on their way in 10 minutes, as opposed to the three hour or longer delay when using Penshurst. The practice of having a Customs Officer attend Penshurst on a daily basis was instigated, but it was discontinued in February 1935. On 24 October 1932, a German and a French airliner diverted to Penshurst due to smog over London.

By 1933, Penshurst was being operated by Air Travel Ltd, who were agents for Brooklands Airways. In 1935, Air Travel Ltd were employing 25 staff. On 1 March 15 aircraft and 26 engines were being worked upon. Air Travel Ltd increased its capital from £500 to £7,000 in January 1936. In that year, Penshurst marked the south eastern corner of Croydon's controlled zone which came into effect during conditions of bad visibility.

On 22 July 1936, Charles Lindbergh departed Penshurst for Staaken Airfield, Berlin, which was a Luftwaffe airfield closed to civil aircraft. Lindbergh had been invited to Berlin by Hermann Göring. A press blackout was imposed on the orders of Adolf Hitler. Lindbergh made a speech to the Aero Club in Berlin which was reported in the Völkischer Beobachter.

As a result of the expiry of the lease on the land, Penshurst Airfield closed on 28 July 1936. Air Travel Ltd moved to Gatwick. In 1938, the land was converted for use as a Polo ground by the Eridge Polo Club. Civil aircraft that were based at Penshurst include the Avro Avian III, Avro Avian IVM, Avro 504K and Avro 504N, de Havilland DH.60 Moth (various models), and Spartan Three-Seater.

=== From 1940 ===
Fw Schieverhofer's Messerschmitt Bf 109E, which crash landed at RAF Penshurst on 27 October 1940.

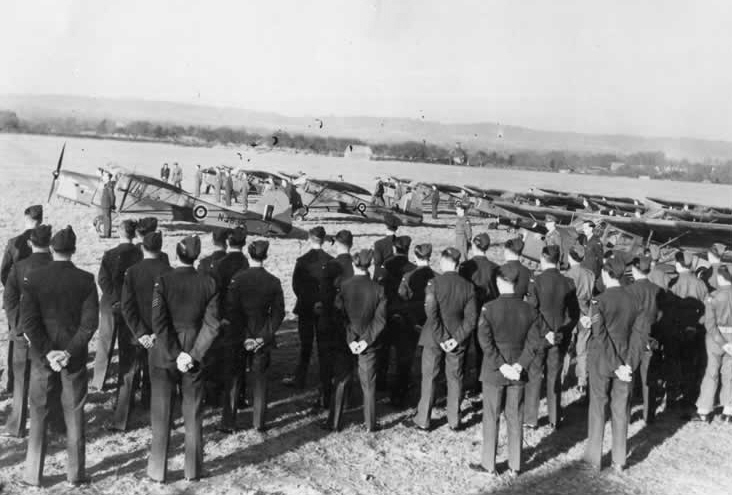
Members of 653 Squadron at RAF Penshurst on the occasion of the presentation of an Auster in memory of Bertram Dickson, 13 January 1944

Boeing B-17 Flying Fortress 43-37527 N7-X The Prowler after it had landed at RAF Penshurst on 6 July 1944.

In 1940, the airfield was occupied by the Royal Air Force, who erected Nissen huts and cleared the area of obstacles as it was intended to use the area as an Emergency Landing Ground. Three pillboxes were erected around the airfield's perimeter. Between March and June 1940 the airfield was used by No. 15 Elementary Flying Training School at RAF Redhill as a relief landing ground. Knotley Hall was again requisitioned for use as the officers' quarters, although the tennis courts were off-limits.

During the Battle of Britain, on 27 October 1940, a Messerschmitt Bf 109E flown by Fw Lothar Schieverhofer, of 3 Gruppe, Jagdgeschwader 52, was damaged in a dogfight with Supermarine Spitfire IIa P7494 of No. 74 Squadron RAF, flown by Plt Off Peter Chesters. The Messerschmitt made a wheels-up landing at RAF Penshurst, where Chesters also landed a few minutes later as he was short of fuel. Chesters dragged the German from his aircraft. Schieverhofer spat in his face, and a fist-fight developed with both combatants swearing at each other in German. The fight was broken up by the arrival of an ARP Warden, a policeman and a soldier. Chesters was forced to hand back Schieverhofer's Iron Cross, which he had snatched as a souvenir, and instead took the first aid kit from the Messerschmitt. Schieverhofer was taken away from RAF Penshurst as a prisoner of war.

On 4 August 1941 No. 268 Squadron RAF were deployed to RAF Penshurst from RAF Snailwell. They were based here for four days before they returned to RAF Snailwell on 8 August. At the time, 268 Squadron were operating the Curtiss Tomahawk IIA. On 7 September 1942, No. 653 Squadron RAF was deployed to RAF Penshurst, bringing their Auster AOP.5 aircraft with them. The squadron departed on 17 August 1943 but returned again on 17 September. On 13 January 1944, an Auster was presented to 653 Squadron in memory of Scottish aviation pioneer Bertram Dickson. Another was presented to the squadron that day by a Mrs Law in memory of her son. 653 Squadron departed Penshurst on 27 June 1944. LB264, one of 653 Squadron's Austers which operated from RAF Penshurst, is preserved at the Royal Air Force Museum, Hendon. On 27 June 1944, 653 Squadron relocated to Normandy. Another Auster squadron, No. 661 Squadron, moved into Penshurst the day 653 Squadron left, like 653 Squadron, 661 followed them to France on 7 August 1944.

On 6 July 1944, Boeing B-17 Flying Fortress 43–37527 N7-X The Prowler of the 603d Bombardment Squadron, USAAF made an emergency wheels-up landing at RAF Penshurst. The aircraft was returning to RAF Nuthampstead from a raid on Saint-Omer, France. Eight of the eleven crew bailed out before the aircraft landed. Although a Leigh resident recalled that the aircraft was later repaired and flown out at a light load and taking advantage of favourable winds, official records show that the aircraft was written off. In December 1944, personnel based at Penshurst numbered 26 officers and 166 other ranks. On 2 February 1945, No. 664 Squadron RAF was deployed to Penshurst. They also flew Austers. On 23 March 1945, 664 Squadron were transferred to the Netherlands. On 10 July 1945 Douglas C-47A Dakota 42-108872 of the 23d Fighter Squadron USAAF crashed on landing at RAF Penshurst. The aircraft was written off. RAF Penshurst closed on 13 May 1946, the site was also used by No. 2733 Squadron RAF Regiment. The control tower was demolished in the 1970s. The crewroom was demolished in 1990. A hangar survived until 1991, when it blew down in a storm.

== Civil accidents and incidents ==
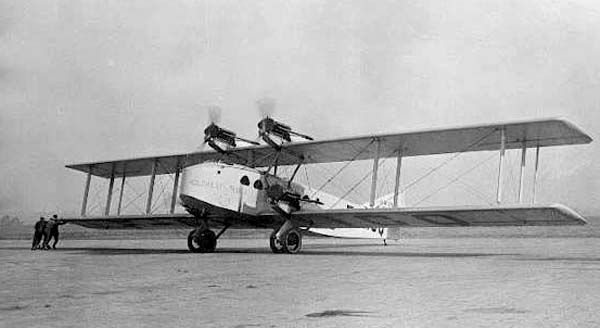
Blériot 155 F-AICQ Clement Ader, which crashed on 2 October 1926 while trying to land at Penshurst

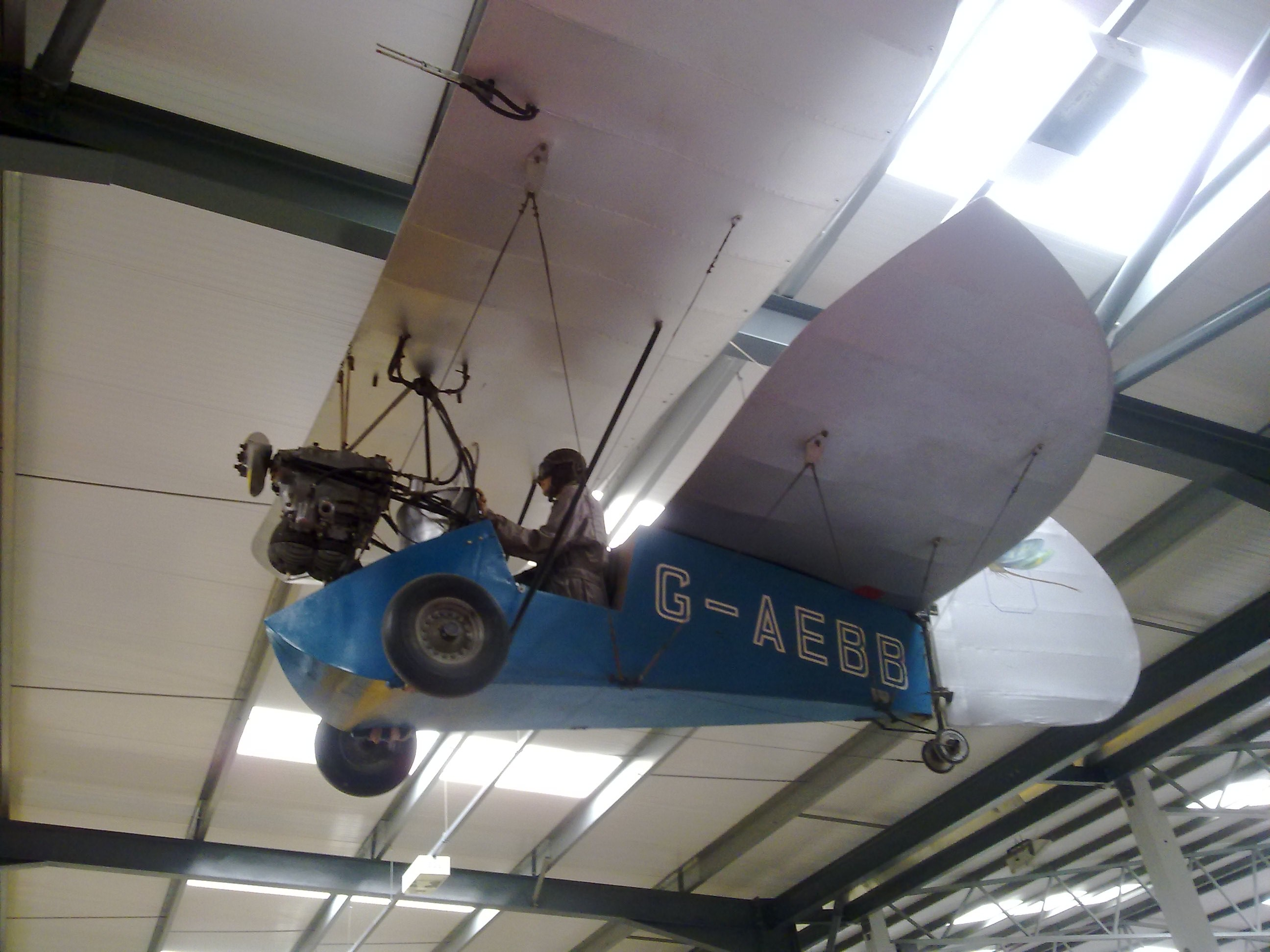
A Flying Flea, similar to G-AEEW which crashed in 1936

- On 20 August 1922, an aircraft flown by Thomas Baden Powell of Tunbridge Wells on a flight from Croydon crashed on landing at Penshurst. Baden Powell was subsequently convicted of flying an unregistered aircraft and flying without a valid pilot's licence. He was fined £40.

On 2 October 1926, Blériot 155 F-AICQ Clement Ader of Air Union crashed at Southwood, Leigh following an in-flight fire, killing all seven people on board. The pilot was trying to make an emergency landing at Penshurst. This was the first in-flight fire on a civil airliner. The Coroner recorded a verdict of "accidental death" against all seven victims.

- On 2 May 1930, Farman F.63 Goliath F-ADCA of Air Union crashed in Penshurst after encountering a heavy squall during a flight from Le Bourget to Croydon.
- On 4 May 1936, Mignet HM.14 "Flying Flea" G-AEEW crashed at an airshow held at Penshurst, killing the pilot. As a result of this accident, Air Commodore Chamier, secretary of the Air League, called for the Flying Flea to be grounded pending an enquiry.

== Bibliography ==
- Delve, Ken (2005). The Military Airfields of Britain. Southern England: Kent, Hampshire, Surrey and Sussex. Ramsbury: The Crowood Press Ltd. ISBN 1-86126-729-0.
- Humphreys, Roy (2001). Kent Aviation, A Century of Flight. Stroud: Sutton Publishing. ISBN 0-7509-2790-9.
- Jackson, A.J. (1973). British Civil Aircraft since 1919 Volume 1. London: Putnam. ISBN 0-370-10006-9.
- Jefford, C.G. (1988). RAF Squadrons. Airlife Publishing Ltd. ISBN 1-85310-053-6.
- Sturtivant, Ray (2007). RAF Flying Training and Support Units since 1912. Air-Britain. ISBN 978-0-85130-365-9.
