= Penshurst railway station =

Railway station in Kent, England

Penshurst
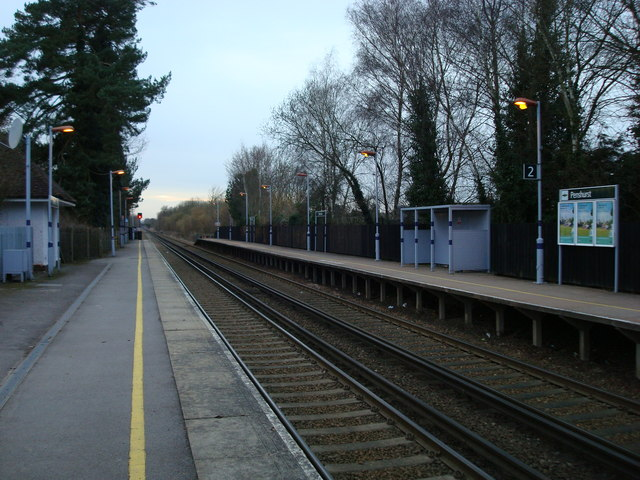

General information
- Location: Penshurst, Sevenoaks; England
- Coordinates: 51.197°N 0.173°E
- Grid reference: TQ519464
- Manager: Southern
- Platforms: 2

Other information
- Station code: PHR
- Classification: DfT category F1

History
- Original company: South Eastern Railway
- Pre-grouping: South Eastern and Chatham Railway
- Post-grouping: Southern Railway

Key dates
- 26 May 1842: Opened

Passengers
- 2021/22: ▲39,256
- 2022/23: ▲40,710
- 2023/24: ▲43,600
- 2024/25: ▲46,678
- 2025/26: ▲47,870
Location
Notes
- Passenger statistics from the Office of Rail and Road

Penshurst railway station is on the Redhill to Tonbridge Line and is located approximately two miles north of Penshurst in Kent, in the village of Chiddingstone Causeway in England. It is 38 miles 3 chains (38.04 miles, 61.22 km) measured from London Charing Cross via Redhill.

== History ==
Penshurst station was opened by the South Eastern Railway on 26 May 1842. Penshurst Airfield, which was in operation from 1916 to 1936, and again from 1940 to 1946 as RAF Penshurst, was within 1/4 mile (400 m) of the station.

In 1967 the station became unstaffed following which the original station buildings were demolished. In 1993 the line was electrified and services started to run through to London rather than being an extension of the Reading to Tonbridge North Downs Line service. Prior to electrification a new down platform was constructed opposite the up platform. New signalling was installed when the signal box was closed.

In 2007, a PERTIS (Permit to Travel) machine was installed at the street entrance to the Tonbridge-bound platform (since replaced by a modern ticket machine). The station was until December 2008 operated by Southeastern before it transferred to Southern, whose green signage was installed before October 2008.

== Facilities and Connections ==
Penshurst station is unstaffed and facilities are limited. Tickets can be purchased from the self-service ticket machine at the station and there are passenger help points located on each platforms. There is also a basic shelter with covered seating located on each platform. The station has step free access available to both platforms.

The station is served Monday-Saturday by the Metrobus routes 231 & 233 buses which provide connections to Edenbridge and Tunbridge Wells as well as the Autocar route 210 which provides connections to Tonbridge.

== Accidents and incidents ==
- On 28 July 1845, a light engine was in a rear-end collision with a passenger train near Penshurst. Thirty people were injured.
- On 20 January 1846, a bridge over the River Medway between Tonbridge and Penshurst collapsed whilst a freight train was passing over it. The driver was killed.

== Services ==
All services at Penshurst are operated by Southern using Class 377 EMUs.

The typical off-peak service is one train per hour in each direction between Redhill and Tonbridge. A small number of additional services call at the station during the peak hours.

Preceding station	National Rail	Following station
Edenbridge	Southern Redhill to Tonbridge Line	Leigh

== Future Plans ==
In early 2024 Network Rail created a research paper looking into options to increase rail use between Kent and Gatwick Airport. Five options are being looked are:

1. Tonbridge - Redhill - Gatwick Airport 1tph (all day) + Tonbridge - Redhill 1tph (peak only)
2. Tonbridge - Redhill - Gatwick Airport 2tph (all day)
3. Tonbridge - Redhill - Gatwick Airport 1tph (all day) + Tonbridge - Redhill 1tph (all day)
4. Maidstone West - Redhill - Gatwick Airport 1tph fast (all day) + Tonbridge - Redhill 1tph (all day)
5. Ashford International - Redhill - Gatwick Airport 1tph fast (all day) + Tonbridge - Redhill 1tph (all day)
