= John Duke =

John Duke may refer to:

- Sir John Duke, 2nd Baronet (1632–1705), English member of parliament and landowner
- John Duke (Honiton MP) (1717–1775), English member of parliament and landowner
- John Duke (cricketer) (1830–1890), English cricketer and cricket ball manufacturer
- John Woods Duke (1899–1984), American composer and pianist
- John Duke (police officer) (1926–1989), British police officer

== See also ==
- Johnny Duke (1924–2006), American boxer and coach
- John Doak (disambiguation)
