= Godstone railway station =

Railway station in Surrey, England

Godstone
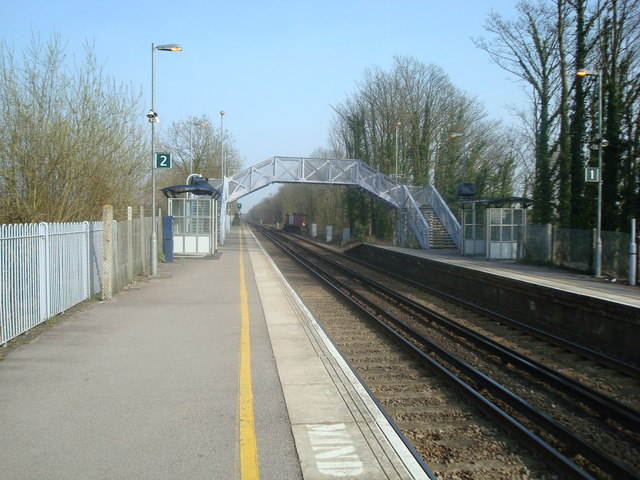

General information
- Location: Godstone, Tandridge; England
- Coordinates: 51°13′05″N 0°03′00″W
- Grid reference: TQ362483
- Manager: Southern
- Platforms: 2

Other information
- Station code: GDN
- Classification: DfT category F2

Key dates
- 26 May 1842: Opened

Passengers
- 2020/21: ▼20,618
- 2021/22: ▲56,166
- 2022/23: ▲64,010
- 2023/24: ▼62,764
- 2024/25: ▲67,778
Location
Notes
- Passenger statistics from the Office of Rail and Road

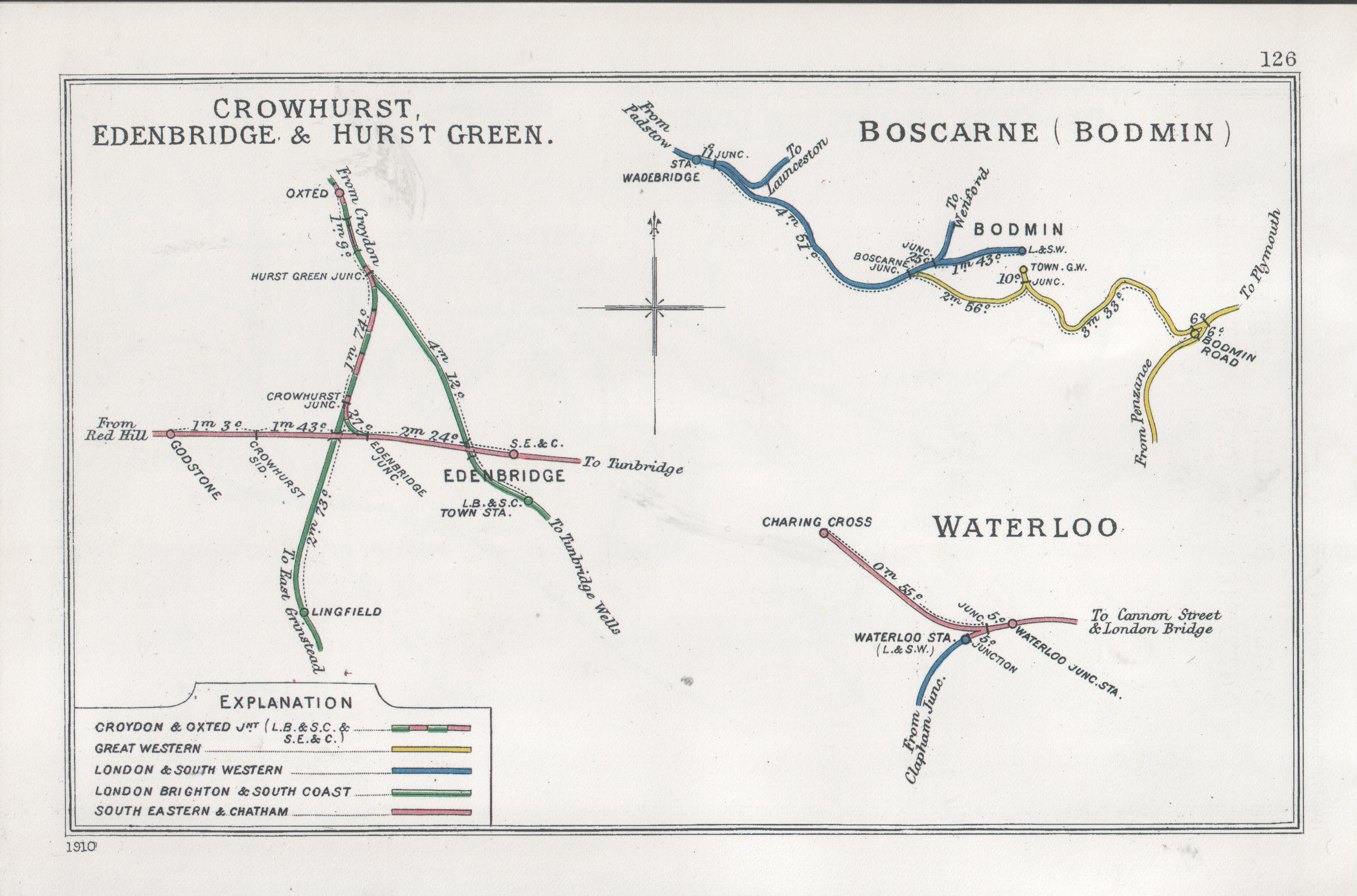
A 1910 Railway Clearing House map of lines around Godstone railway station.

Godstone railway station is on the Redhill to Tonbridge Line and serves Godstone in Surrey, England (over 2 miles away). It is 28 miles 13 chains (28.16 miles, 45.32 km) measured from London Charing Cross via Redhill. The Bletchingley Tunnel (grid reference TQ340486), is less than one mile due west of the station is about ½ mile long.

== History ==
The station was opened in 1842 by the South Eastern Railway.

The station became unstaffed in 1967 following which the original station buildings were demolished and replaced with small shelters.

In 1993 the line was electrified and services started to run through to London rather than being an extension of the Reading to Tonbridge North Downs Line service.

In 2007, a PERTIS machine was installed at the street entrance to the Tonbridge-bound platform. The station was until December 2008 operated by Southeastern before the Department for Transport approved the transfer suggested by Southern to its operations, whose green signage was installed before October 2008.

In 2018 direct services to/from London were cut, with a Redhill - Tonbridge shuttle service operating instead.

== Facilities ==
The station is unstaffed and there is a self-service ticket machine available as well as information screens and help points for train information. Step-free access is available to the Tonbridge bound platform only at the station.

There is a small free car park and bicycle storage is available at the station.

== Services ==
All services at Godstone are operated by Southern using Class 377 EMUs.

The typical off-peak service is one train per hour in each direction between Redhill and Tonbridge. A small number of additional services call at the station during the peak hours.

Preceding station	National Rail	Following station
Nutfield	Southern Redhill to Tonbridge Line	Edenbridge

== Future Plans ==
In early 2024 Network Rail created a research paper looking into options to increase rail use between Kent and Gatwick Airport. Five options are being looked at:

1. Tonbridge - Redhill - Gatwick Airport 1tph (all day) + Tonbridge - Redhill 1tph (peak only)
2. Tonbridge - Redhill - Gatwick Airport 2tph (all day)
3. Tonbridge - Redhill - Gatwick Airport 1tph (all day) + Tonbridge - Redhill 1tph (all day)
4. Maidstone West - Redhill - Gatwick Airport 1tph fast (all day) + Tonbridge - Redhill 1tph (all day)
5. Ashford International - Redhill - Gatwick Airport 1tph fast (all day) + Tonbridge - Redhill 1tph (all day)

== Connections ==
Metrobus route 409 serves the station providing connections to Selsdon, Caterham and East Grinstead.
