= Chiddingstone Causeway =

Village in Kent, England

Coordinates: 51.197500°N 0.174450°E

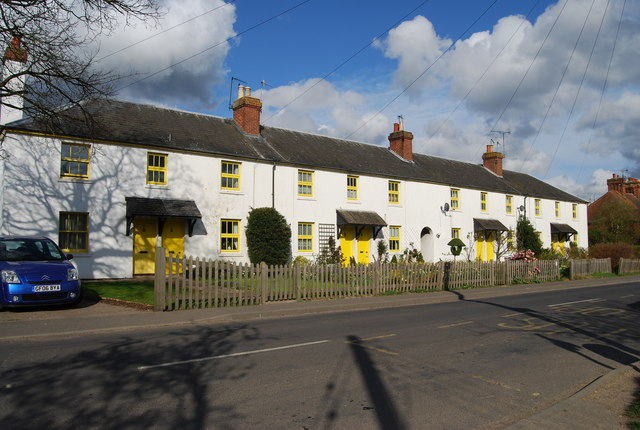
- Cottages in Chiddingstone Causeway

- Location within Kent
- Civil parish: Chiddingstone
- District: Sevenoaks
- Shire county: Kent
- Region: South East
- Country: England
- Sovereign state: United Kingdom
- Post town: Tonbridge
- Postcode district: TN11
- Police: Kent
- Fire: Kent
- Ambulance: South East Coast
- UK Parliament: Tonbridge

- Commonwealth War Graves Commission
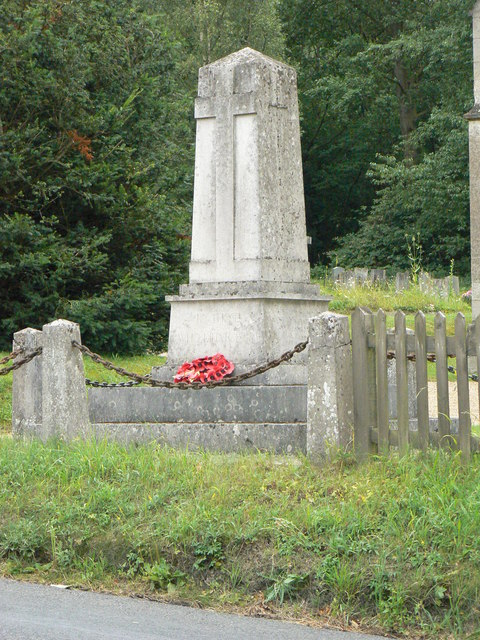
- Used for those deceased
- Unveiled: 30 July 1922
- Location: near Chiddingstone Causeway
- Designed by: Professor Abercrombie

Burials by war
- First World War
- TO THOSE/ WHO DIED FOR US

Chiddingstone Causeway is a village 4 miles (6 km) west of Tonbridge in Kent, England. It is in the civil parish of Chiddingstone and the local government district of Sevenoaks.

The village is served by Penshurst Station on the Redhill to Tonbridge Line with trains running hourly between Redhill and Tonbridge. Penshurst Airfield, which was in operation from 1916 to 1936, and again from 1940 to 1946 as RAF Penshurst, was within ¼ mile (400 m) of the station.

The village is also served by the 231 and 233 bus routes linking Lingfield, Edenbridge, and Tunbridge Wells via Bidborough. The current service contract is run by Metrobus and there is no Sunday or Bank Holiday service. The 210 bus route also serves the village, but with slightly less frequent service. This route links the village to the nearby town of Tonbridge

In the centre of the village is 'The Little Brown Jug' public house.

St. Luke's church is a Church of England church on the Tonbridge Road, just over a hundred metres east of the pub. The area was a centre of the Wealden ironworking industry.

There is a war memorial outside St. Luke's church.
