= Eltham =

District of southeast London, England

Coordinates: 51.451°N 0.052°E

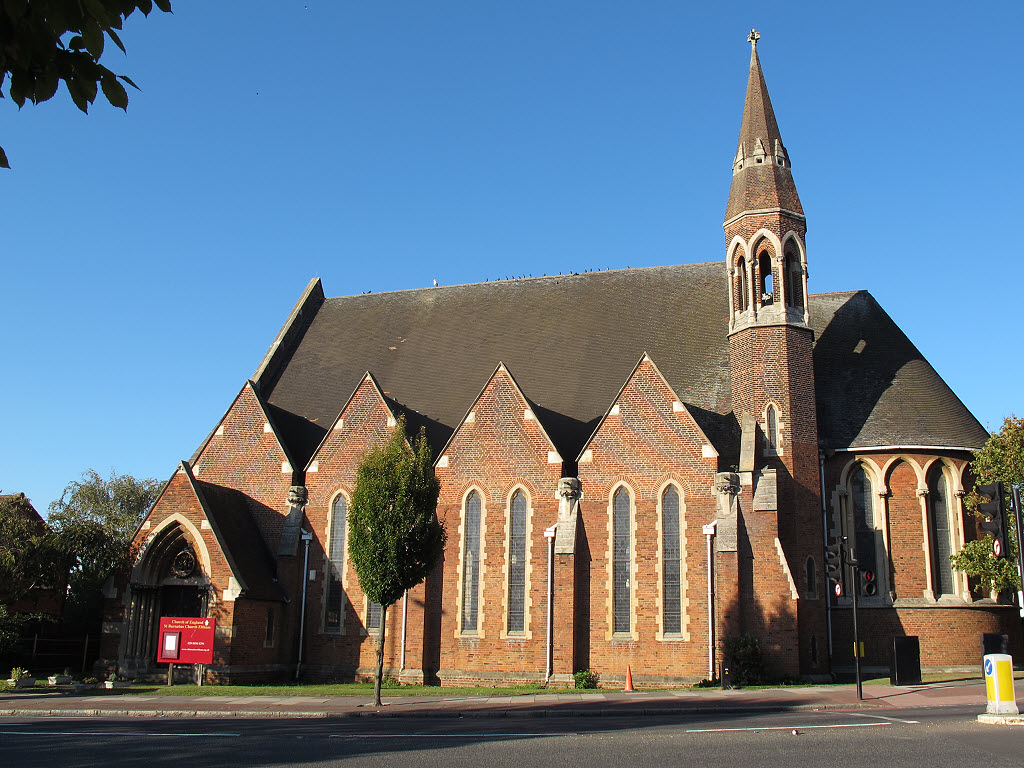
- St Barnabas Church

- Location within Greater London
- Population: 48,964 (2011 Census. 4 Wards. Middle Park and Sutcliffe, Eltham, North, South and West)
- OS grid reference: TQ425745
- London borough: Greenwich
- Ceremonial county: Greater London
- Region: London
- Country: England
- Sovereign state: United Kingdom
- Post town: LONDON
- Postcode district: SE9, SE12 (part)
- Dialling code: 020
- Police: Metropolitan
- Fire: London
- Ambulance: London
- UK Parliament: Eltham and Chislehurst
- London Assembly: Greenwich and Lewisham

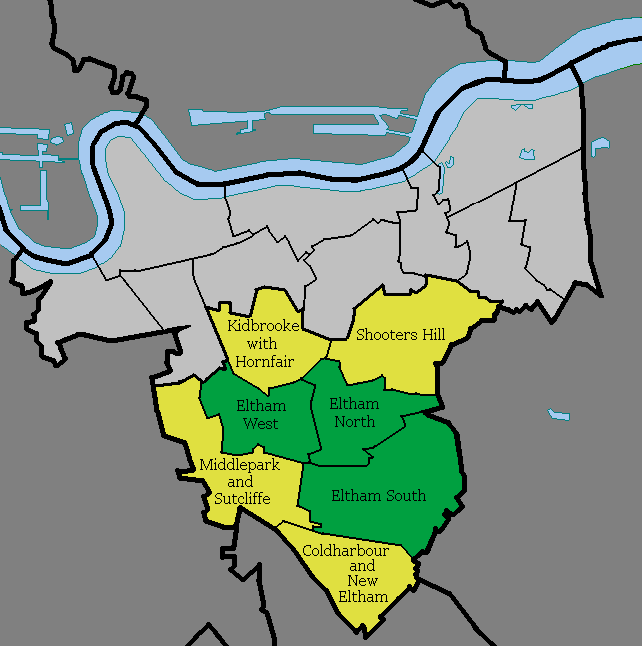
Map 1. The three current Eltham electoral wards (green), in the Eltham constituency (yellow) within the Royal Borough of Greenwich (light grey)

Eltham (/ˈɛltəm/ EL-təm) is a district of southeast London, England, within the Royal Borough of Greenwich. It is 8.7 miles (14.0 km) east-southeast of Charing Cross, and is identified in the London Plan as one of 35 major centres in Greater London. The three wards of Eltham North, South and West have a total population of 35,459. 88,000 people live in Eltham.

== History ==
=== Origins ===
Eltham developed along part of the road from London to Maidstone, and lies 3 miles (4.8 km) almost due south of Woolwich. Mottingham, to the south, became part of the parish on the abolition of all extra-parochial areas, which were rare anomalies in the parish system. Eltham College and other parts of Mottingham were therefore not within Eltham's boundaries, even before the 1860s.

From the sixth century Eltham was in the ancient Lathe of Sutton at Hone. In the Domesday Book of 1086 its hundred was named Gren[u/v]iz (Greenwich), which by 1166 was renamed Blachehedfeld (Blackheath) because it had become the location of the annual or more frequent hundred gathering.

Eltham lies in the hundred of Blackheath, at the distance of eight miles from London, on the road to Maidstone. The parish is bounded by Woolwich, Plumsted, and the extraparochial hamlet of Kidbrooke, on the north; by Bexley on the east and south east; by Chislehurst on the south; by the extraparochial hamlet of Mottingham, on the south-west, and by Lee on the west. It contains about 2,880 acres (11.7 km^{2}): of which about 360 are woodland; about 60 waste; about three fifths of the cultivated land are arable. ....This place had formerly a market on Tuesdays, and two fairs; one at the festival of the Holy Trinity, and the other at that of St. Peter and St. Paul; both of which have been long discontinued.

— Daniel Lysons, 1796, The Environs of London

By the 1880s the lathes and hundreds of Kent had become obsolete, with the civil parishes and other districts assuming modern governmental functions.

Eltham was a civil parish of Kent until 1889 when it became part of the County of London and from 1900 formed part of the Metropolitan Borough of Woolwich. On 31 March 1930 the parish was abolished to form Borough of Woolwich. At the 1921 census (the last before the abolition of the parish), Eltham St John the Baptist had a population of 28,308. The metropolitan borough was abolished in 1965 and Eltham then became part of the then London (now Royal) Borough of Greenwich.

Eltham today is one of the largest suburban developments in the borough with a population of almost 88,000 people.

=== Early development ===
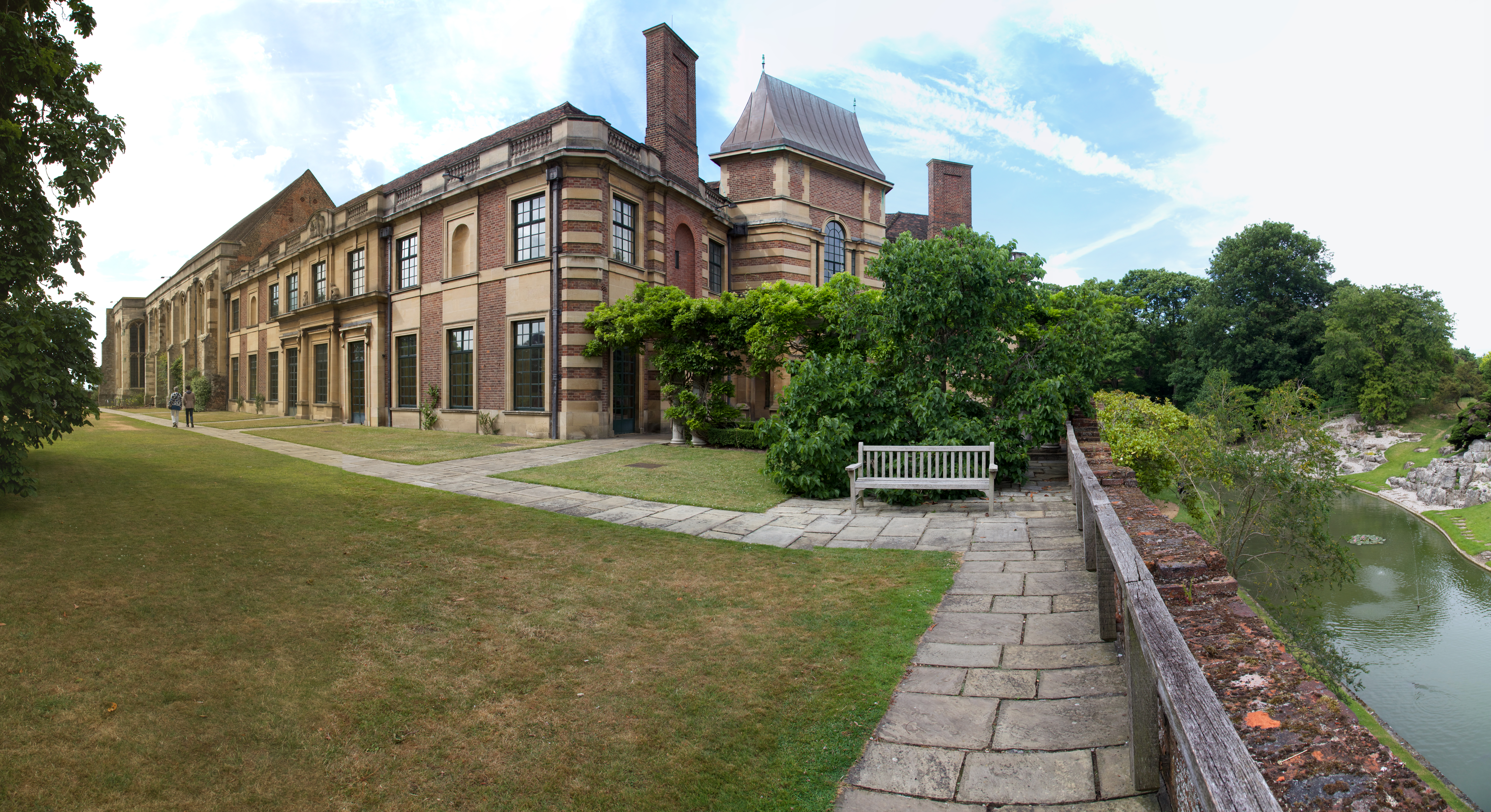
Eltham Palace

Eltham lies on a high, sandy plateau which gave it a strategic significance. That, and the fact of its position close to the main route to the English Channel ports in Kent, led to the creation of the moated medieval Eltham Palace, still its most notable landmark. Daniel Lysons described its origins.

The Kings of England had a palace at Eltham at a very early period ... Henry the Third, in the year 1270, kept a public Christmas at his palace of Eltham, being accompanied by the Queen, and all the great men of the realm. Anthony Bec, Bishop of Durham, and Patriarch of Jerusalem, bestowed great cost, we are told, on the buildings at this place, and died there on the 28th of March 1311, having, as it is said, some time before given Eltham-house to Edward the Second, or, as some say, to Queen Isabel.... Edward frequently resided here. In 1315, his Queen was brought to bed of a son in this palace, called, from that circumstance, John of Eltham. Edward the Third held a Parliament at Eltham in 1329, and again in 1375.

The nearby manor of Well Hall was home to Sir John Pulteney, four times Lord Mayor of London, and later to wealthy Catholic William Roper and his wife Margaret (daughter of Sir Thomas More, known to Catholics as Saint Thomas More, Chancellor to King Henry VIII). In 1733 Sir Gregory Page bought this estate for £19,000 and demolished Roper House, building Page House – later known as Well Hall House – on the site. Until its demolition in 1931, Well Hall House variously served as a home to watchmaker John Arnold, and later to socialist Hubert Bland and author Edith Nesbit.

Also of note is Avery Hill Park and its former mansion, accessed from Bexley Road and at various points along the three miles (5 km) of other streets that surround the park. Avery Hill was the home of Colonel North, who made his fortune working in the Chilean nitrate industry. A hothouse is still open to the public and contains temperate and tropical plants. There are also remnants of the formal gardens in the public park. The mansion was part of the University of Greenwich, which had a significant presence on two sites in the area. However, in 2014 the university announced its intentions to withdraw from the site and has now done so.

=== Suburban development after 1900 ===
The village streets adjacent to the Palace, and the surrounding land, remained rural until Archibald Cameron Corbett bought the Eltham Park Estate and developed it with well-built suburban housing between 1900 and 1914. The Bexley Heath Railway (see below) had opened what came to be known as the Bexleyheath Line in 1895. Suburban development of the district accelerated when the Government, through His Majesty's Office of Works, built the Progress Estate in Well Hall and large estates of temporary hutments in 1915, to house the vastly increased numbers of wartime workers in the Royal Arsenal at Woolwich. In the early years it was called, rather pretentiously, "Well Hall Garden City". Its name was changed to "Progress Estate" when it was purchased by the Royal Arsenal Co-operative Society in 1925. It compares well with later groups of municipal housing in south London – which is surprising given the fact that it was constructed rapidly between February and December 1915 and is sub-divided by the South Circular Road and (until about 1988) by the even busier A2 Trunk Road. The Progress Estate was made a Conservation Area in 2007.

Urban development

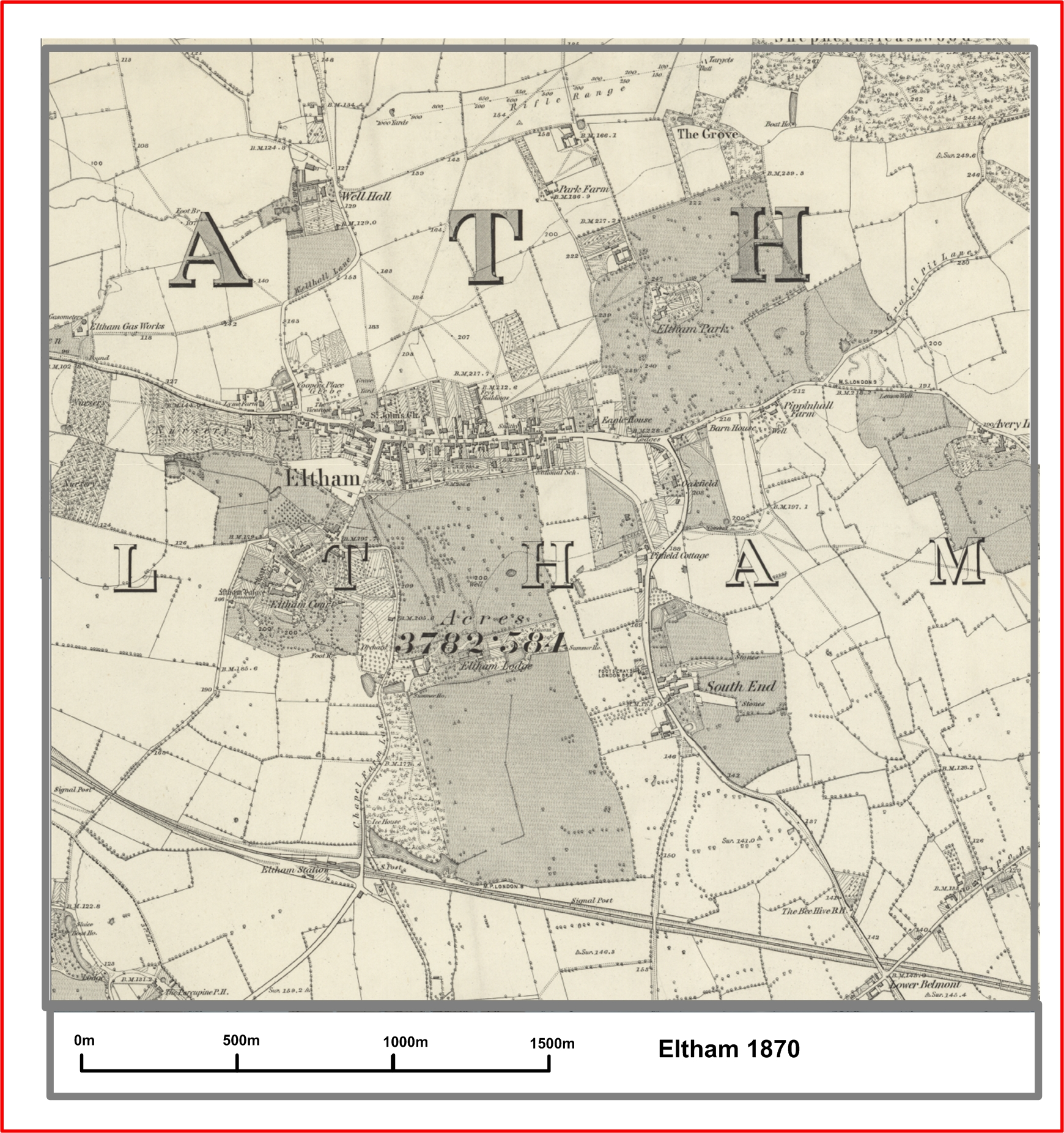
Map 2. Eltham in 1870

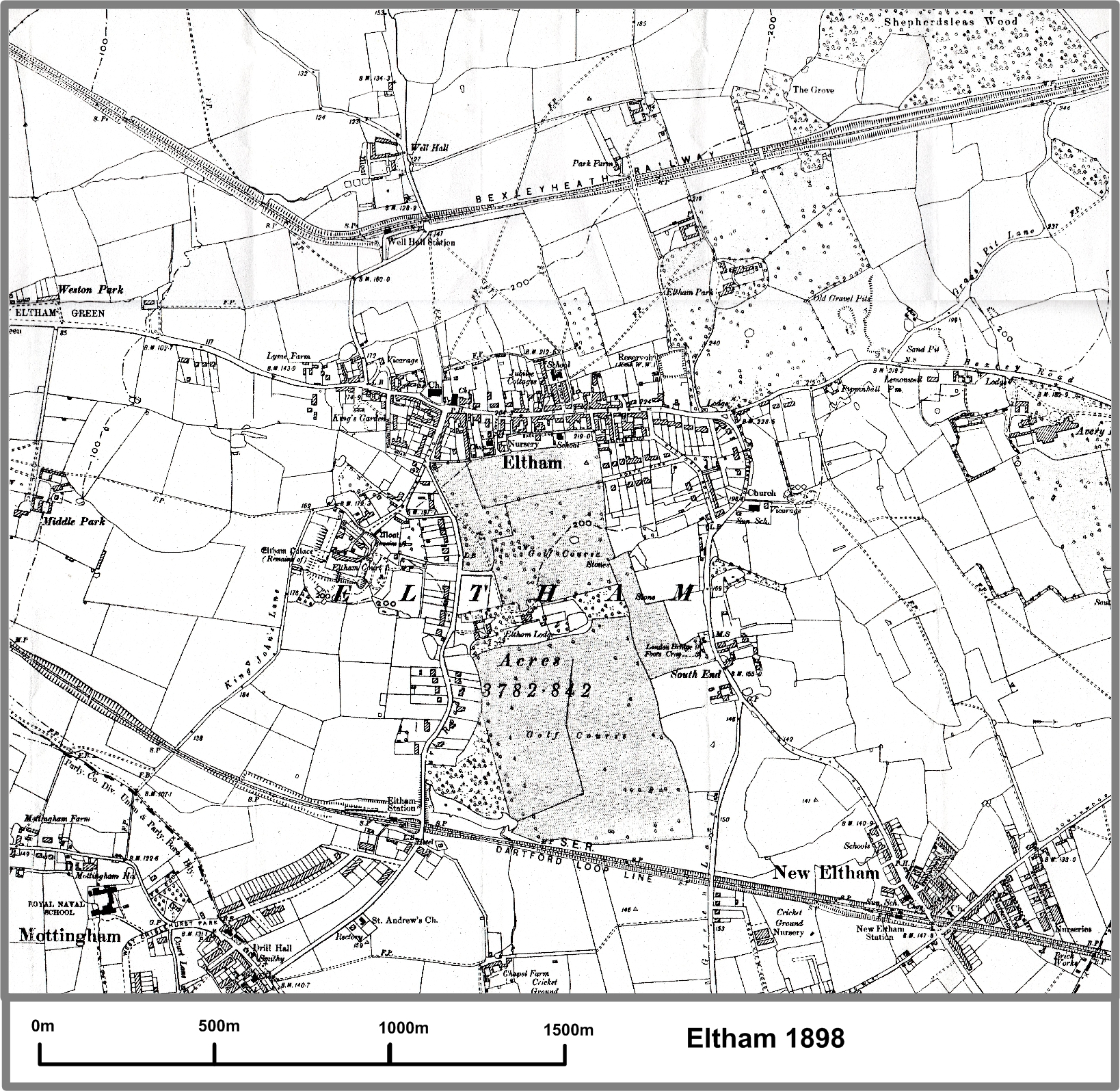
Map 3. Eltham in 1898

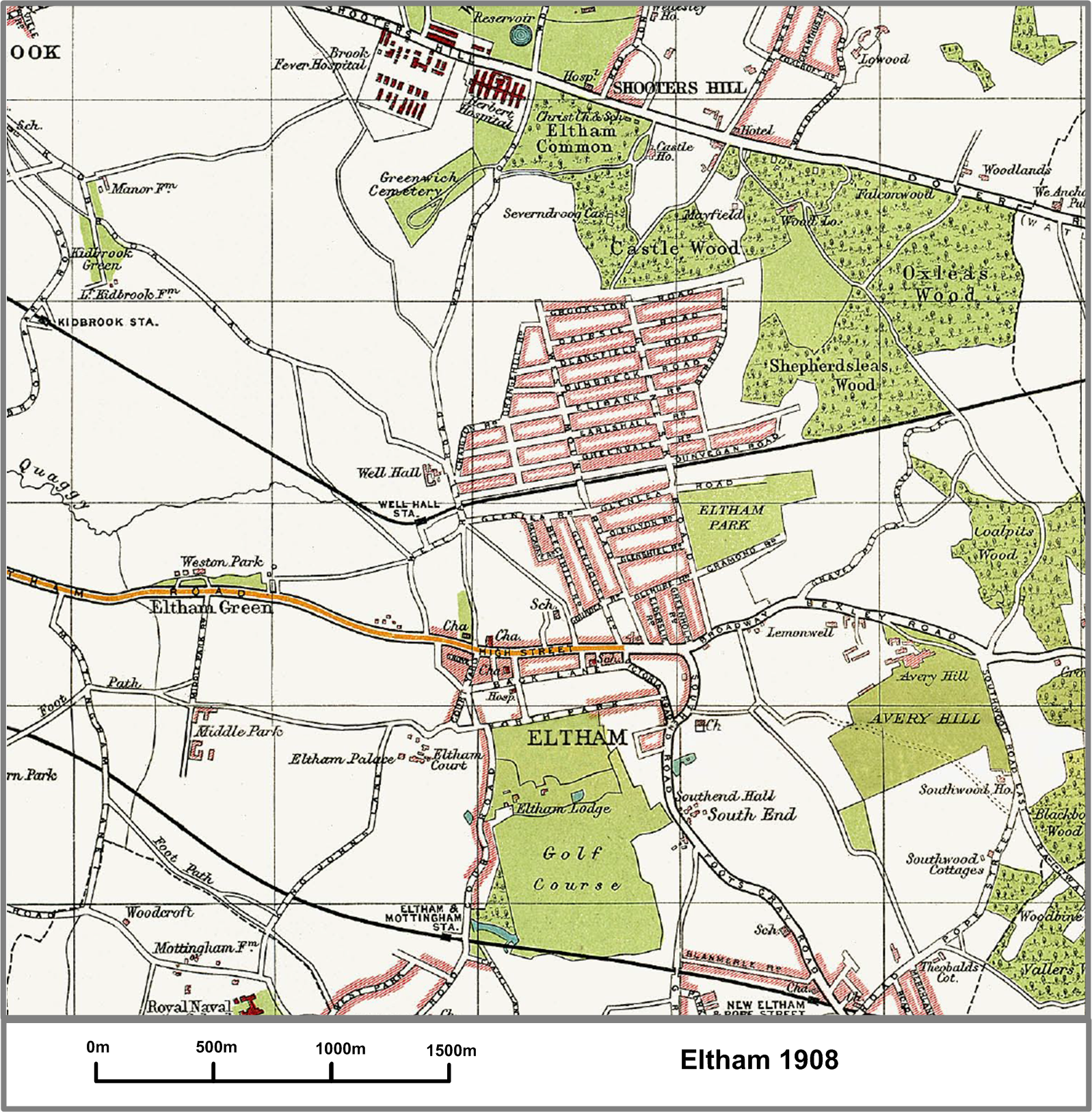
Map 4. Eltham in 1908

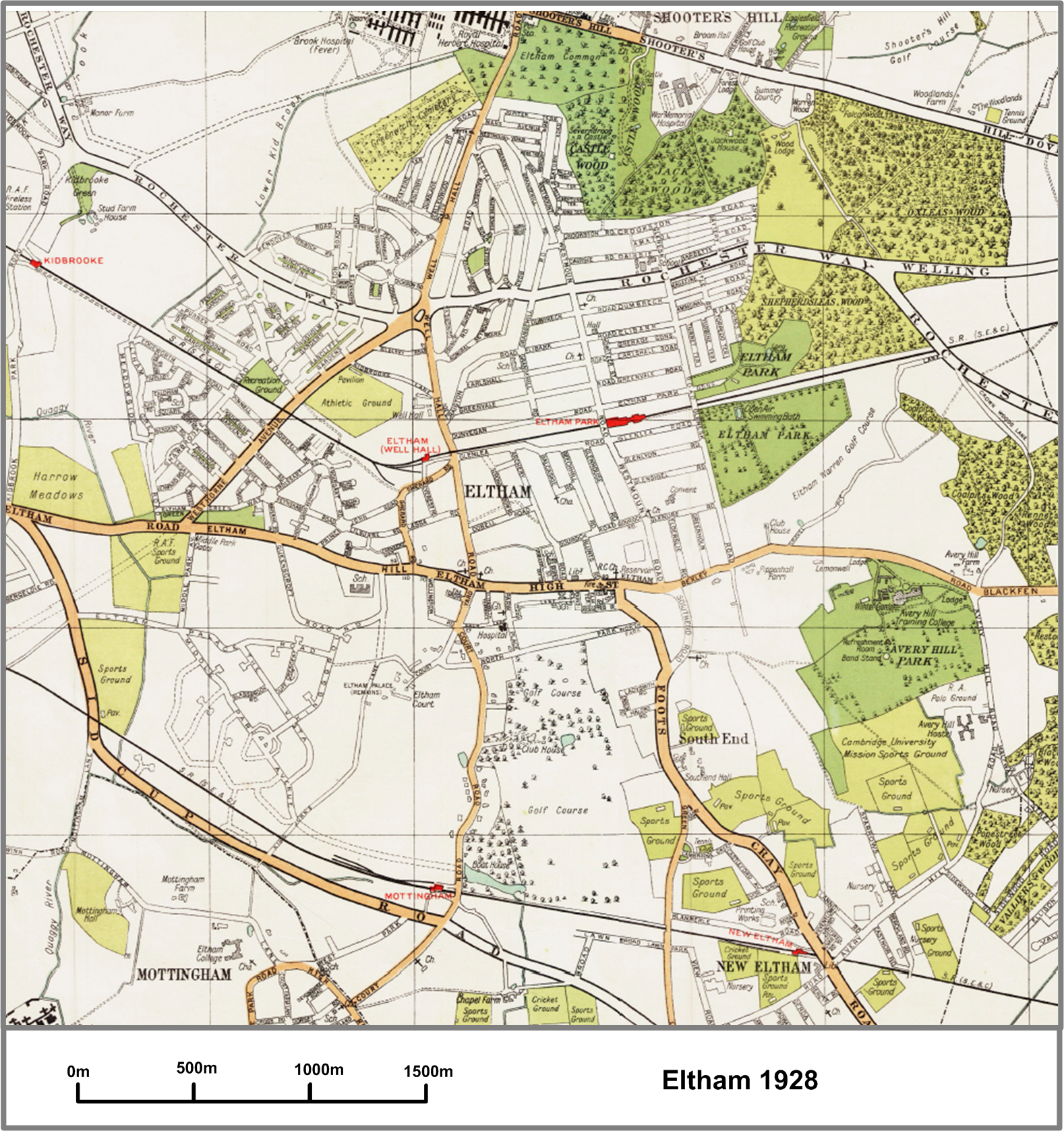
Map 5. Eltham in 1928

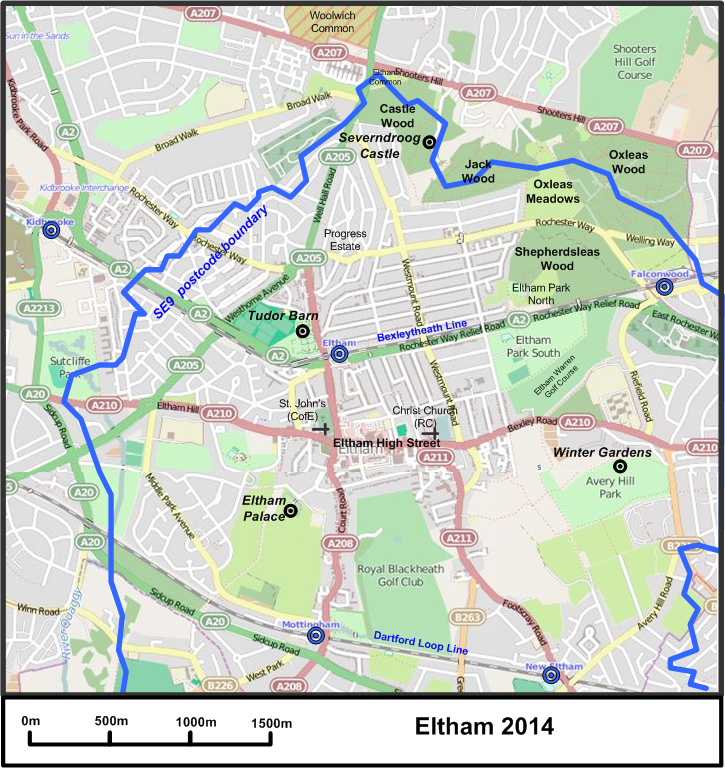
Map 6. Eltham in 2014 (Source: OpenStreetMap)

After World War I the building of housing estates continued unabated. By the beginning of World War II, four large estates were in existence: the Progress Estate (1915), the Page Estate (1923), Middle Park (1931–36), and Horn Park (begun 1936, completed 1950s). The latter two were built on Eltham Palace's former hunting parks. Coldharbour Estate was built in 1947. The small council estates of Pippenhall and Strongbow Crescent were completed about 1960. Since that time new house building has been limited to small private "infill developments" and replacements for demolished properties.

Eltham residents occupy a housing stock of mixed age, particularly towards Eltham Park and the multiple streets with 'Glen' in their names. There are some fine houses scattered around Eltham. At least two roads, North Park and Court Road, contain million pound homes, and some of the older Victorian buildings have been subdivided into apartments.

A Micropub, The Long Pond, was opened in December 2014 - the first pub in Eltham Park for at least 115 years as Archibald Cameron Corbett would not give permission for pubs and put a restrictive covenant on the land. However, since the Licensing Act 2003 was implemented in 2005, Premise Licences are now granted by the local authority (Greenwich London Borough Council) instead of magistrates, as long as the applicant satisfies the council and the "responsible authorities" (such as Police, Environmental Health, Fire Service) that they will uphold the four licensing objectives (prevention of crime and disorder; public safety; prevention of public nuisance, protection of children from harm), then a licence will be granted. Several licensed premises in Eltham Park now offer "Off Sales".

Domestic architecture

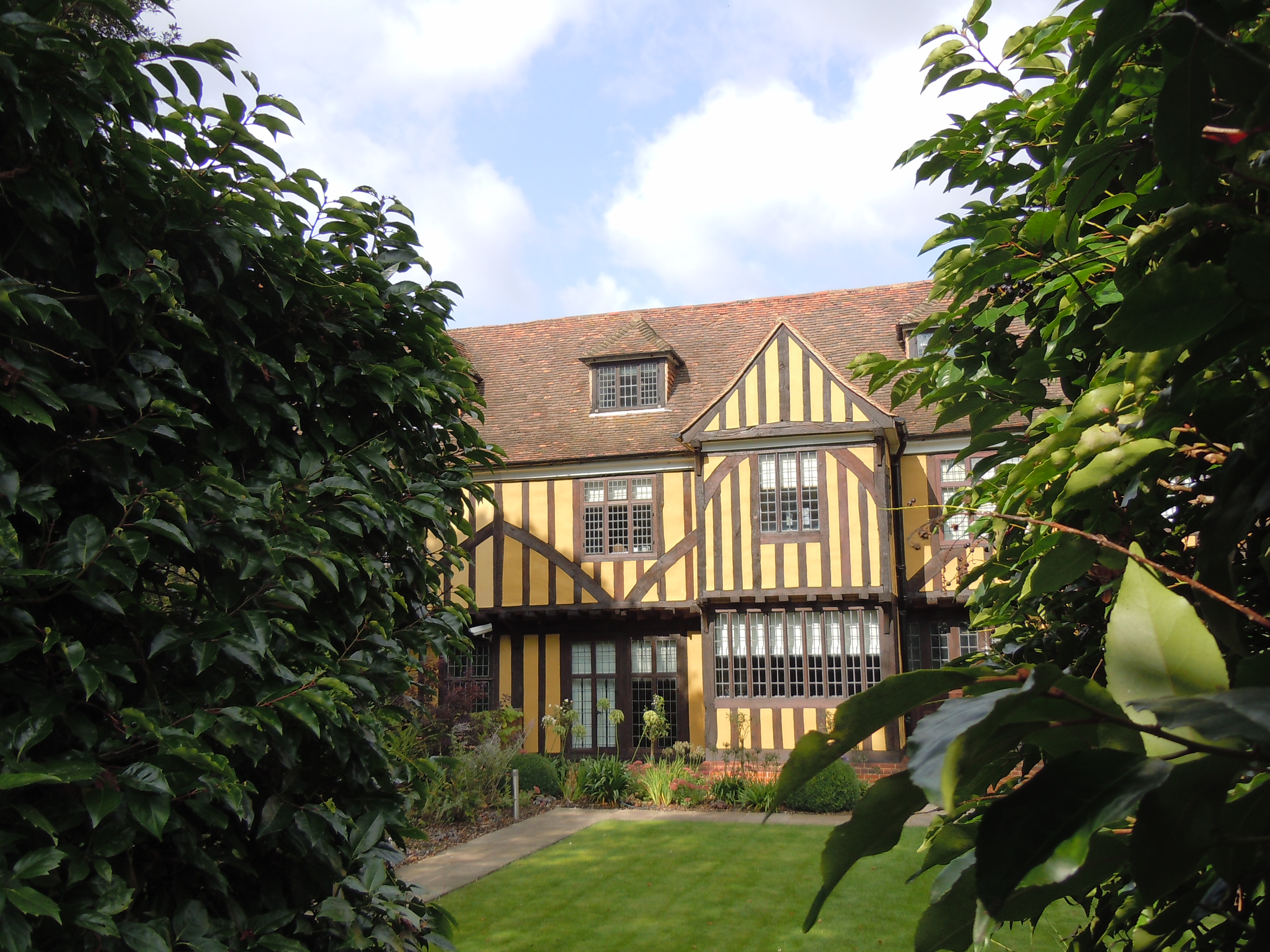
The Lord Chancellor's Lodging c. 1420

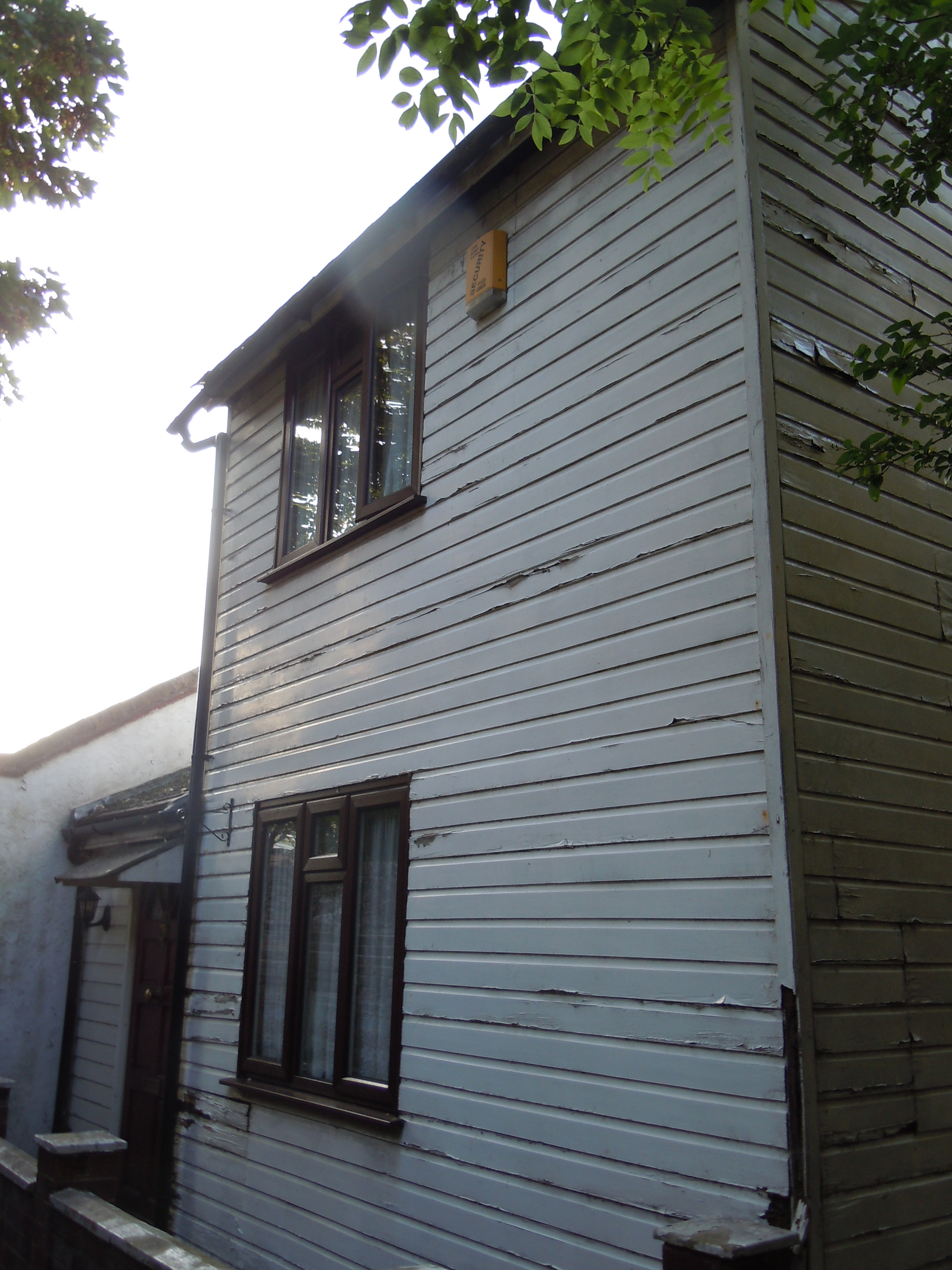
Clapboard cottage c. 1750

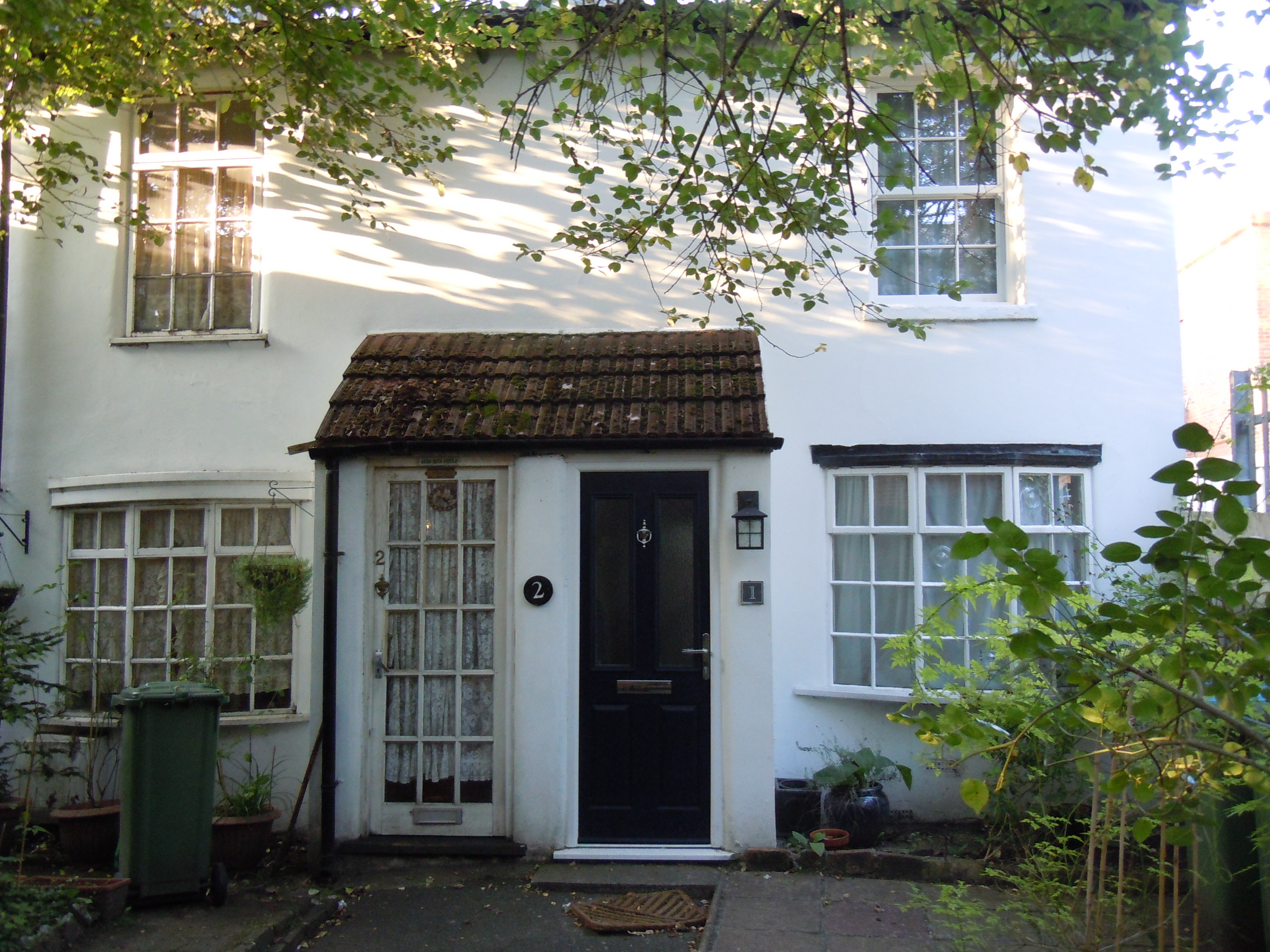
Pair of cottages c. 1800

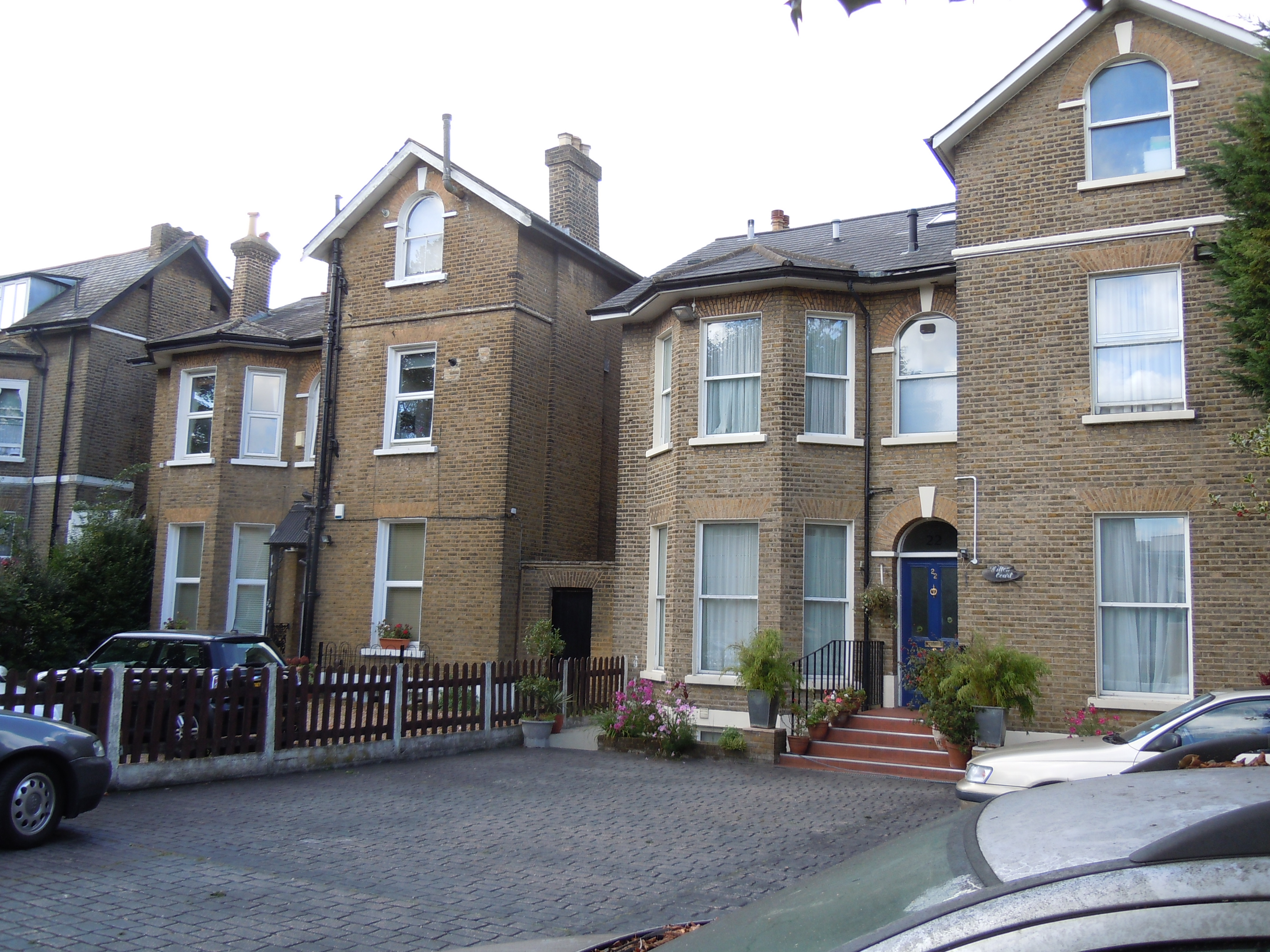
Villas c. 1880

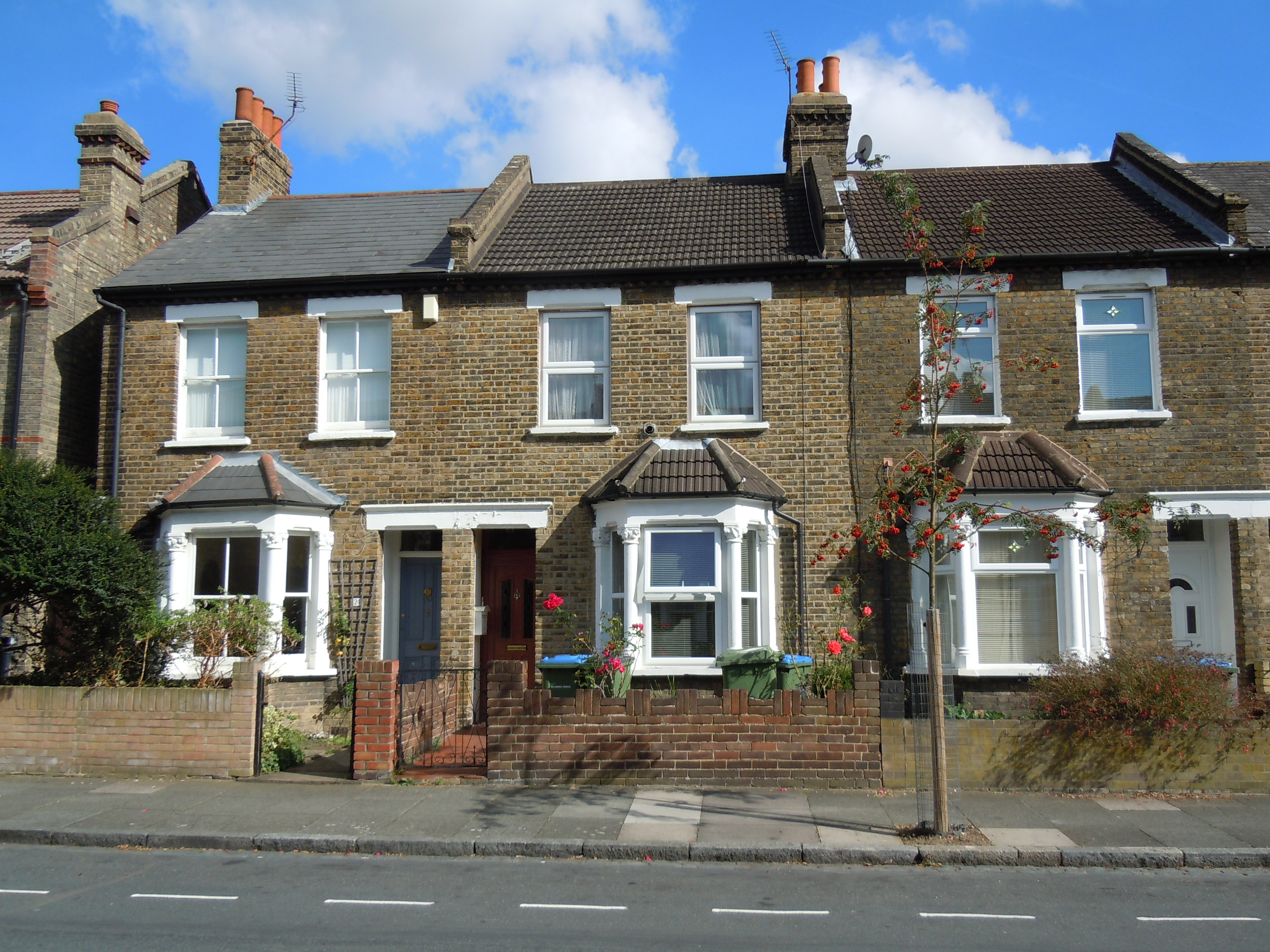
Terrace houses c. 1880

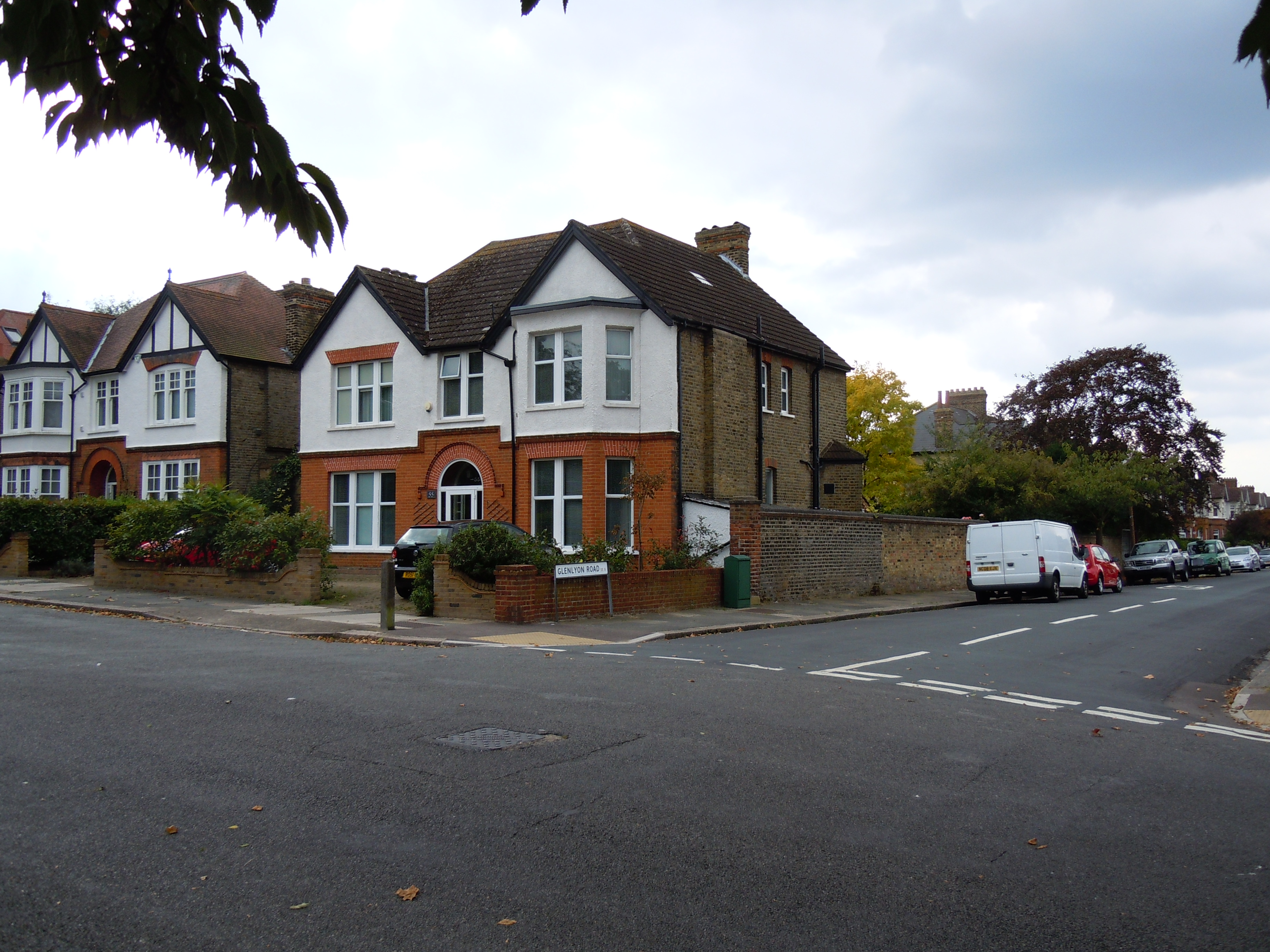
"Corbett Houses" Eltham Park c. 1905

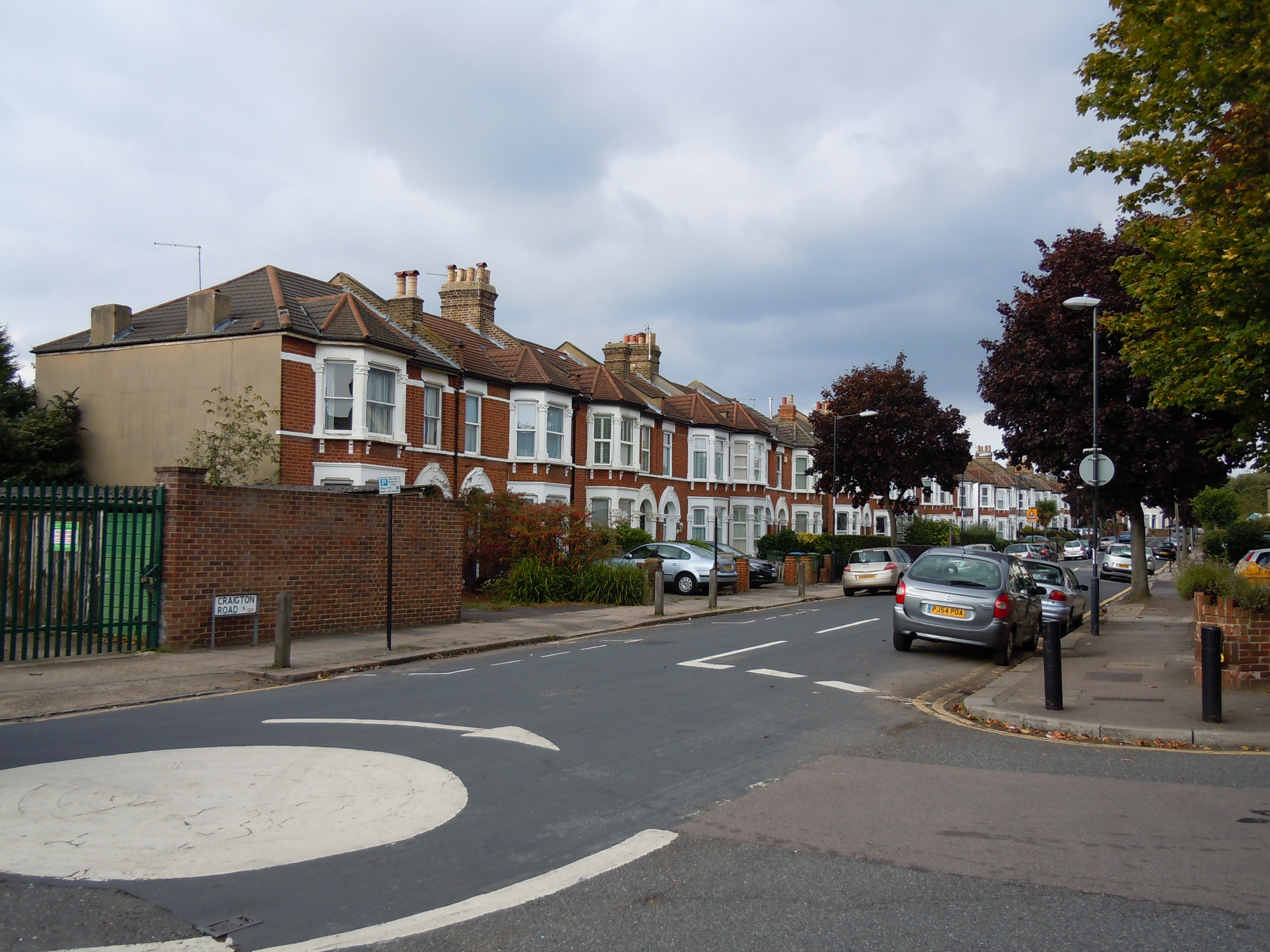
"Corbett Houses" Well Hall c. 1905

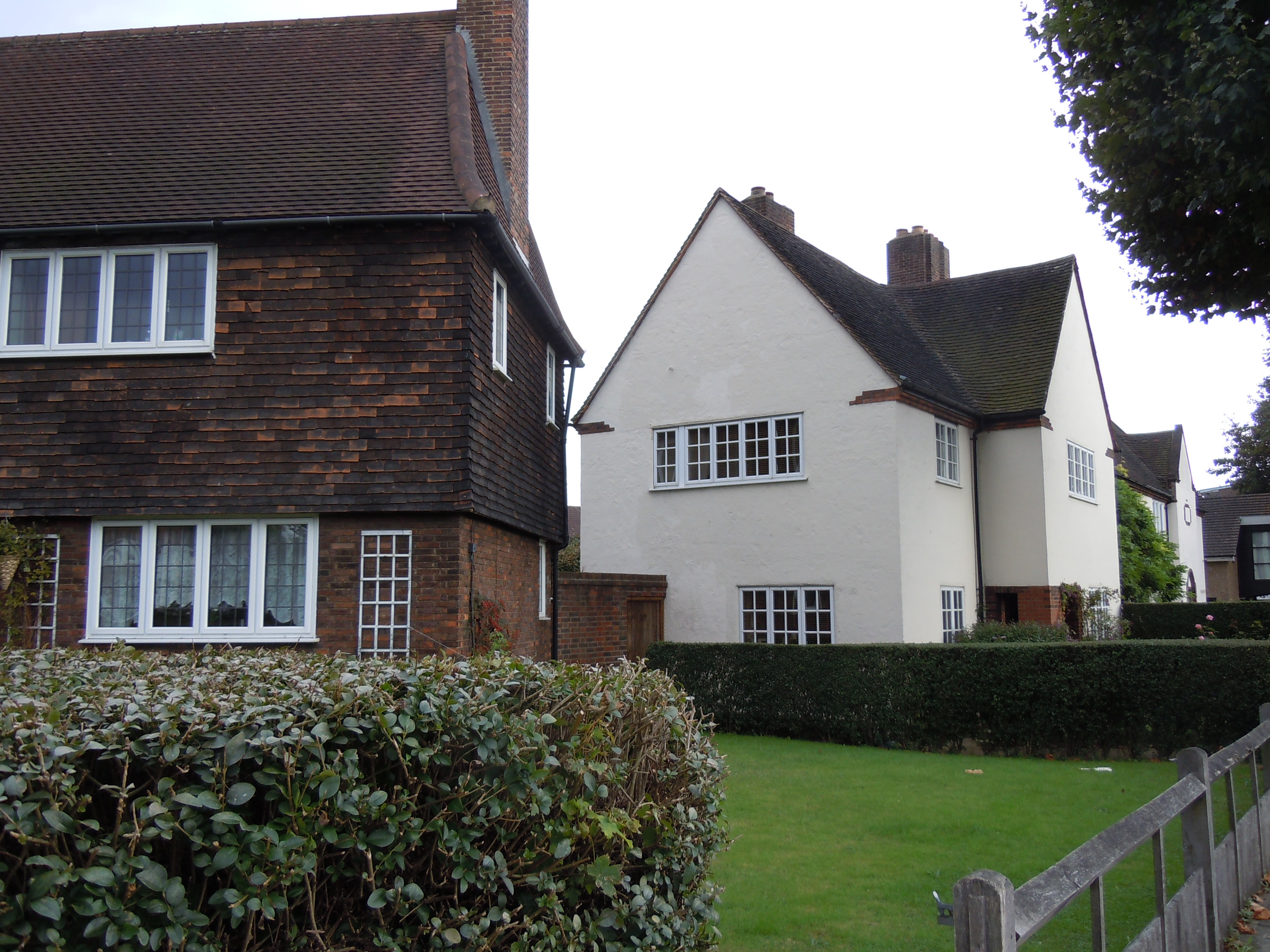
Progress Estate. Built 1915

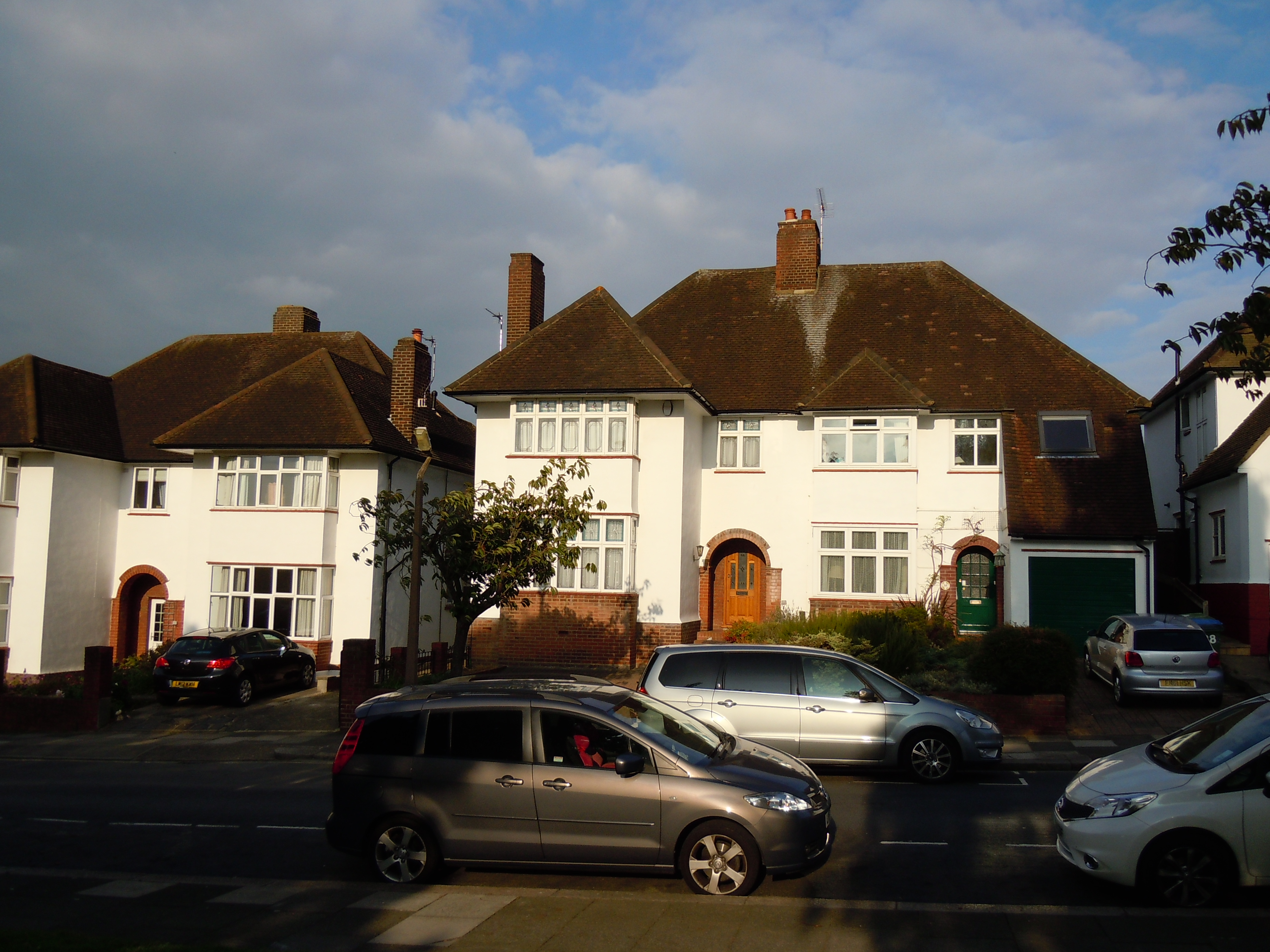
Semi-detached houses. Built 1938

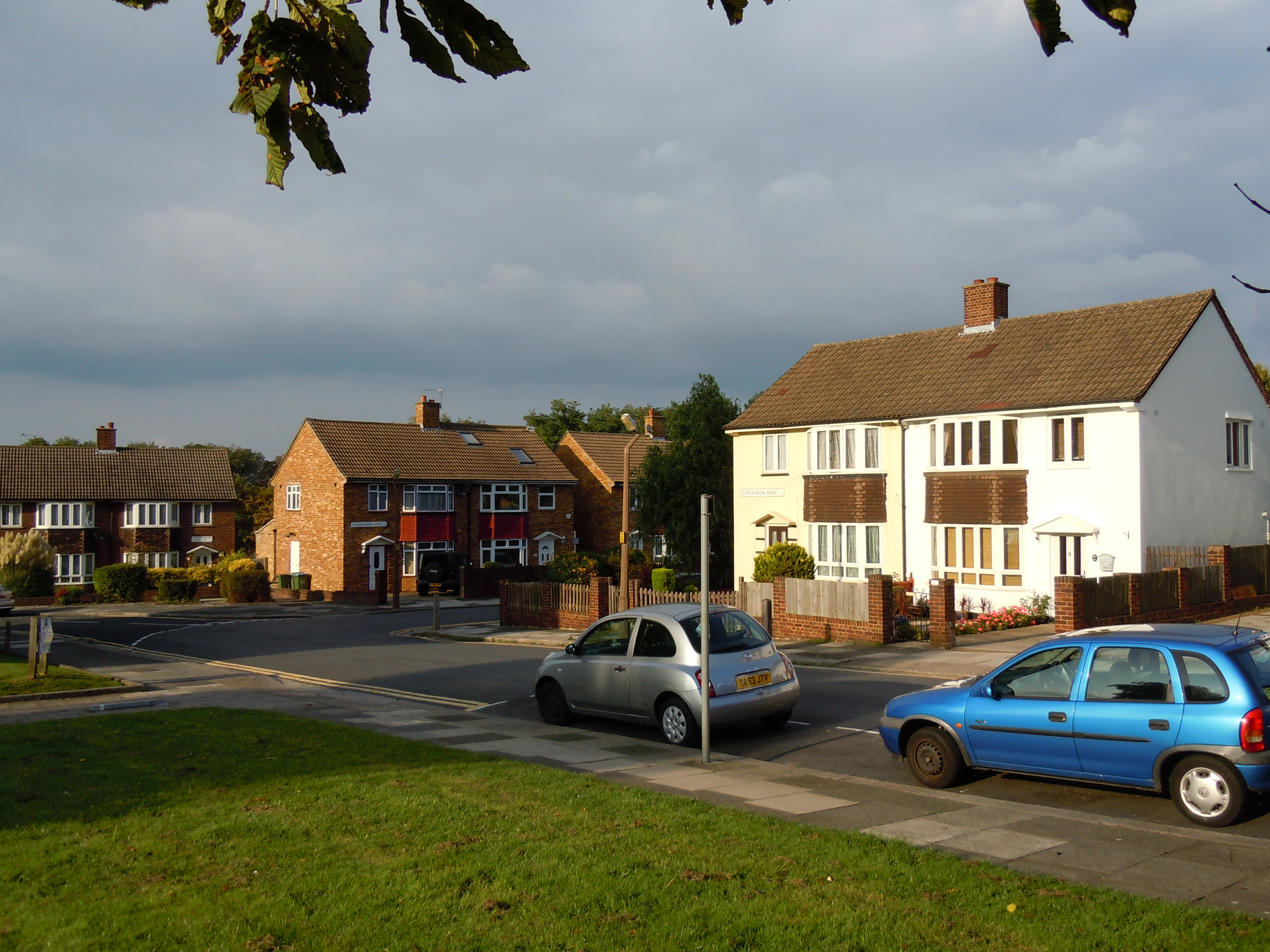
Local authority houses c. 1955

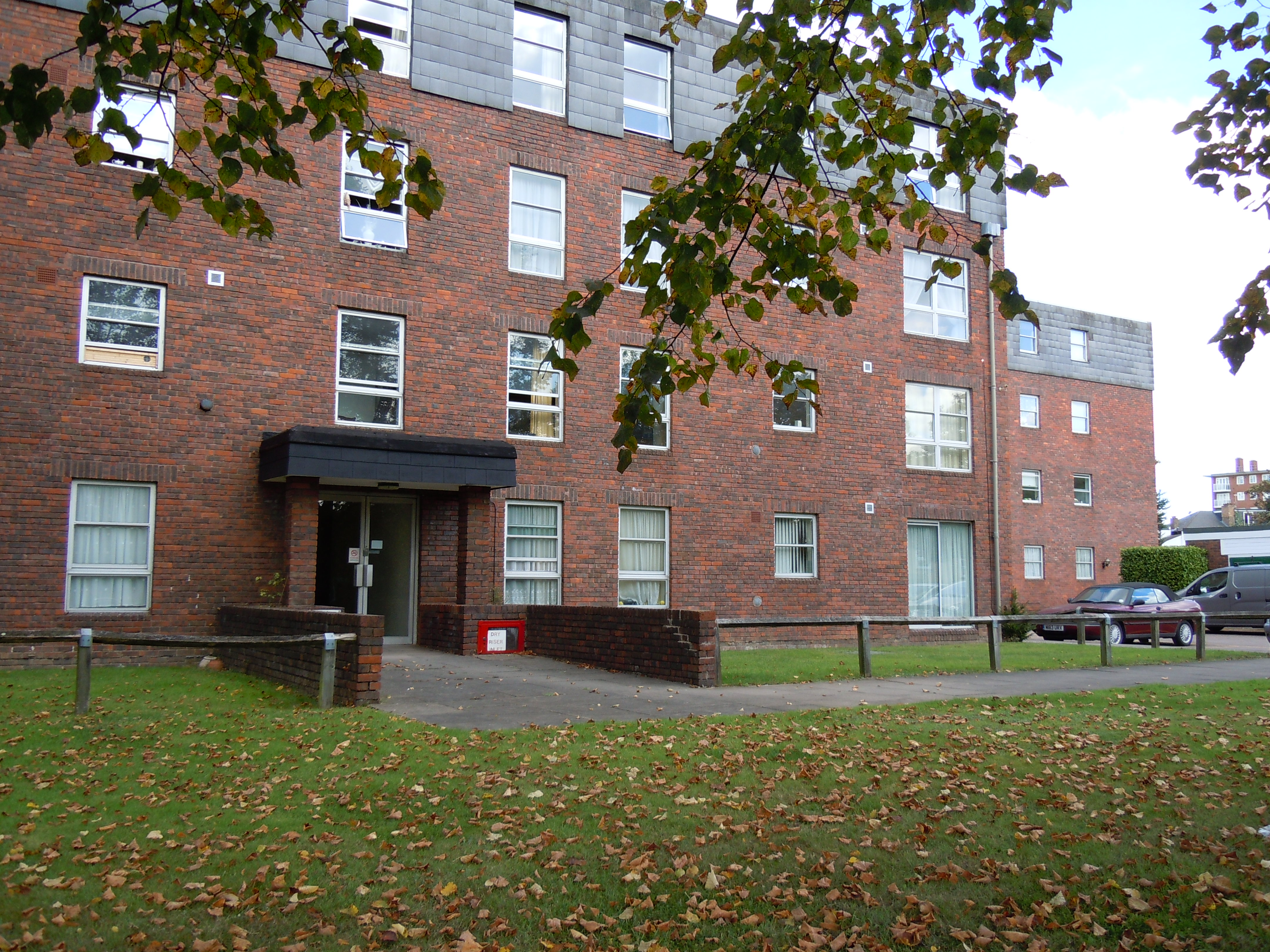
Flats c. 1980. Replaced Victorian villas

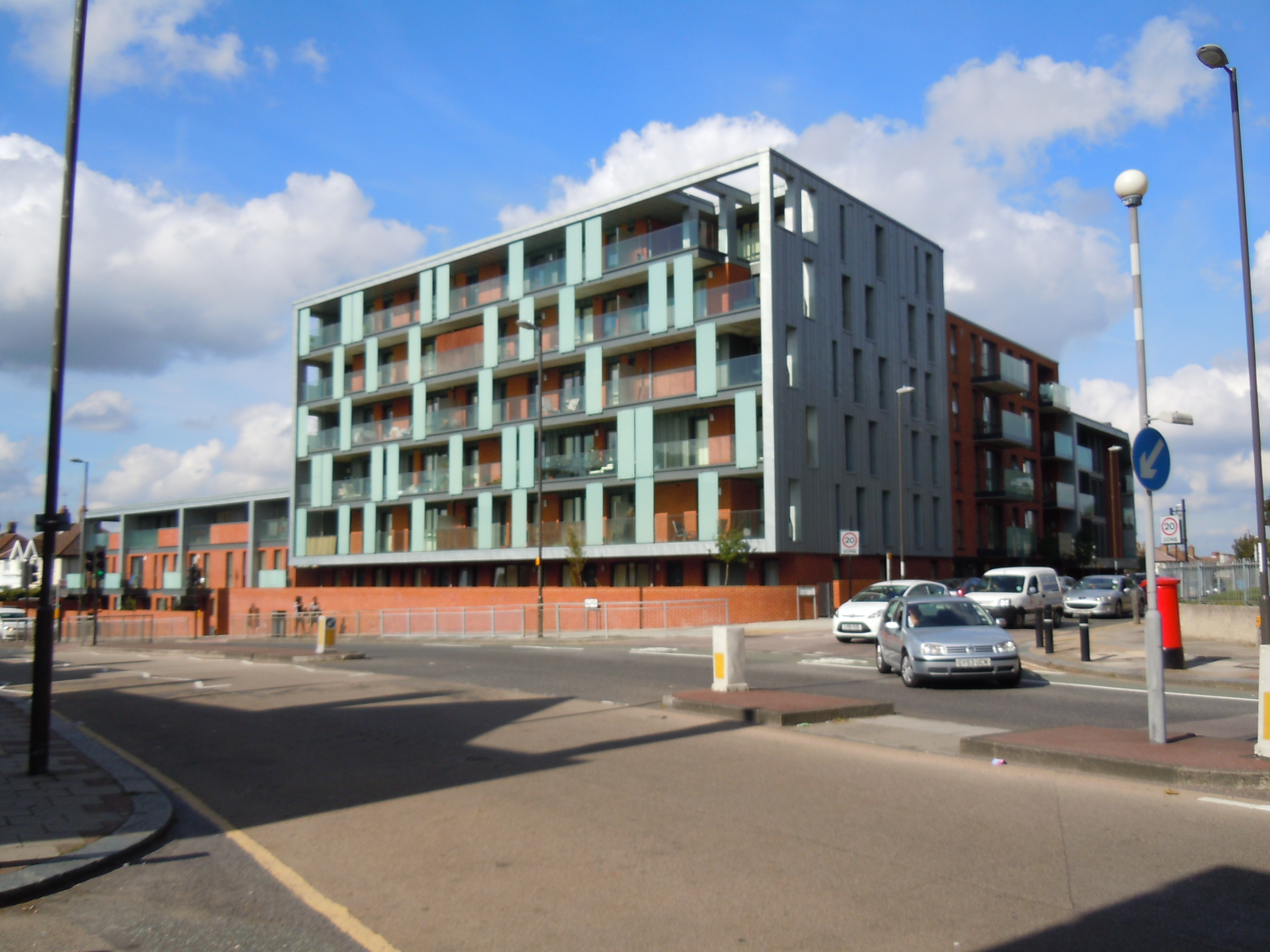
Flats c. 2012. Replaced old swimming pool

=== Incidents ===
In 1990, an IRA bomb outside the Eltham Palace headquarters of the Royal Army Educational Corps injured seven people (see 1990 Eltham bombing). The area was targeted three times by the Mardi Gra bomber in the 1990s.

== Geography ==
=== Description and location ===
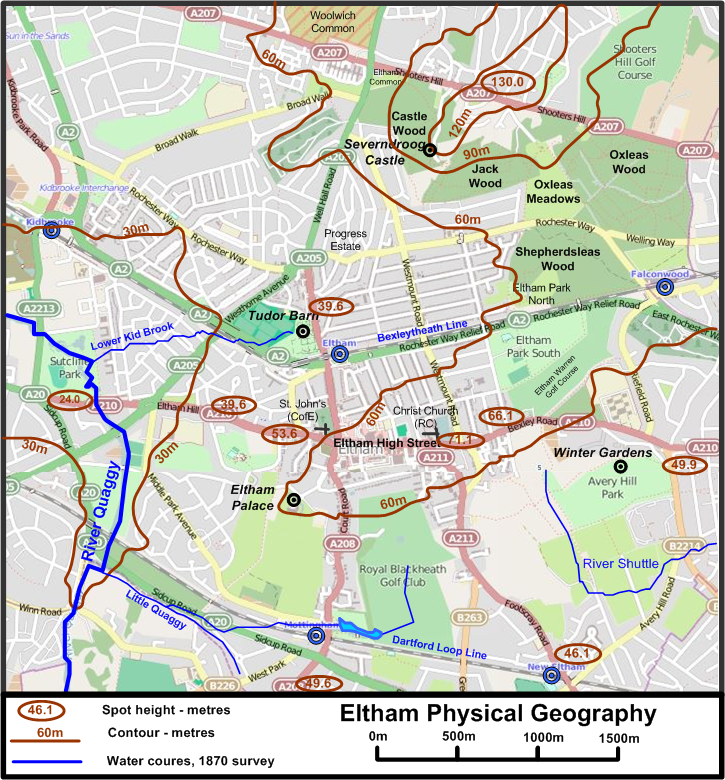
Map 6. Eltham: contours and water courses

Eltham has a varied topography. Map 6 shows contours, spot heights and water courses. The centre of Eltham is on a plateau at about the 60m level with the High Street running along its centre. There is a scarp slope to the west of the plateau from the top of which are unrestricted views across South London. Eltham Palace occupies a commanding position on the edge of the scarp. Eltham Hill offers the steepest descent from the plateau, starting at Eltham High Street and descending 30m over 1 km due west at the Yorkshire Grey (now a McDonald's outlet). The land to the north of Eltham rises to form the southern slope of Shooter's Hill, one of the highest points in London at a height of 430 feet (130 m). The recently (2014) restored 18th century belvedere Severndroog Castle offers wide views from its observation platform which is 490 feet (150 m) above sea level.

From Eltham Church at 200 feet (60 m) the High Street rises gently to 233 feet (71 m) and continues east as Bexley Road at a slightly lower level.

To the south the plateau slopes gently downwards to Mottingham (at 163 feet (49.6 m)) and New Eltham (at 151 feet (46.1 m))

Eltham is devoid of any major water features, although the River Thames is approximately 2 kilometres (1.2 mi) away from Eltham's northern limits. The most prominent body of water is the River Quaggy which runs to the south-west of Eltham feeding the wetlands in Sutcliffe Park before joining the River Ravensbourne at Lewisham. The Quaggy receives additional water from a tributary named Little Quaggy which flows through the lake of The Tarn in Mottingham. The only other significant watercourse is the River Shuttle, which rises in Avery Hill Park and flows east to join the River Cray.

Other nearby areas

- Blackfen
- Catford
- Charlton
- Chislehurst
- Downham
- Hither Green
- Greenwich
- Grove Park
- Lewisham
- Plumstead
- Sidcup
- Welling
- Woolwich

=== Parks and open spaces ===
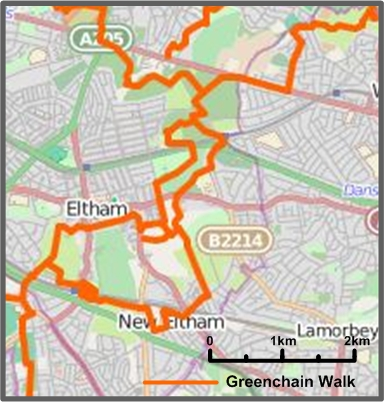
Green Chain Walks in and through Eltham

There is a large variety of open green space in Eltham, in the form of parkland, fields and woodland. "Green Chain Walks" are signposted footpaths that run through or link the green spaces. Some are also bridleways or cycle routes.

- Avery Hill Park is large, open parkland, to the east. It is most notable for its Winter Garden, a hothouse containing tropical trees and plants from around the world. The parkland was acquired by the London County Council in 1902.
- Oxleas Woods, Castle Wood and Jack Wood, directly north of Eltham, is a Site of Special Scientific Interest. Oxleas Wood covers 190.3 acres (0.8 km^{2}) and is at least 8,000 years old. The wood is home to specimen of tree including oak, silver birch, hornbeam and coppice hazel. Severndroog Castle, built in 1784 as a memorial to William James of the East India Company, stands in Castle Wood.
- Sutcliffe Park is a 35 acres (0.1 km^{2}) park at the westernmost point of Eltham. Previously known as Harrow Meadow, the parkland was reclaimed from the River Quaggy in the 1930s. The Quaggy was diverted into culverts, and the park officially opened in 1937 as Sutcliffe Park, named after the Borough's engineer. On 26 June 1954, the athletics track in Sutcliffe Park was opened, and has since been home to the Cambridge Harriers. In 2003, the park was re-landscaped as a wetland area. The River Quaggy was allowed to flow above-ground in the area, for the first time in 70 years. The park borders the Ferrier Estate, which was completed in 1970 and demolished by 2012 to make way for "Kidbrooke Village".
- The Royal Blackheath Golf Club dates back to Tudor times. The golf club, claimed to be founded in 1608 to the north in Blackheath and to the south since its merger with Eltham Golf club in 1923, is reportedly the oldest golf club in the world. However, other sources set its founding date to be 1766, which would still make it the oldest golf club outside of Scotland. The club house Eltham Lodge is a grade I listed building.
- Well Hall Pleasaunce – formal gardens, ponds and woodland, originally the site of a manor house, in Well Hall
- Eltham Park North and Eltham Park South are the final major green areas in Eltham. The southern park is adjacent to the Eltham Warren Golf Course.
- The Tarn, 1 km (0.62 mi) south of Eltham High Street, a 9 acres (3.6 ha) public garden, and bird sanctuary, with a lake amongst woodland.
- Horn Park', 1.8 km (1.1 mi) southwest of Eltham High Street, a 16 acres (6.5 ha) public park in Horn Park, with grassland, woodland, playground, football pitch and skate park.

Eltham Parks North and South, Avery Hill, Sutcliffe Park, The Tarn, Well Hall Pleasaunce and Horn Park all have Green Flag status.

In the 1990s the defence of Oxleas Wood to the north east of the town became a focus for a pan-European campaign to resist high capacity urban roads. Significantly the European Court of Justice found the UK government at fault for not adequately assessing the environmental impact of the planned road, that would have joined Beckton to Falconwood and perhaps – if objectors' fears are to be believed – been a first stage of a wider orbital road through Catford (a revival of a Greater London Council-backed Ringway Two).

Green places in Eltham

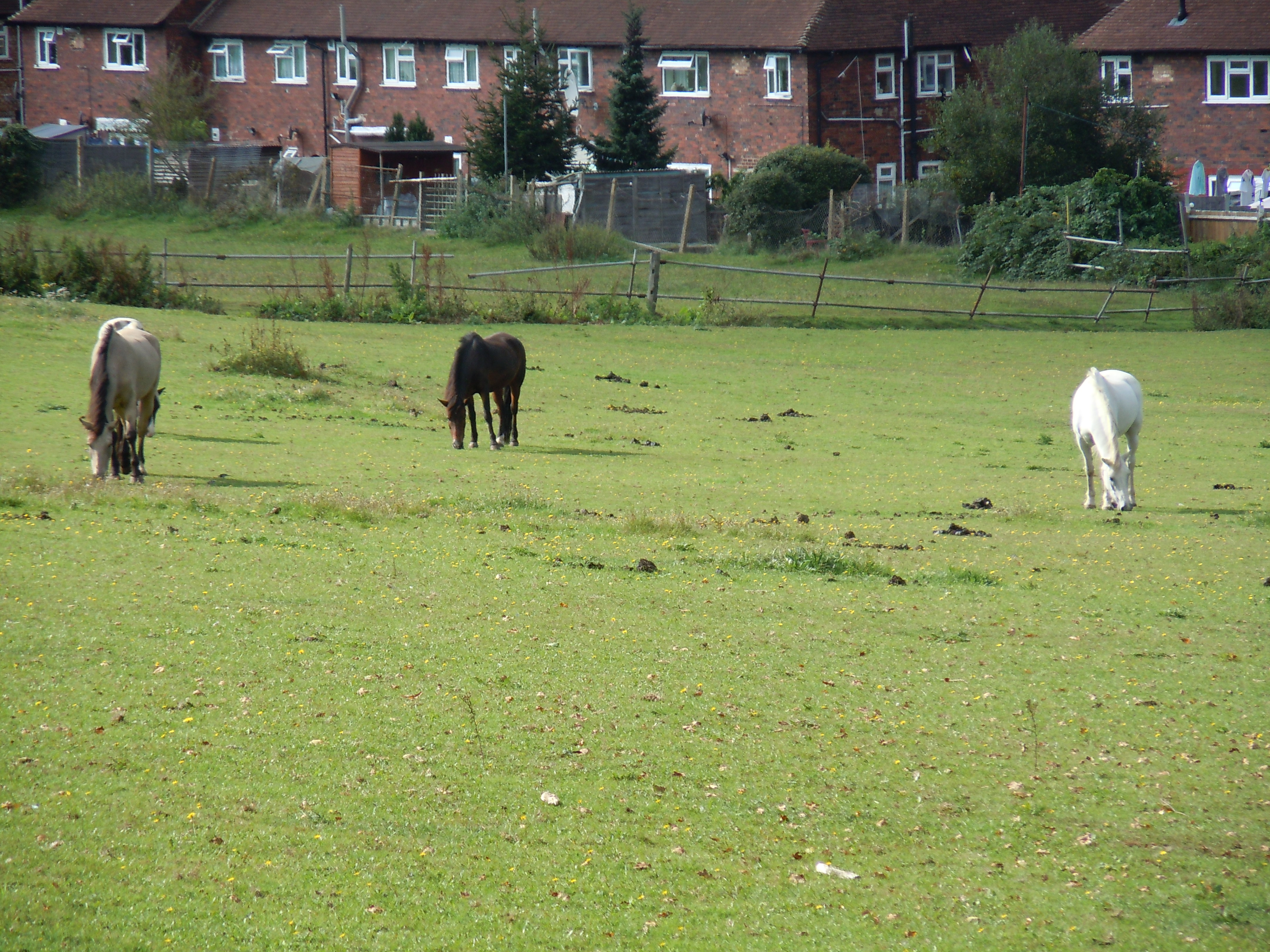
King John's Walk (Green Chain Walk)

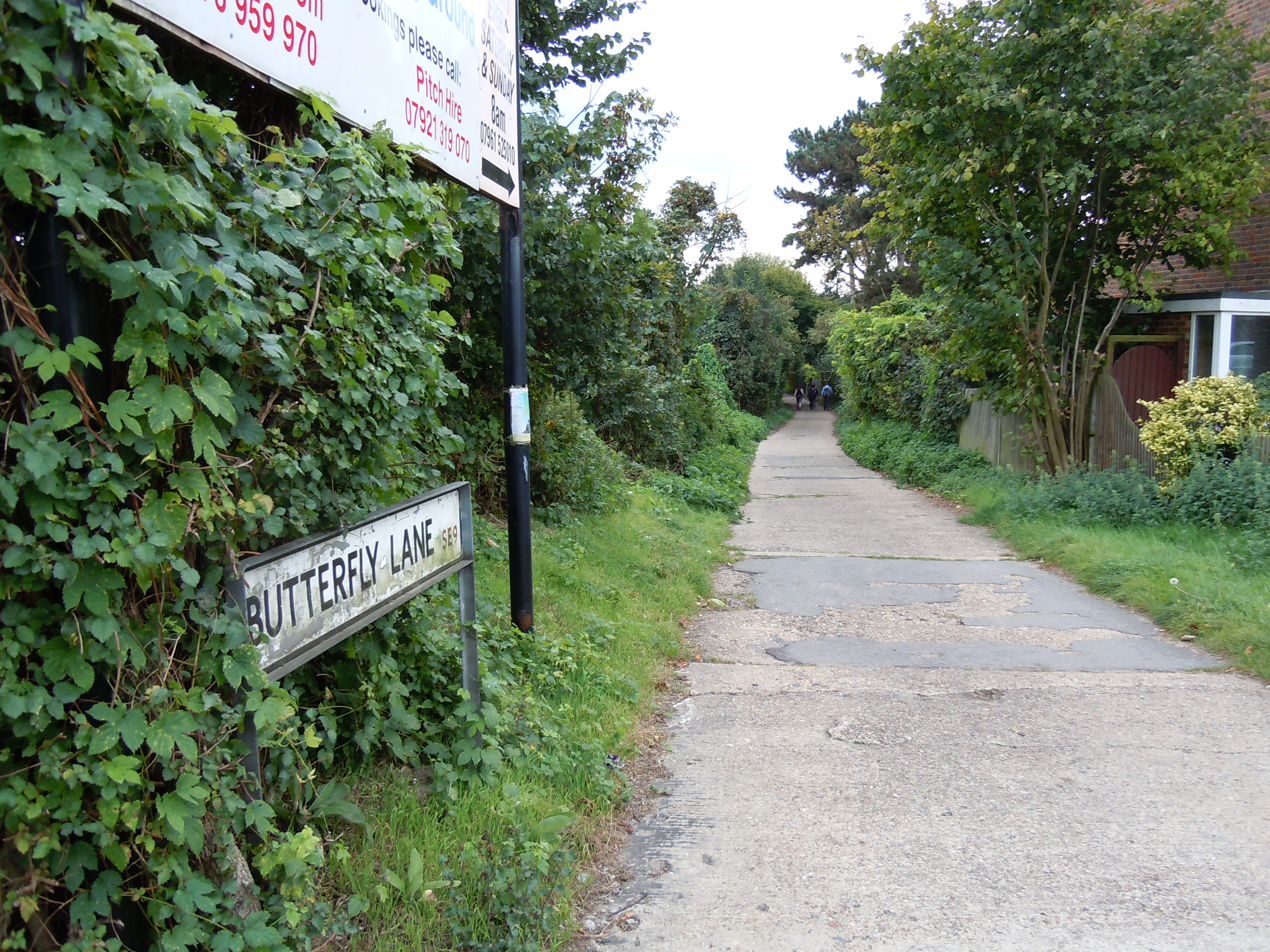
Butterfly Lane

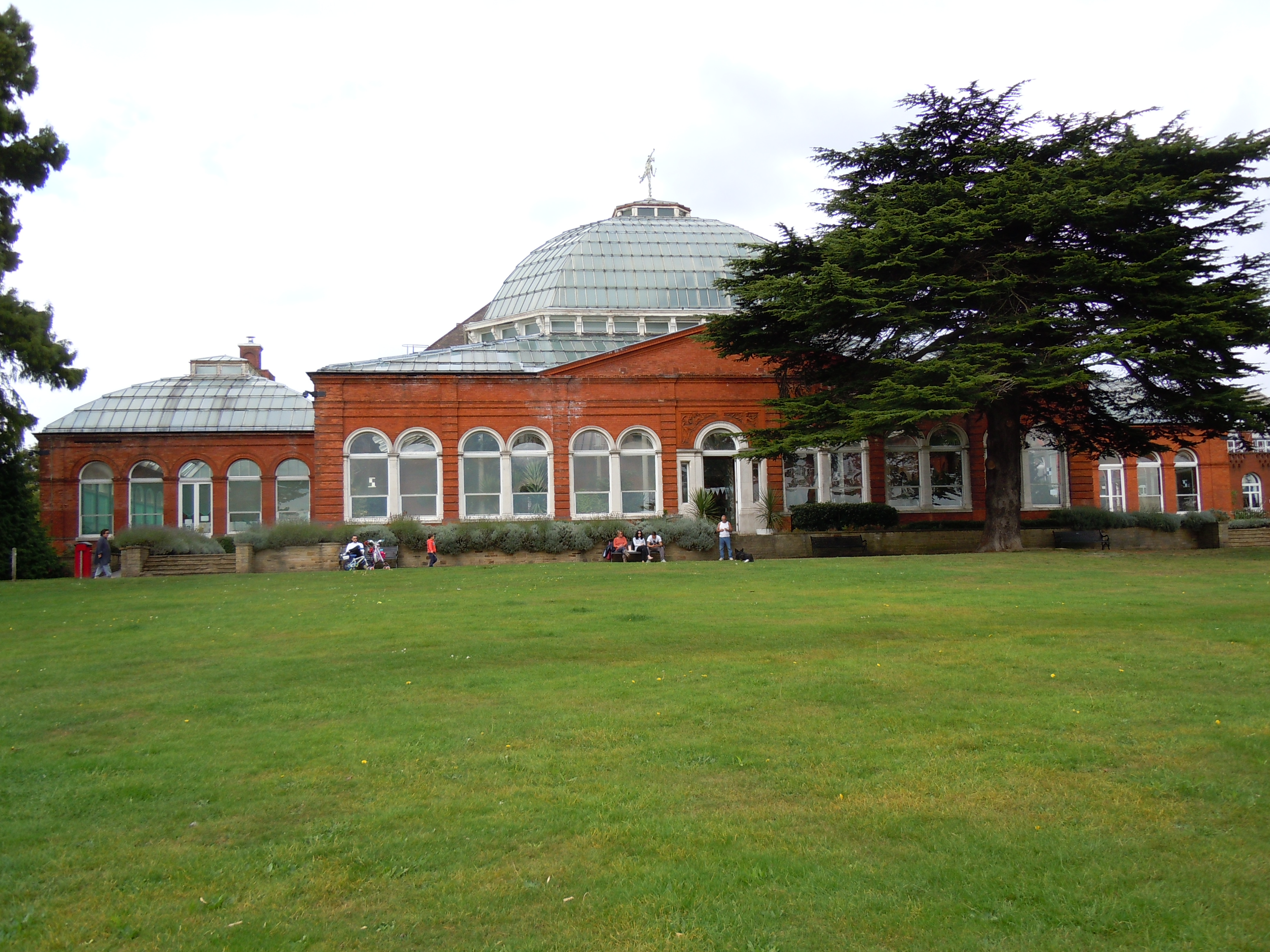
Avery Hill Park (Green Chain Walk) and the Winter Gardens

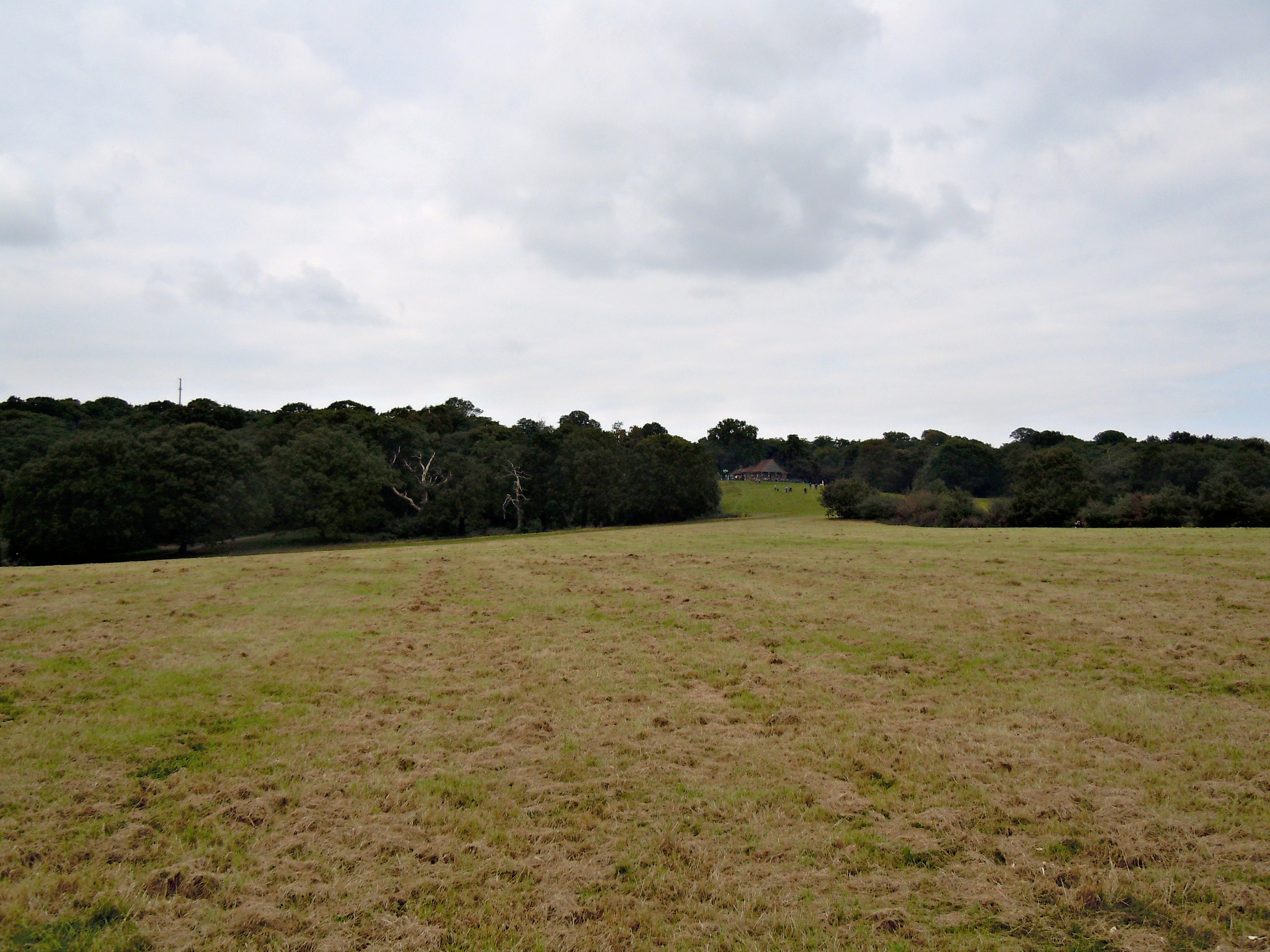
Oxleas meadows (Green Chain Walk)

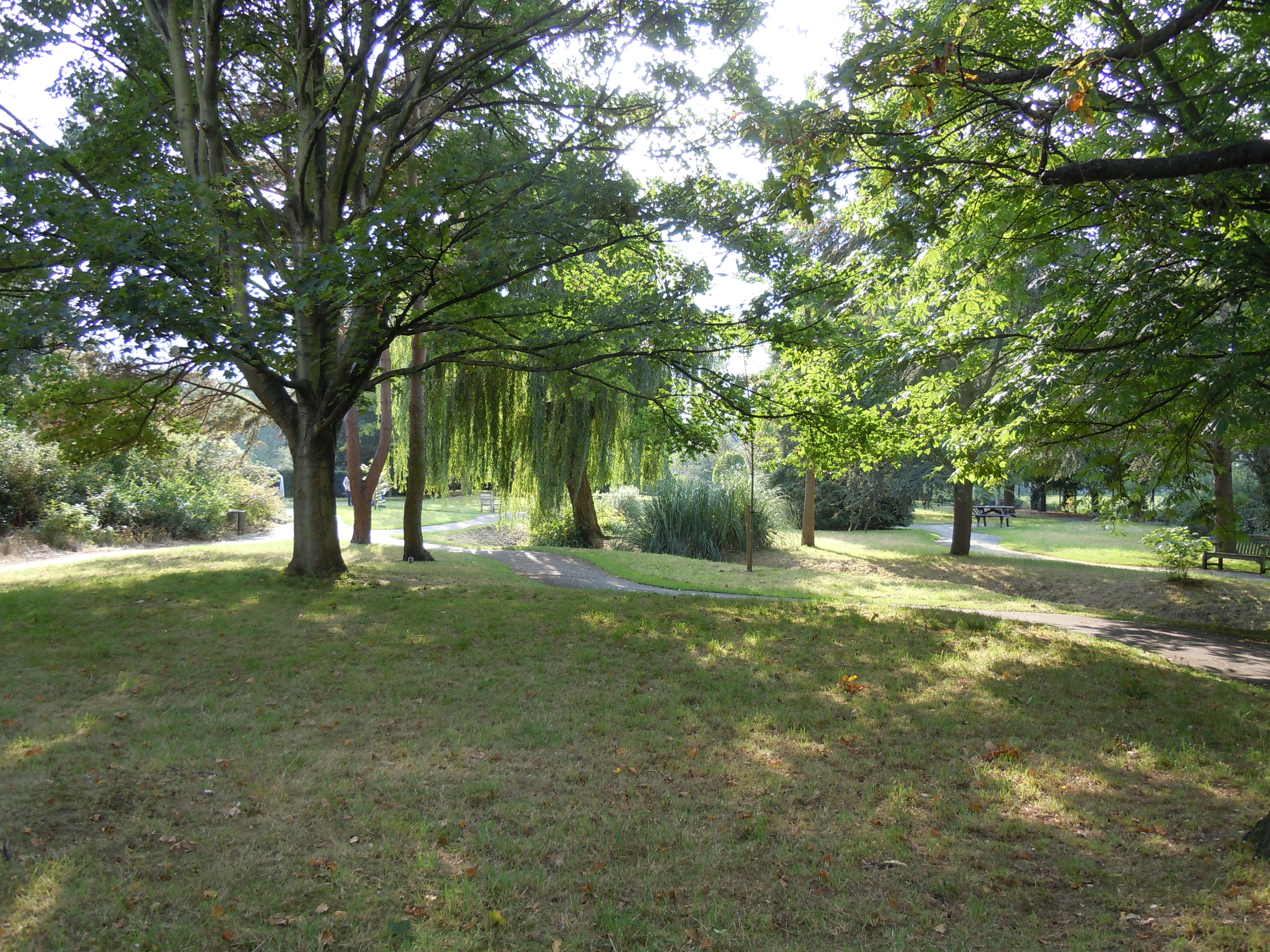
Well Hall Pleasaunce - Woodland Garden

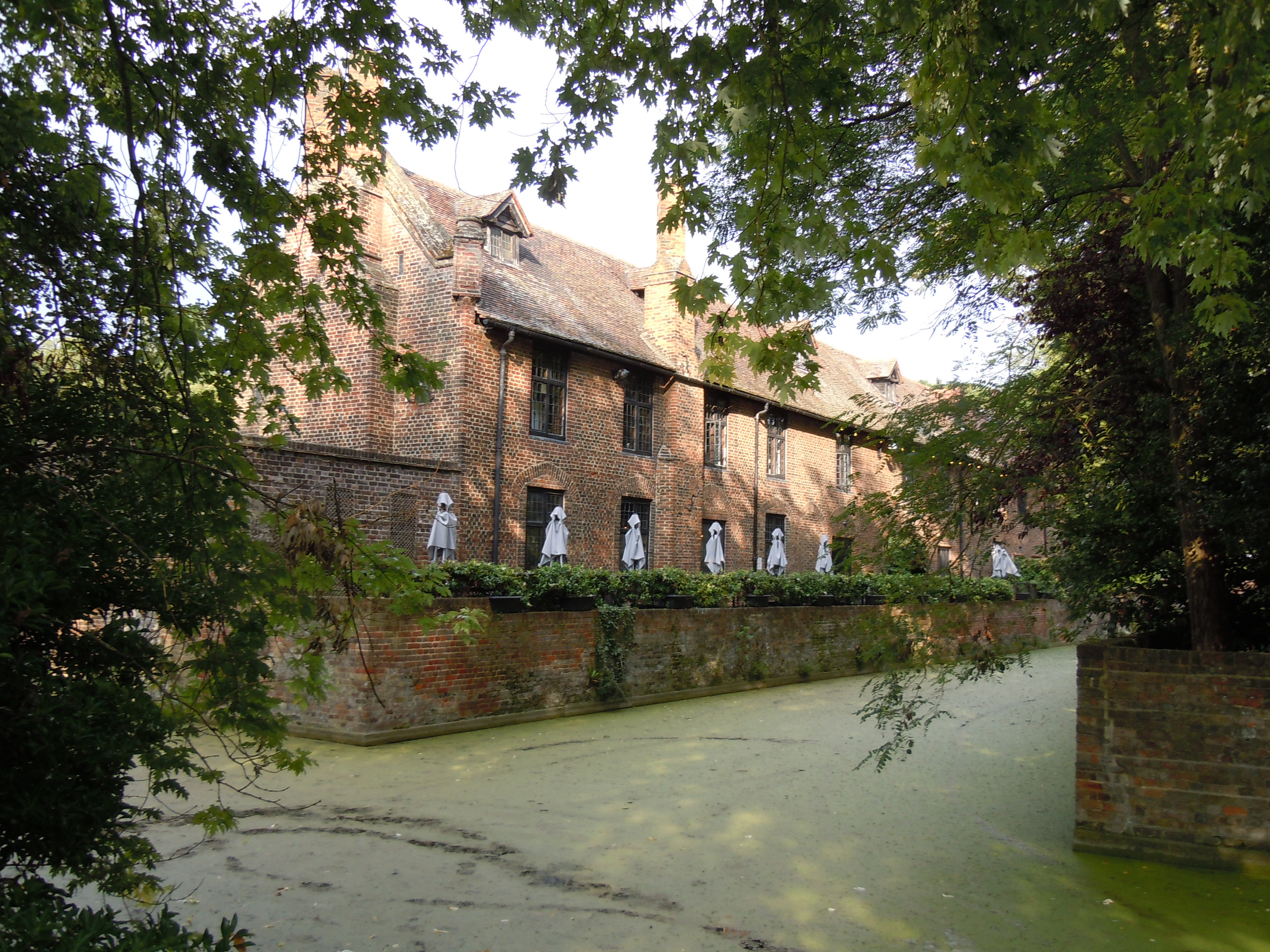
Well Hall Pleasaunce - Tudor Barn

The Royal Borough of Greenwich maintains an online directory of open spaces. Most parks have active Friends groups.

== Demographics ==
In December 2010, the population of Eltham parliament constituency was 63,059, although this figure includes the wards of Coldharbour and New Eltham, Kidbrooke with Hornfair and Shooter's Hill. 63,082 people live in the SE9 postcode district; of these, 30,398 are male and 32,684 are female. People over 65 make up 17.9% of Eltham's electorate.

=== Migration and ethnicity ===
At the census of 2011, the white population of Eltham was recorded at 80.95%; the largest minority group in Eltham was Black-African and Black-Caribbean people, who comprised 7.46% of the total population with Asians comprising 6.62%. Eltham's proportion of white residents is significantly higher than the Royal Borough of Greenwich average of 62.5%. Eltham's population by ward in 2011 was as follows:

Eltham West

- Total Population: 10,399
  - Total White: 7,845 (75.4%)
  - Total Mixed: 355 (3.4%)
  - Total Asian: 792 (7.6%)
  - Total Black: 1,193 (11.5%)
  - Total other: 214 (2.1%)

Eltham North

- Total Population: 12,519
  - Total White: 11,104 (88.7%)
  - Total Mixed: 341 (2.7%)
  - Total Asian: 614 (4.9%)
  - Total Black: 368 (2.9%)
  - Total other: 92 (0.7%)

Eltham South

- Total Population: 12,541
  - Total White: 10,430 (83.2%)
  - Total Mixed: 395 (3.1%)
  - Total Asian: 894 (7.1%)
  - Total Black: 665 (5.3%)
  - Total other: 157 (1.3%)

Middle Park & Sutcliffe

- Total Population: 13,505
  - Total White: 10,260 (76.0%)
  - Total Mixed: 567 (4.2%)
  - Total Asian: 943 (7.0%)
  - Total Black: 1,425 (10.6%)
  - Total other: 310 (2.3%)

== Culture, identity and community ==
Eltham has an unusually high quotient of green space, with large areas of woodland to the north and east, including the historic woodland of Shooters Hill and Oxleas Wood, the Woodlands Farm community holding, Eltham Parks north and south and extensive parkland heading into Avery Hill park. Thus it is both 'suburban' and 'urban', and it forms part of the Royal Borough of Greenwich, an Inner London borough.

The town centre supports a loyal core of shoppers, diners, and drinkers, but the nightlife is modest. In recent years there has been great effort by local town centre businesses and other important Eltham stakeholders, to drive business, community and tourism improvements, that will help sustain the town centre. These efforts resulted in the formation of an Eltham town centre partnership (ETCP), chaired by an elected local stakeholder. Greenwich council had a member and officer representatives along with the University of Greenwich. The ETCP encouraged the development of A new town centre commerce Association – The Association of Commerce for Eltham (ACE). ACE established a new Town Centre web portal, which offered a basic business directory and tried to increase interaction between business and community groups. Both were offline as of June 2023.

In 2007, the new Eltham Centre opened just off the High Street including council offices and a new swimming pool and incorporating the early 20th century library.

The Eltham Society was founded in 1965 with the aim of "Preserving the past, Conserving the present, and Protecting the future". In 1993 it erected the Eltham Town sign in the high street. The Society is responsible for various publications.

In 2006 the community magazine "SEnine" was launched. As of 2023 it is published monthly and distributed free. As well as news and discussion of current affairs it also lists forthcoming events. It also carries many illustrated articles about Eltham history. Digitised copies of old issues are available on the SEnine website. A community website "This is Eltham" provides updates on current events.

High Street and environs

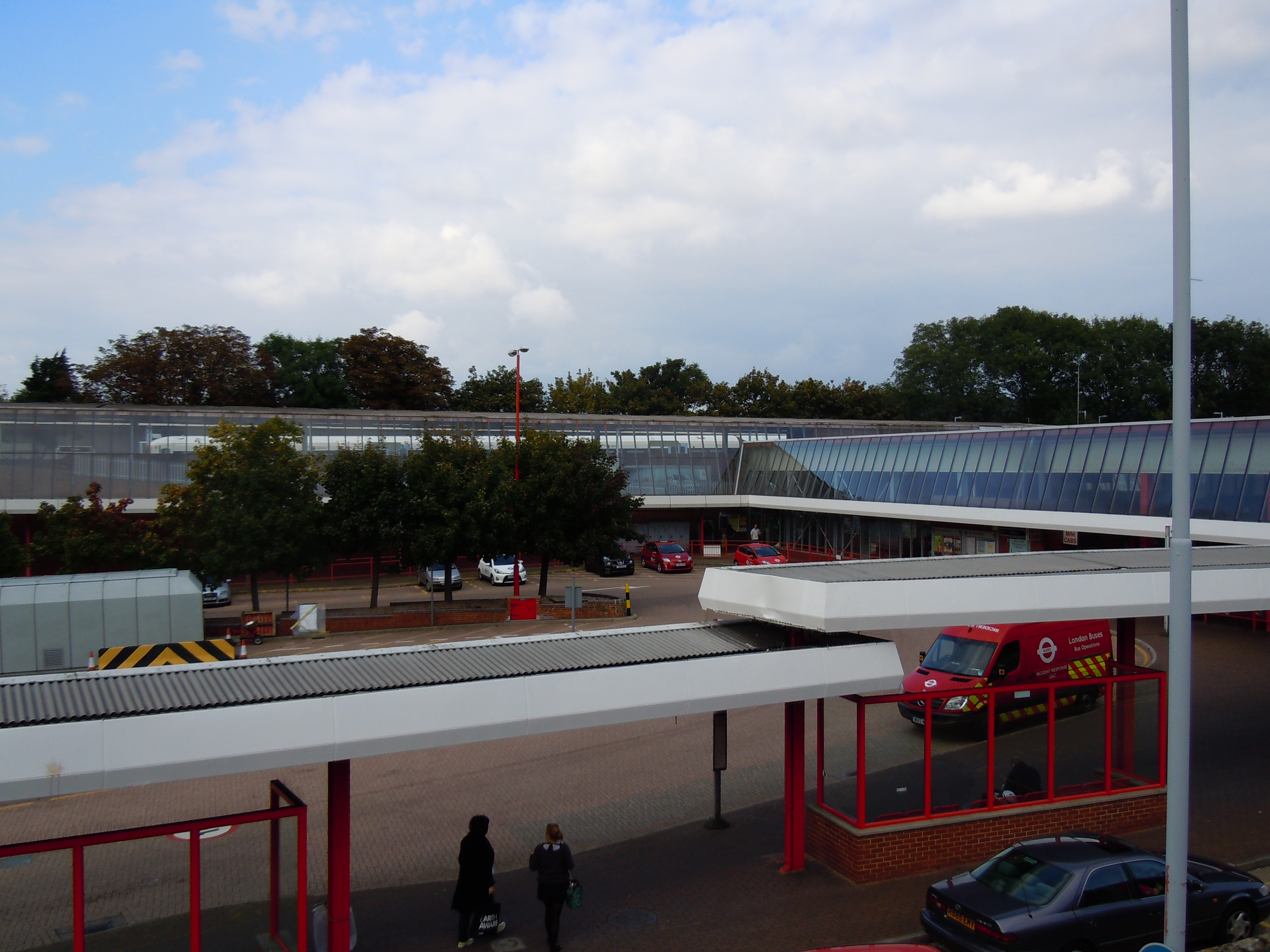
Eltham bus and train stations built 1986

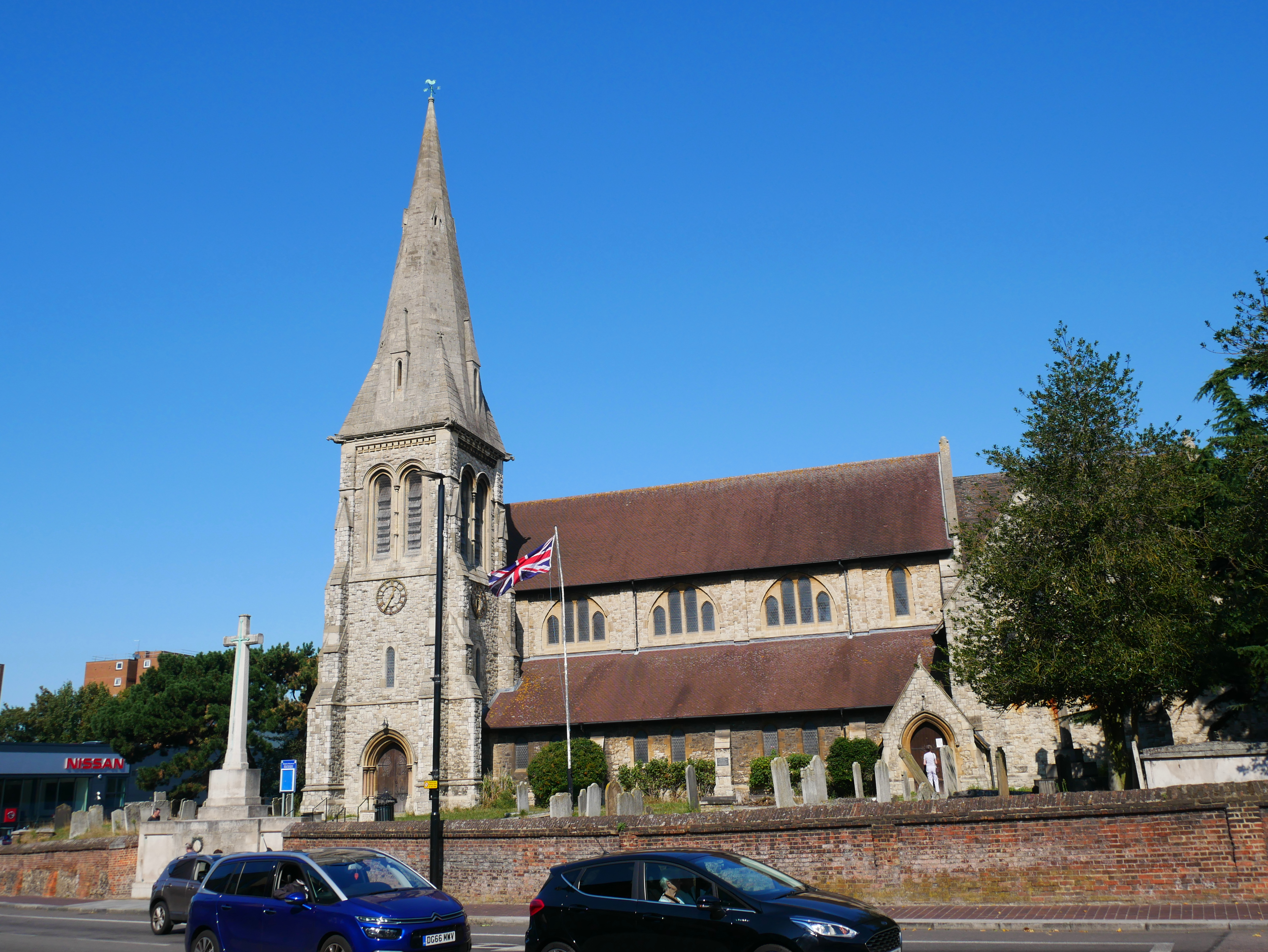
St. John's, a Church of England congregation

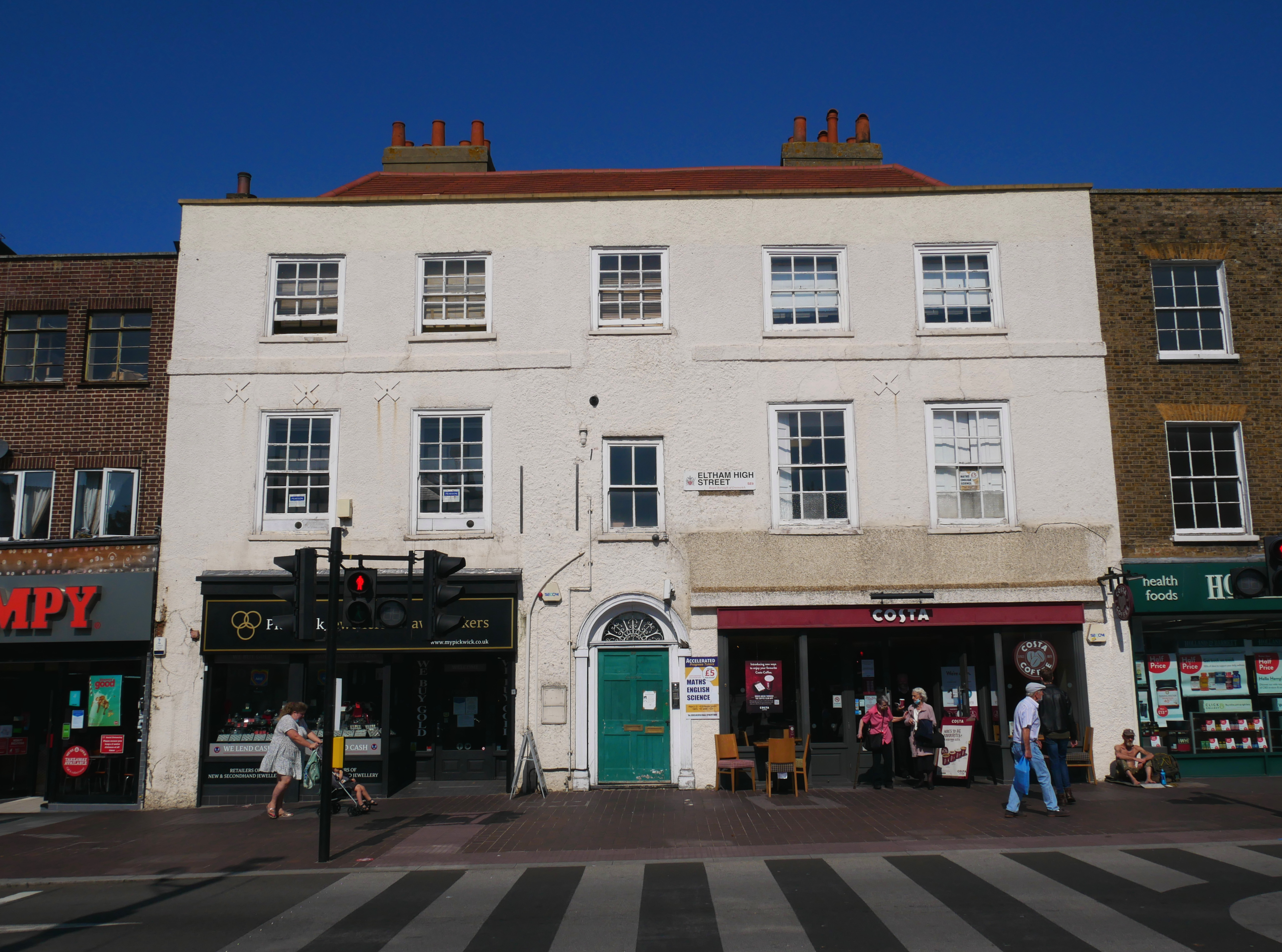
The 18th-century Cliefden House, a Grade II* listed building

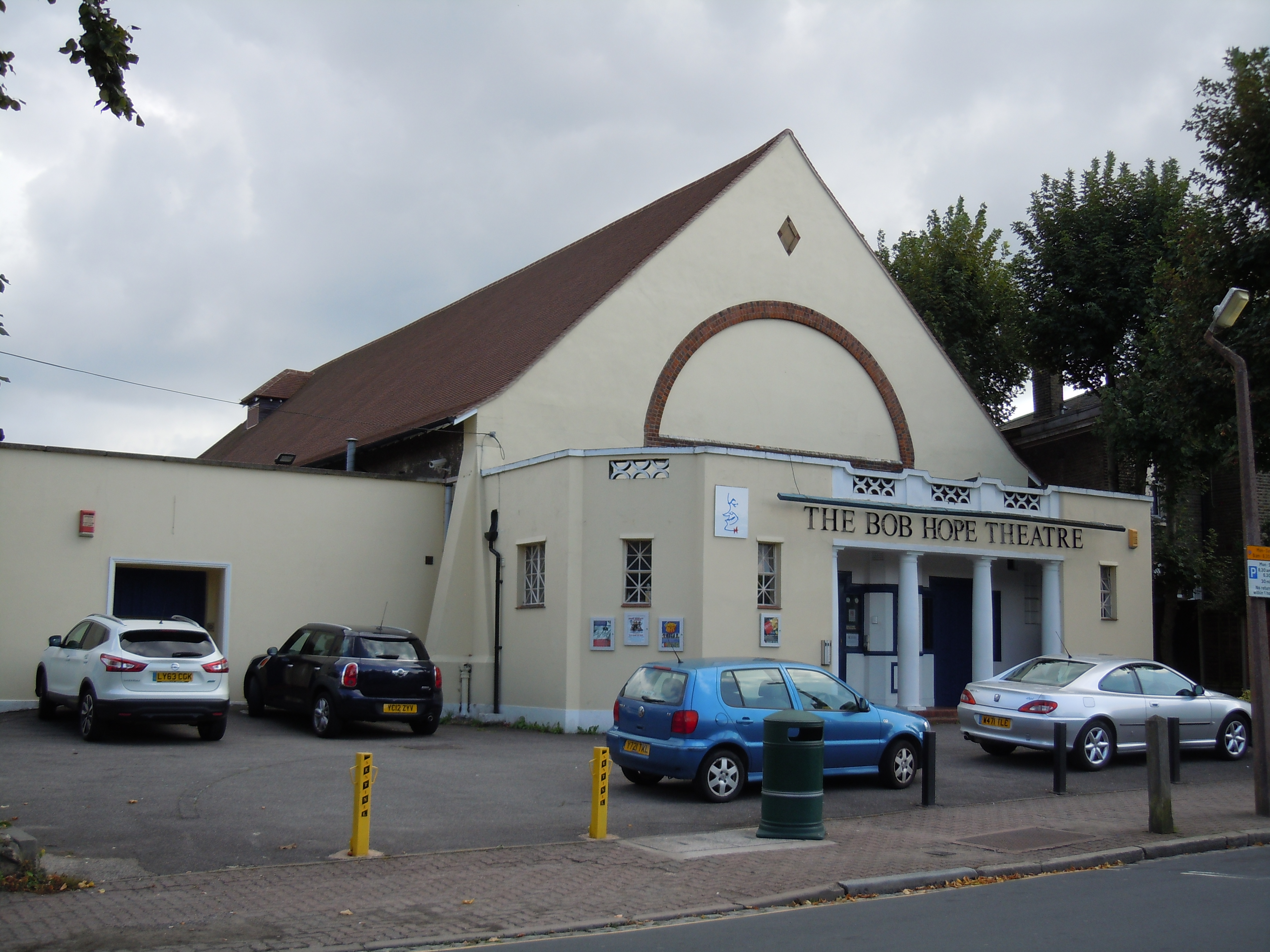
The Bob Hope Theatre

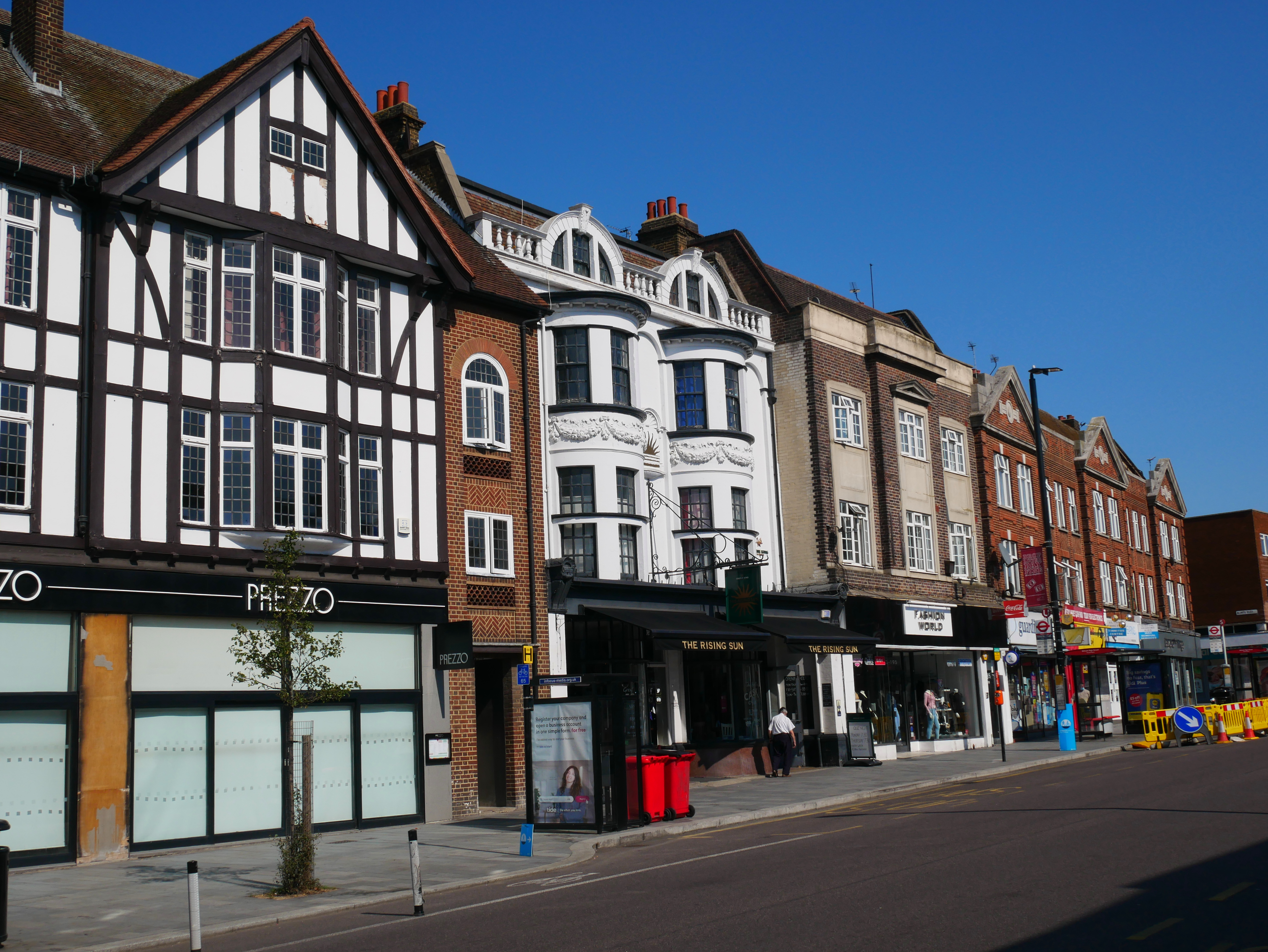
Buildings along the High Street, Eltham

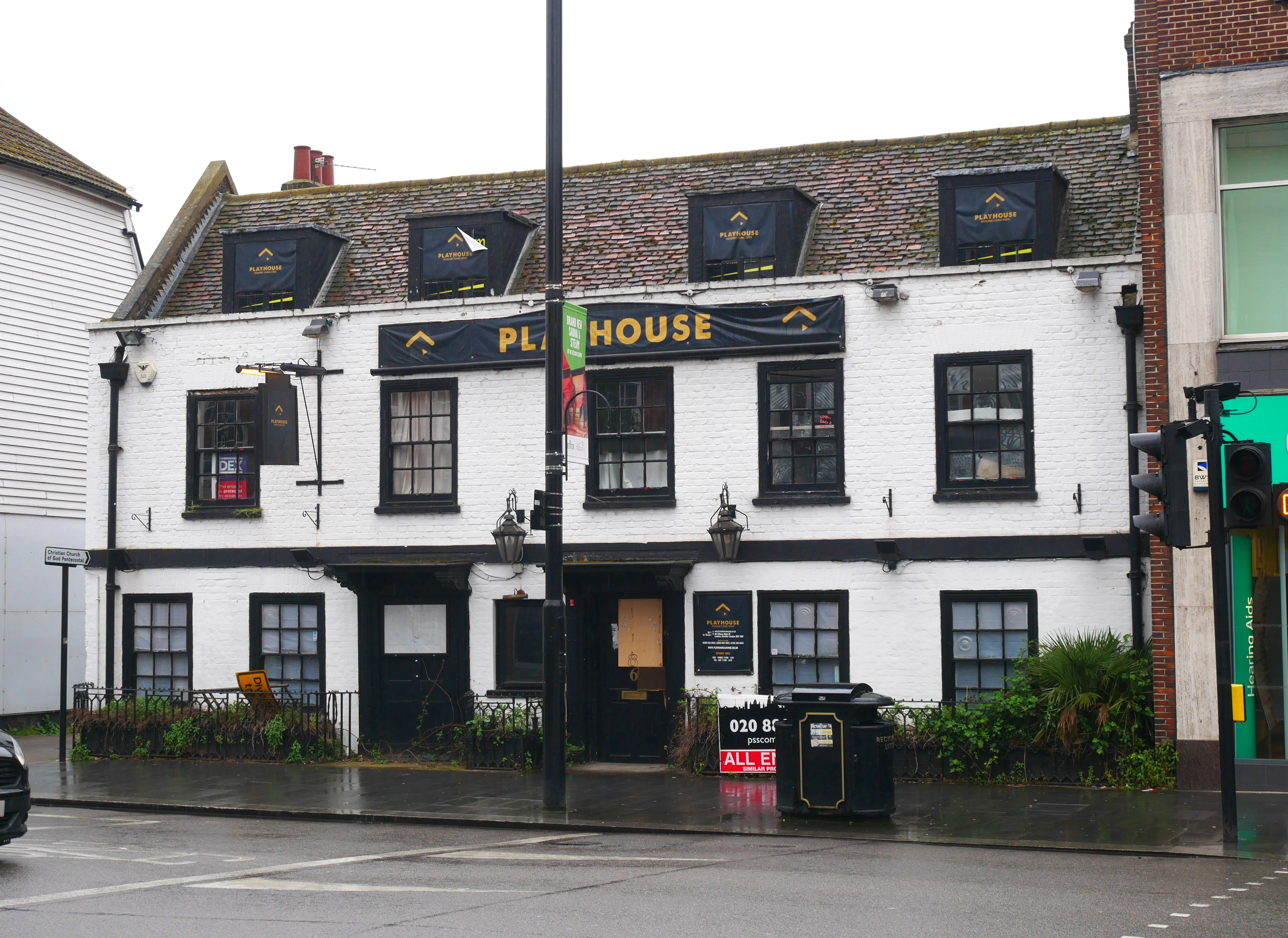
18th-century structure on the High Street, a Grade II listed building

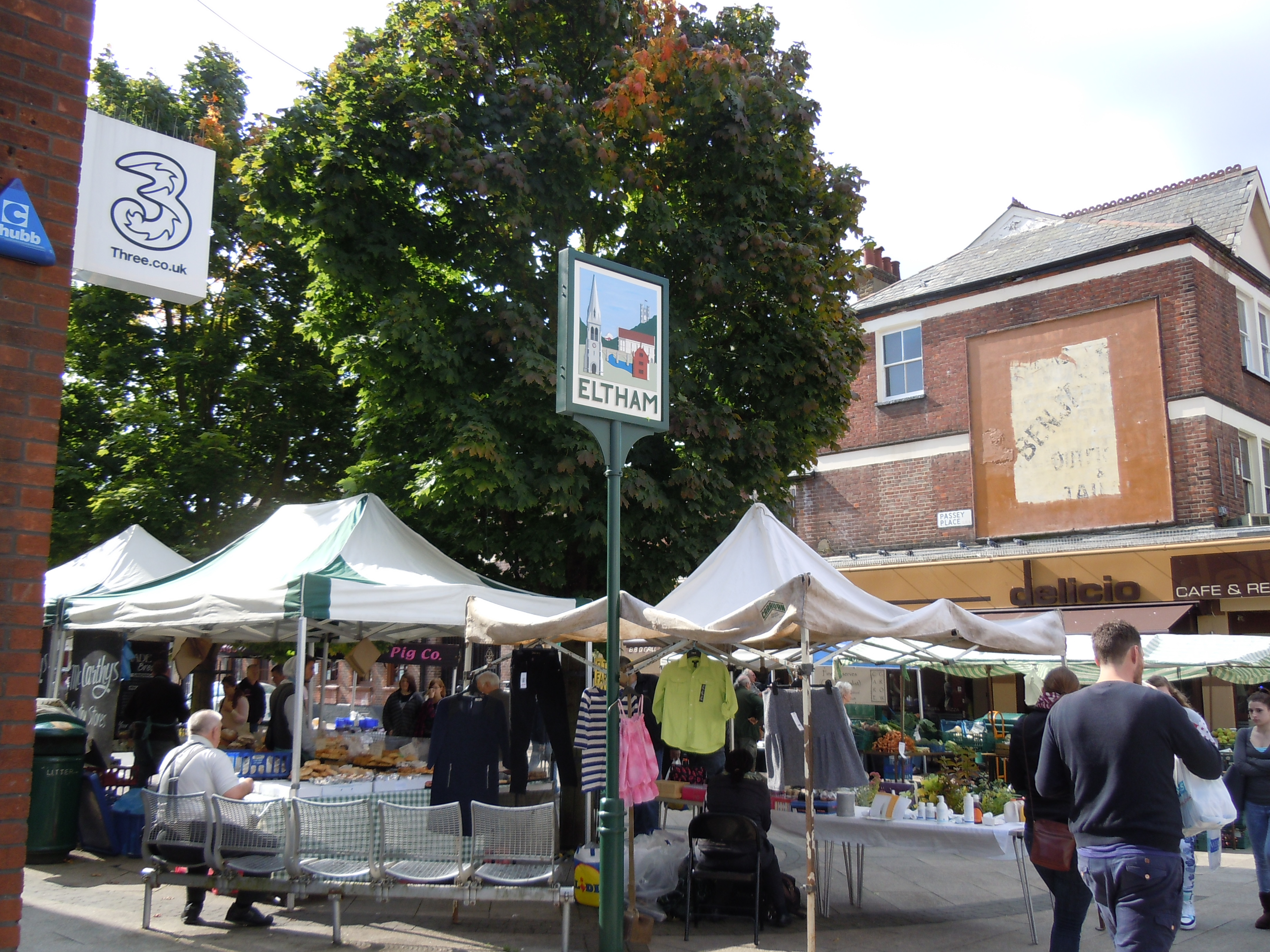
Sunday market and the Eltham town sign

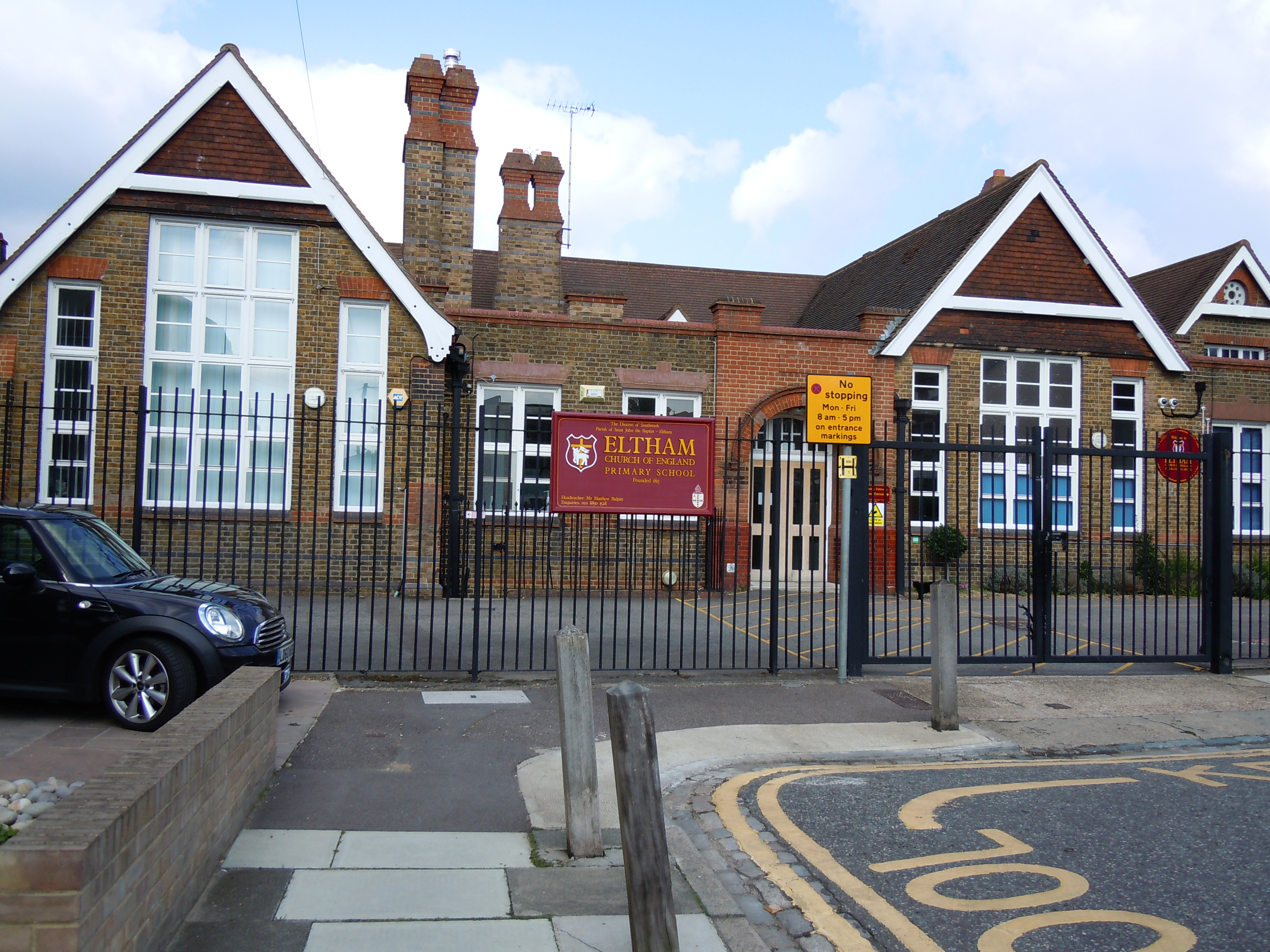
Eltham CofE School. founded 1814

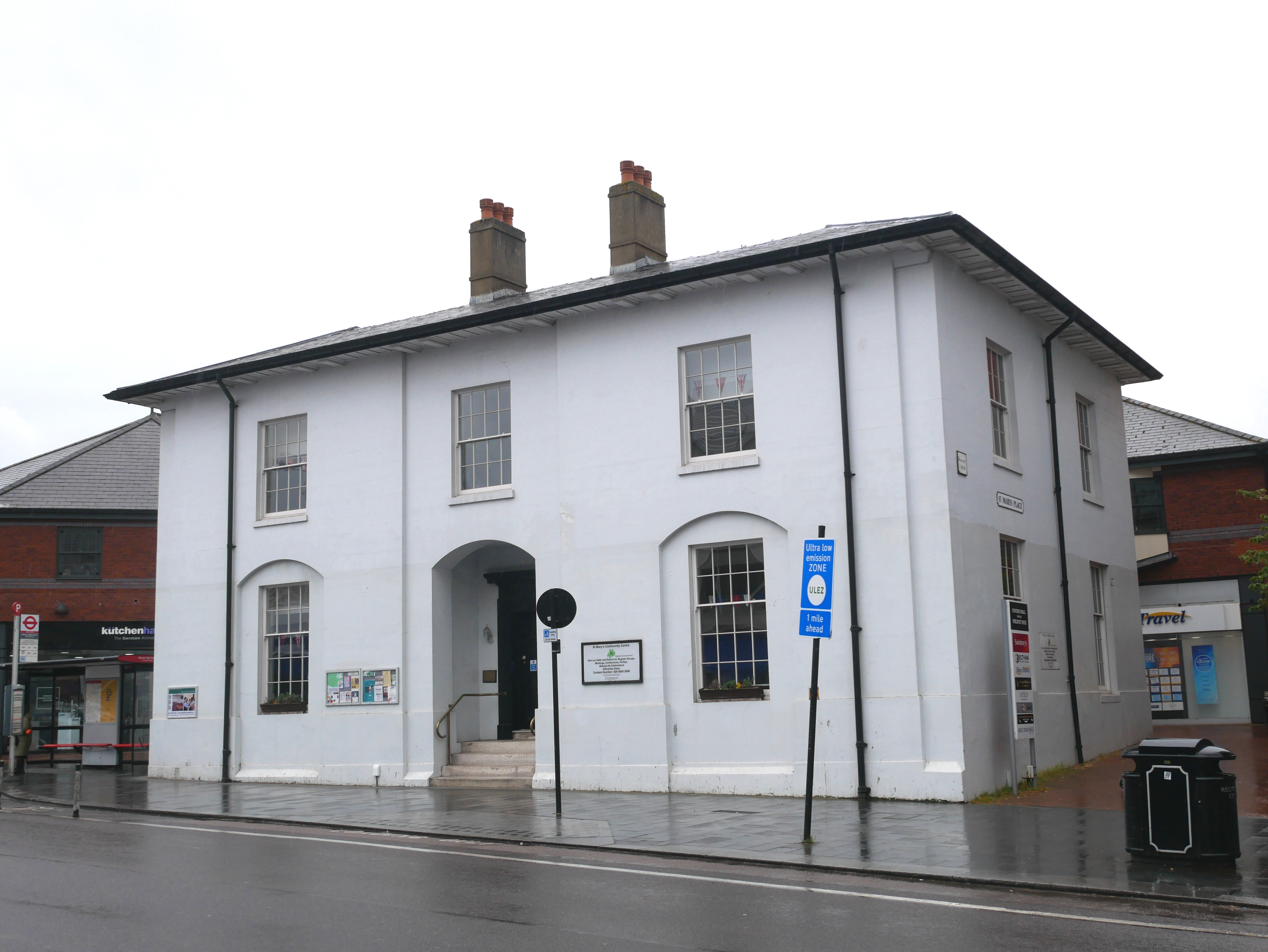
St. Mary's Community Centre, a Grade II listed building

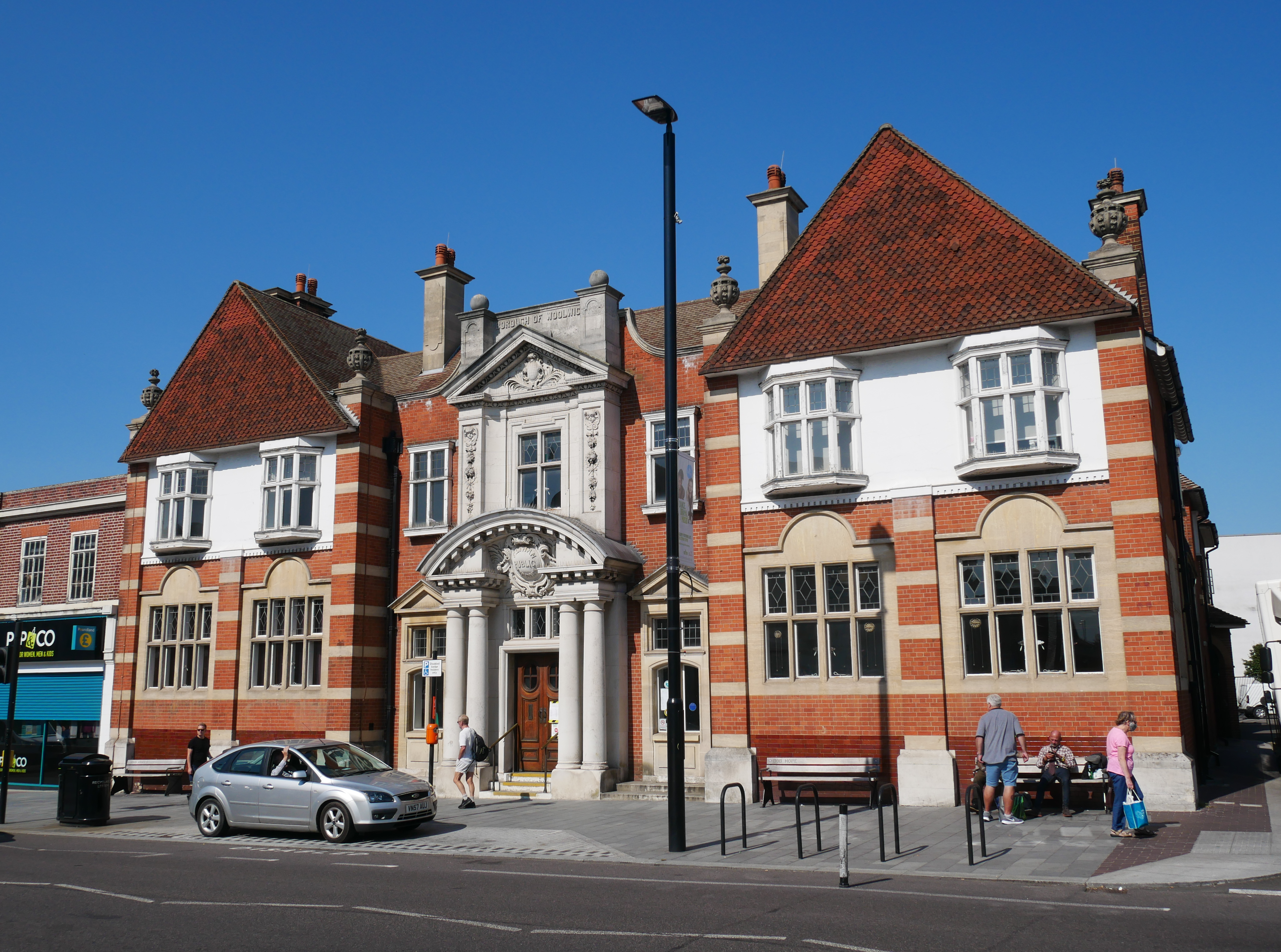
Eltham Library

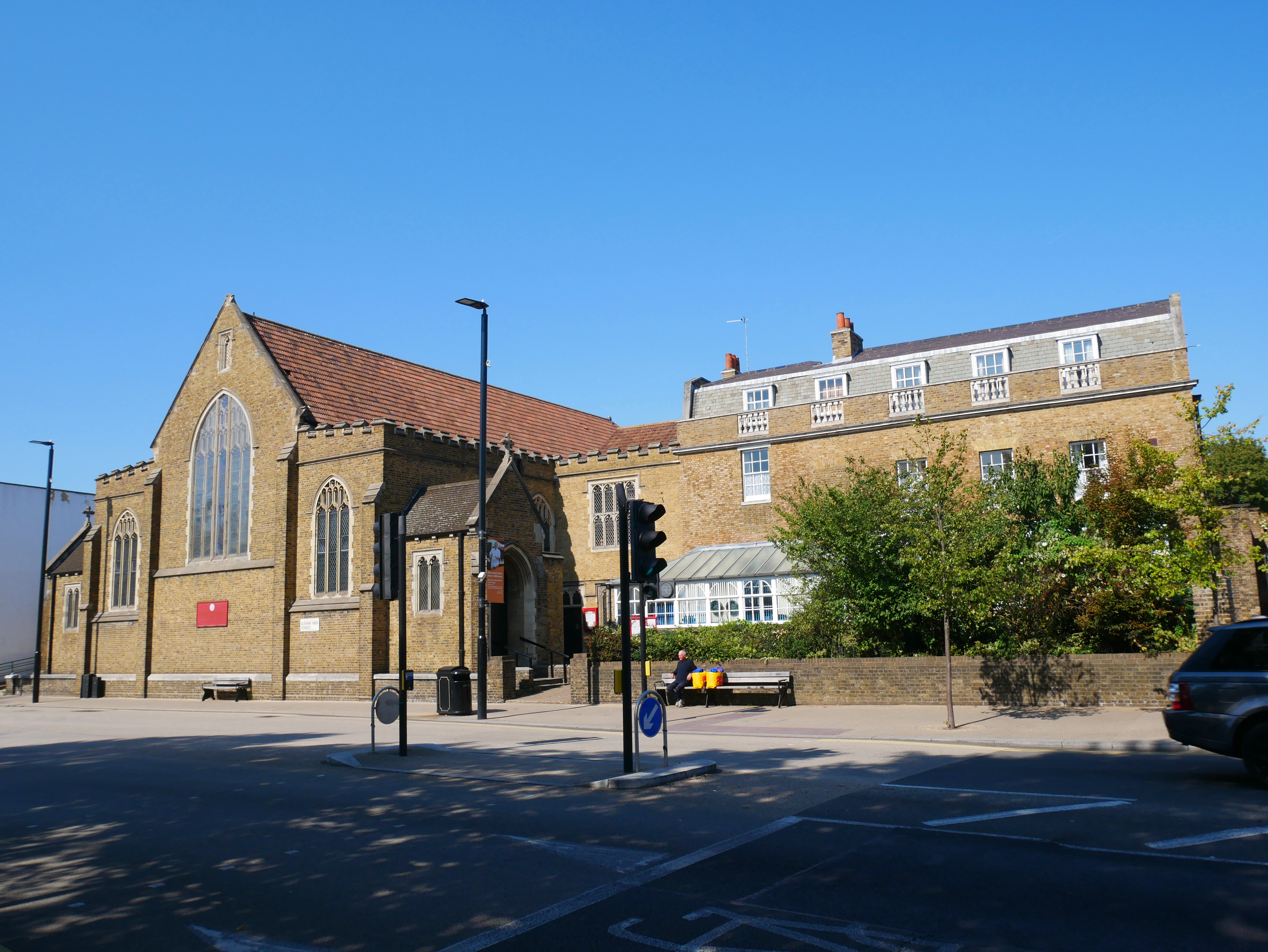
Christ Church (RC) and Priory, a Grade II listed building

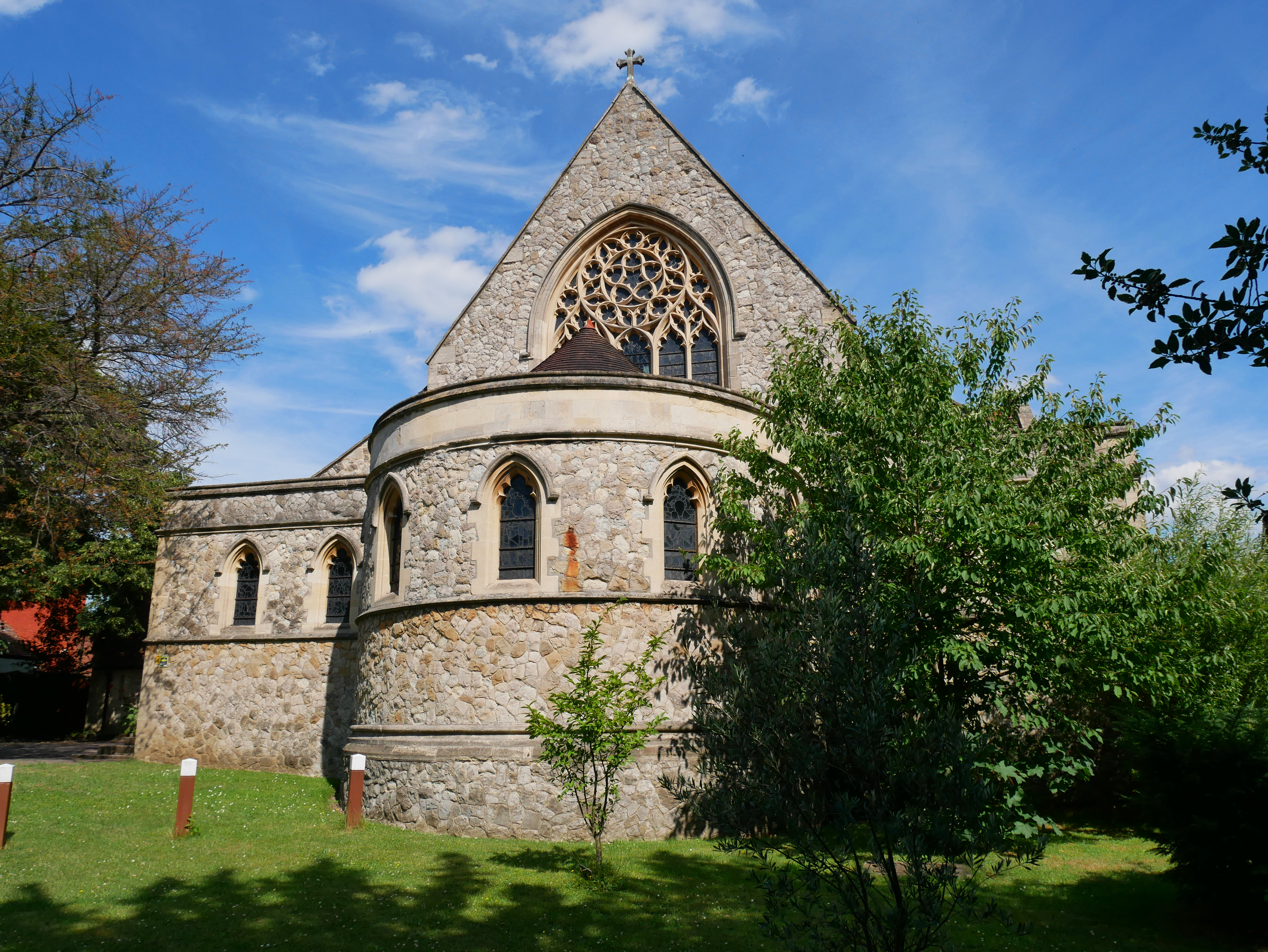
The Church of Holy Trinity, a Grade II listed building

On 22 April 1993, 18-year-old black student Stephen Lawrence was fatally stabbed in Well Hall. The crime quickly became one of the most high-profile racially motivated murders in modern Britain. Five teenagers were later accused of his murder but the case was dropped due to a lack of evidence. In 2011 as a result of new evidence coming to light, Gary Dobson and David Norris stood trial for the murder of Stephen Lawrence. They were convicted on 3 January 2012.

Other instances of racial attacks were documented throughout the 1980s and 1990s, with Eltham compared to a "sundown town" a name used to describe communities in America's Deep South where black people were advised for their own safety to not be out in public after dark. Eltham was, for example, compared to Jasper, Texas.

During the 2011 England riots, Eltham received national attention when, for three nights, a vigilante group of 300–400 people occupied the centre of Eltham, saying they were protecting people and property from rioters. Extra police from other UK forces were sent to maintain order. The group gathered after rumours that Eltham would be the latest place to be hit by unrest. A small number claimed to be EDL members. BBC reporters tracked fans of Millwall and Charlton walking along Eltham High St, with riot police following at a distance. Police were forced to move the crowds on for fear of violence, and were involved in minor clashes, but Eltham did not have any riot damage.

== Education ==
Primary schools in Eltham include: Alderwood, Christ Church (Shooters Hill Rd), Deansfield, Gordon, Middle Park, Ealdham, Eltham C of E (Founded 1814), Gordon, Haimo, Henwick, Kidbrooke Park, St Mary's, St Thomas More and Wingfield.

Secondary schools in Eltham include Harris Academy Greenwich, St Thomas More Catholic School, Eltham Hill School for Girls, and Stationers' Crown Woods Academy (built upon the land of King Henry VIII's hunting grounds, and until 2011 named Crown Woods School).

One campus of the University of Greenwich was in Avery Hill Park, on the borders of Eltham and New Eltham, but has closed.

== Sport and leisure ==
In 1654, three men were prosecuted at Eltham for playing cricket on a Sunday, one of the sport's earliest references.

Eltham Cricket Club, founded in 1863 and the last club for whom WG Grace played, are based at Footscray Rugby Club.

Eltham has a Non-League football club Cray Valley Paper Mills F.C., which plays at Badgers Sports Ground (shared with Greenwich Borough F.C.) in Middle Park. Cray Valley plays an annual charity match against their local non-league rivals Eltham Old Boys Football Club.

Eltham's parks provide many facilities for sports and fitness. Eltham Park South has a jogging track and six tennis courts. The Pleasaunce has a bowling green and pavilion. Avery Hill Park has changing rooms and half a dozen football and rugby pitches and with cricket pitches laid out in the summer. The land adjoining Avery Hill is occupied by many sports grounds which include Footscray RUFC, London Electricity Sorts and Social Club, Charlton Park RFC, Sparrows Lane Sports Ground, Cambridge Mission Sports Ground, Unilever Sports Ground, Metrogas Amateur Sports Association, St James Mar Thoma Amateur Sports Ground and the SRC2 Sports Club. The same area is also home to the training ground of professional football club Charlton Athletic at Sparrows Lane.

Adjacent to Well Hall Pleasaunce is University of Greenwich Athletics Ground. This has a pavilion with changing rooms and six pitches for football and rugby

Preserving these sports areas from the encroachments of property developers is a constant battle for Elthams environmental and community groups. Currently (2014) the focus is on the long disused Gaelic Sports Field in Avery Hill Road, for which there is a planning application to build 150 houses.

== Transport ==
=== Rail ===
Eltham, along with most other suburbs in south east London, is not served by the London Underground. Commuters rely on two rail lines to central London, and the road network. Trains through Eltham terminate at London Charing Cross, London Cannon Street or London Victoria in a westerly direction, and Crayford, Dartford, Slade Green, Gravesend, Gillingham or Rochester in an easterly direction. Given the lack of London Underground access, the two suburban rail lines work at, or above, their capacity during peak-hour commuting to central London. Fast trains take as little as 20 minutes to get to London Charing Cross. Eltham's closest London Underground station is North Greenwich tube station, a few miles to the northwest.

Bexleyheath line

Originally opened on 1 May 1895 by a private company, the Bexleyheath Line was taken over by the South Eastern Railway after it suffered bankruptcy. There were originally two stations in Eltham: Eltham Well Hall and Eltham Park. Eltham Well Hall station opened in 1895. Eltham Park station opened (after a prolonged legal wrangle) on 1 July 1908. On 11 June 1972, a London-bound train came off the track at Well Hall, killing 6 and injuring 126. Both Eltham stations were closed in 1985 and replaced by a new ‘Eltham’ station; this coincided with the construction of the Rochester Way Relief Road part of which was built on the site of Eltham Well Hall station. Glenlea Road between Well Hall Road and Archery Road was replaced by the station forecourt and a bus station (this had previously been adjacent to Well Hall station). The new rail station was built above the new road at the point it travels through what is sometimes referred to as 'the Eltham tunnel'. The new station has a modernist feel.

Dartford Loop

The Dartford Loop line, about 1 kilometre (0.6 mi) south of Eltham High Street, was opened by the South Eastern Railway on 1 September 1866. It is commonly known by locals as the 'Dartford line via Sidcup'. There are two stations on this line that serve the population living to the south of Eltham: Mottingham station, originally named 'Eltham Station' until 'Eltham Well Hall' opened, and New Eltham station. Neither station is as large as Eltham station, but both have been heavily upgraded since opening.

=== Roads ===
Eltham High Street lies on the A210, the original A20 London to Maidstone road. But the A20 has now been diverted southwards, passing through Mottingham, and it is a dual carriageway that connects to the M20 motorway in Kent. Similarly, to the north, the dual carriageway A2 has replaced the Rochester Road section, which was always very congested (the old road had dangerous readings of lead pollution, close to schools, before the advent of lead-free petrol).

The upgrading of these two arterial routes in and out of London means that Eltham is handily positioned between the A20 and A2. Driving on either of these roads into London soon results in congestion, although the A2 does connect through to the Blackwall Tunnel under the Thames, and thus into east London, all on dual carriageway. Driving eastwards allows access to the Dartford Tunnel, and the Kent countryside, in as little as 20 minutes in off-peak hours.

Crossing the two from north to the south is the A205 South Circular road, a busy arterial route.

The back streets of Eltham have been largely traffic-calmed by the local Council, but there are chronic rat-runs as many of the measures are ineffective or insufficient. Provision for cyclists is modest, while there are some interesting footpaths along ancient rights of way, for example in Oxleas Wood and Avery Hill Park.

=== Buses ===
Scheduled coaches, marketed as part of the National Express network, link Eltham Green to Pimlico and Victoria in central London and to several destinations on the Kent coast via Bluewater (a retail-based development on a grand scale in Dartford borough) and Canterbury. Eltham Green is one of the few places in south London served by National Express coaches.

Eltham is served by Transport for London bus routes 122, 124, 126, 132, 160, 161, 162, 233, 286, 314, 321, B15 and B16. These routes connect Eltham to Beckenham, Bexley, Bexleyheath, Blackfen, Bromley, Catford, Charlton, Chinbrook, Chislehurst, Crystal Palace, Foots Cray, Greenwich, Grove Park, Horn Park, Kidbrooke, Lee, Lewisham, Middle Park, New Addington, New Cross, North Greenwich, Plumstead, Ruxley, Sidcup, Swanley, Well Hall, Welling and Woolwich.

== Notable residents ==
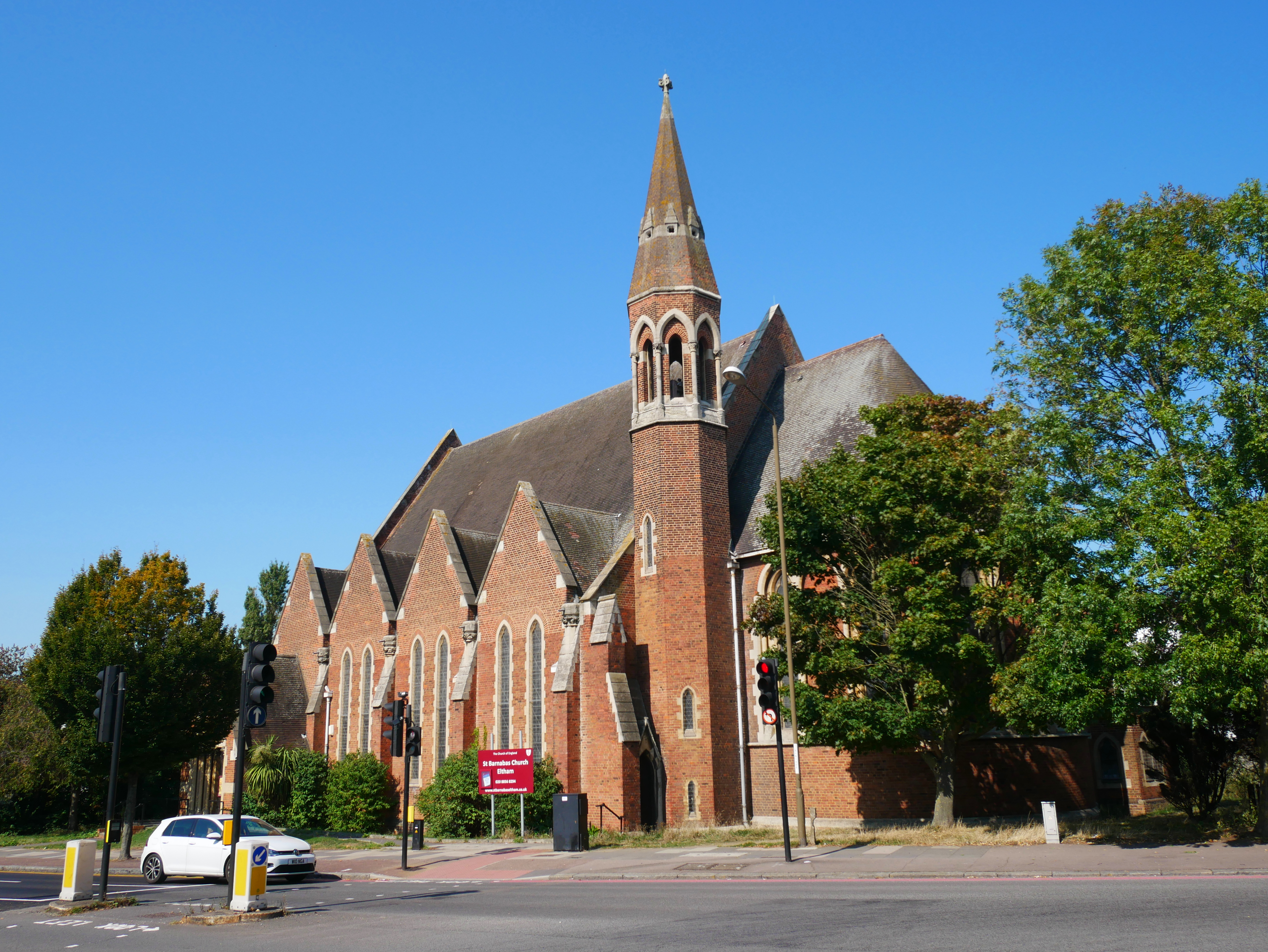
The Church of Saint Barnabas in Eltham; built in the 19th century, it was moved to its current location in the 1930s.

- John Arnold – Internationally renowned watchmaker; lived in Well Hall House
- John Ayldon – An operatic bass-baritone and former member of the D'Oyly Carte Opera Company
- Hubert Bland – Socialist and co-founder of the Fabian Society; lived in Well Hall House from 1899 to 1922
- Billy Bonds, MBE – Former Charlton Athletic and West Ham United footballer and former Millwall F.C. manager
- Bridget of York – Princess, seventh daughter of Edward IV
- Kate Bush – Singer and musician
- Mary Chandler, composer, oboist and pianist, born in Eltham
- Conflict – Anarcho-punk band, some of whose members originated in Eltham
- Stephen Courtauld – Millionaire, war veteran and philanthropist; lived at Eltham Palace from the mid-1930s to 1944
- Robert Devereux, 3rd Earl of Essex – Commander of the Parliamentary Army; last resident of Eltham Palace, where he died
- Bernardine Evaristo – Novelist, critic, poet, playwright and academic
- Boy George – Singer, raised in Middle Park, Eltham
- W. G. Grace – Cricketer
- Lord Healey (Denis Healey, Baron Healey) – Politician and Deputy Leader of the Labour Party, once lived in the Eltham "Hutments"
- Bob Hope, KBE – Actor and Hollywood film star, born in Eltham in 1903 (blue plaque at 44, Craigton Road). In 1982, the Eltham Little Theatre was renamed The Bob Hope Theatre in his honour, following his donations that saved the theatre from closure.
- Jack Hope – Film and television producer; elder brother of Bob Hope
- Frankie Howerd – Comedian and comic actor, born in York, but moved to Eltham as a young child
- Peter Howitt – Actor and film director
- Commodore Sir William James – Naval commander; settled in Eltham at Park Farm Place in 1759 and is commemorated by Severndroog Castle on nearby Shooter's Hill
- James Jameson – British Army Surgeon-General; lived in Eltham and died at his home, Newlands, in September 1904
- Richard Jefferies – Naturalist and writer; blue plaque at 59, Footscray Road
- John of Eltham, Earl of Cornwall – Prince of England
- Ruth Williams Khama – first lady of Botswana
- John Latham FRS (1740–1837) – medical doctor, naturalist and author
- Delroy Lindo – Actor
- E. V. Lucas – Writer
- J. M. A. Mills (1894–1986), English theosophist writer
- Sir Dermot Milman, 8th Baronet – Rugby union player and cricketer
- Herbert Morrison – Labour Cabinet minister and leader of London County Council; lived at 55, Archery Road (1929–1960)
- Edith Nesbit – Author, writer of The Railway Children and wife of Hubert Bland; lived in Well Hall House
- Ellis O'Reilly – Former Irish international gymnast and Olympian
- Katharine O'Shea – Mistress and later wife of Charles Stewart Parnell
- John Partridge – EastEnders actor
- Gavin Peacock – Former Charlton Athletic, Chelsea, and Queens Park Rangers footballer; former football pundit for the BBC
- Philippa Plantagenet, 5th Countess of Ulster
- Louise Redknapp – Singer
- Steve Peregrin Took – Musician
- Dudley Stamp, CBE – Geologist and geographer
- Alan White – Former drummer of British rock band Oasis

== See also ==
- Eltham railway station

== Bibliography ==
- Bowen, Rowland (1970). Cricket: A History of its Growth and Development. Eyre & Spottiswoode.
- Kennet, John. Eltham - a Pictorial History. (1995). Philimore and Co ISBN 1-86077-004-5.
- Lysons, Daniel. (1796) The Environs of London. Vol 4. Pages 394–421."Eltham"
