= Horn Park (park) =

Park in London, England

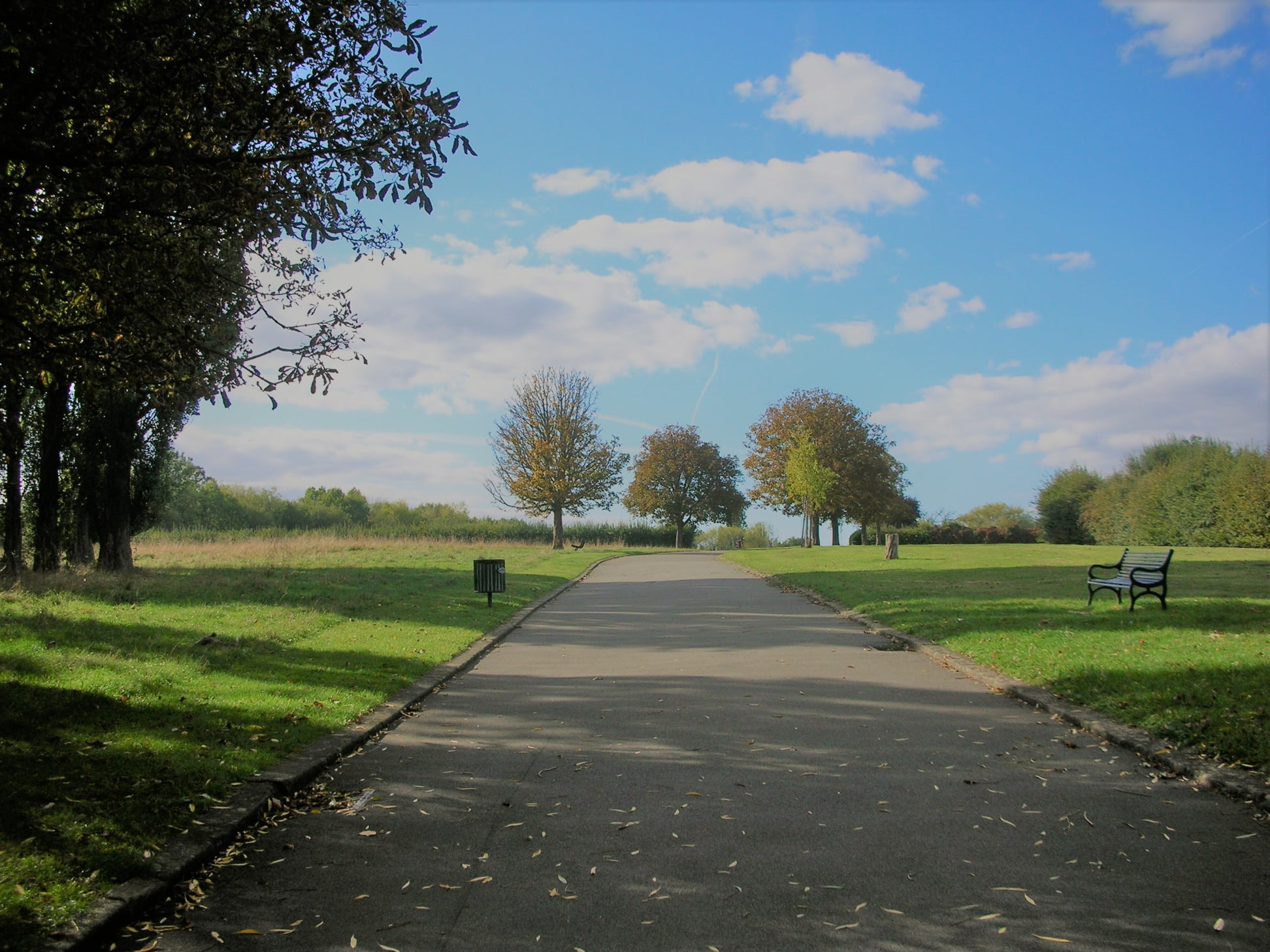
- Horn Park December 2011, looking west, along Gavestone Crescent

- Location within Royal Borough of Greenwich
- Type: Public park
- Location: Horn Park in the Royal Borough of Greenwich, United Kingdom
- Coordinates: 51.443°N 0.026°E
- Area: 16 acres (6.5 ha)
- Created: c.1940s
- Owner: Royal Borough of Greenwich
- Open: 06:00-20:00 or 24 hours
- Status: Open all year
- Awards: Green Flag Award 2012-2021
- Public transit: buses: 273, B15, 160, 261, Lee railway station
- Website: Horn Park at www.royalgreenwich.gov.uk

Horn Park is a 16 acres (6.5 ha) public park within Horn Park in the Eltham area of the Royal Borough of Greenwich, southeast London, United Kingdom. It has a mixture of grassland and woodland, children's playground, football pitch, outdoor gym and the first skate park in the Royal Borough of Greenwich. Historically Horn Park was one of three deer hunting parks belonging to Eltham Palace, over the centuries it was also used as grazing farmland and a fruit orchard. The park today is some of the last remaining open space of the original park, a public park next to the Horn Park housing estate which was completed just after the Second World War.

== Name ==
The area the park now occupies was previously the southern part of the Horn Park, one of three parks belonging to Eltham Manor, later called Eltham Palace. The historic Horn Park was also known as West Horne and Lee Park; it was the westernmost of Eltham Manor's parks, and slightly closer to Lee, than Eltham. It had also been recorded as Home Park. The Horn part of the name is thought to come from Old English, meaning "a projecting horn shaped piece of land" and Saxon Horne, meaning corner, as it formed a projecting bulge on the edge of the Eltham parish. The area and the public park are both identically named Horn Park. The direction sign outside the park at the junction of Gavestone Crescent and Alnwick Road, says Horn Park Local Park and Recreation Ground, probably to simply distinguish the park from the area, as the shops and community centre of Horn Park are in the opposite direction. The park is simply named Horn Park on maps which name it, also on the Royal Borough of Greenwich website for the park, and on the signs inside the park.

== Description ==
Horn Park is a public park, within Horn Park in the Eltham area of the Royal Borough of Greenwich. It is 530 m (580 yd) long east to west, and 120 m (130 yd) across north to south, but widens to about 180 m (200 yd) across at the eastern side, to give the park a total area of 16 acres (6.5 ha). It contains an outdoor gym, a playground, a floodlit multi-use game court and a skate park, the first skate park to be constructed in the Royal Borough of Greenwich. Horn Park is on a hill, the eastern edge of the park has a height of about 32 m (105 ft) above sea level, which rises to around a height 50 m (160 ft) on the west side of the park, giving views of the surrounding area.

The paved road, Gavestone Crescent enters Horn Park at the northwest gate and gently curves around the northern side of the park and exits the northern gate, it is usually gated off to vehicles but serves as a wide paved path to pedestrian, cyclists and wheelchair users. The majority of Horn Park's green space is south of Gavestone Crescent. Much of Horn Park's area is maintained short grass, although some patches are left to grow for wildlife. The western corner of the park is woodland, the eastern third of the park has small patches of trees and bushes, and a thin strip of trees follows the southern boundary of the park. There are some paved footpaths that curve across the east side of Horn Park amongst the trees that connect to the different entrance gates, and many unpaved paths including one that follows the southern edge of the park. There are many benches in the park close to the paved paths, plus many bins, dog waste bins and information signs too, there is also a large hedge just to the west of the centre, that almost cuts the park in two running from Gavestone Crescent to the southern fence.

On the northwest side of Horn Park, north of Gavestone Crescent along the northern fence next to Horn Park Primary School, is the paved playground area of the park. This contains a fenced playground for small children, with equipment such as, a climbing frame with a slide, roundabout and swings, and a fenced playground designed for older children, with a zip line, and bigger swings and climbing frames, there are also picnic tables inside the playgrounds. To the east of the playground is a fenced, floodlit multipurpose game court, then next to that is the skate park, with numerous wooden quarter pipes, ramps and rails atop tarmac; Horn Park's skate park was the first to be constructed in the Royal Borough of Greenwich. Opposite the playground on the south side of Gavestone Crescent is an outdoor gym with nine pieces of equipment for people to use, and bicycle locking bars; south of here on the west side of the main field is a full size football pitch with goal posts.

== Location ==
Horn Park is located in Horn Park with which it shares its name, in the Eltham area of the Royal Borough of Greenwich, in southeast London, United Kingdom. Horn Park is very close to the borough boundary, the London Borough of Lewisham is within 70 m (77 yd) to the south and west of the park and almost touches the park's west corner, while the London Borough of Bromley, is around 90 m (98 yd) to the east of Horn Park. The park is around 400 m (440 yd) south of the shops and community hall of Horn Park; Middle Park is only 0.8 km (0.50 mi) northeast, and Eltham beyond there at 1.8 km (1.1 mi) from the park. Other nearby places are Grove Park and Chinbrook 1.2 km (0.75 mi) to the south, Lee Green 1.5 km (0.93 mi) to the northwest, and Mottingham 1.5 km (0.93 mi) to the east. There are no bodies of water inside Horn Park, although 80 m (87 yd) east of the park the River Quaggy flows past in a northern direction. Although within the Eltham area of Royal Borough of Greenwich, Horn Park is not included in SE9 postcode area like the rest of Eltham, but is in the SE12 post code area, which is the Lee district.

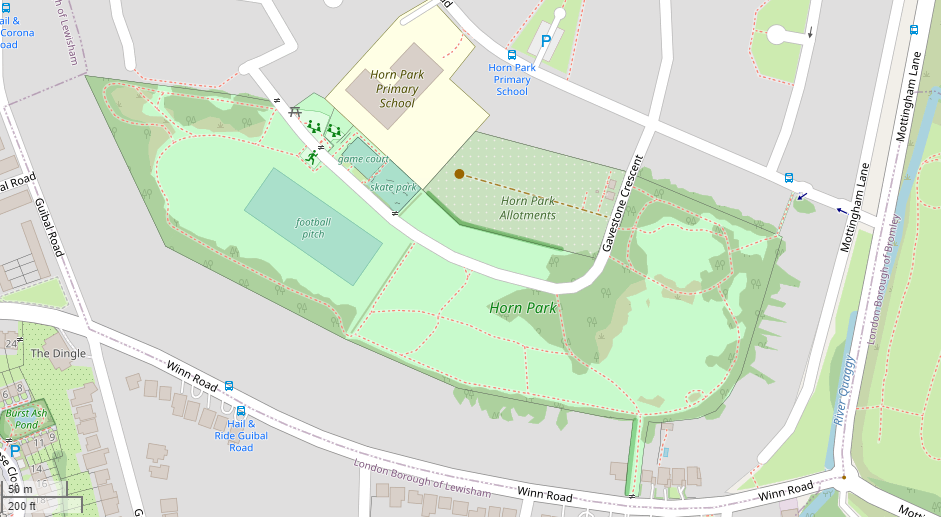
Map of Horn Park and surrounding area as it appears on OpenStreetMap

=== Boundaries ===
Most of Horn Park's boundaries are with the gardens of the surrounding minor residential roads. The park's southern boundary is a wooden fence approximately 450 m (490 yd) separating the park from the back gardens of houses on Winn Road. The western wooden fence is around 150 m (160 yd) long and backs onto gardens on Guibal Road, whilst the eastern fence is around the same length and separates Horn Park from the back gardens of houses on Motingham Lane. The Northern fence separates the park from residential roads of Alnwick Road on the east side and Gavestone Road on the west side, whilst the centre of the northern boundary is a chain link fence separating the park from the grounds of Horn Park Primary School, and some gardening allotments.

There are five entrance gates to Horn Park. The southern entrance gate from Winn Road, joins a foot path between two houses of Winn Road before coming to the main field of the park. The northwest corner of Horn Park has a footpath passing through a gate to Gavestone Road, and the northeast corner has a footpath joining a gate on Alnwick Road, between two houses. Next to the allotments, there is a vehicle gate, where Gavestone Crescent enters the park, this gate is locked to the public vehicles, and is usually only used for maintenance and emergency access, although there is pedestrian access around the gate, and a separate pedestrian gate close by to the vehicle gate.

=== Transport ===
The surrounding roads, Winn Road, Alnwick Road, Gavestone Road and Gavestone Crescent are all minor residential roads. The closest A roads to Horn Park are, Sidcup Road 180 m (200 yd) to the northeast, a dual carriageway and part of the A20 road. Westhorne Avenue, another dual carriageway, and part of the London's South Circular Road, passes by around 350 m (380 yd) to the north, and Baring Road, part of the A2212 road is about 470 m (510 yd) to the west. Within 500 m (550 yd) are the routes of four London Buses connecting Horn Park to Lewisham, Bromley, Lee Green, Grove Park, Eltham, Catford, Welling, Bexleyheath, Middle Park, Sidcup, Locksbottom and other places. The 273 bus travels past Horn Park's Winn Road gate on it journey from Lewisham to Petts Wood, While the B15 bus serves Alnwick Road where the park's northern gate is located whilst travelling from Horn Park to Bexleyheath. The 160 bus also serves Westhorne Avenue north of Horn Park on its journey from Catford to Sidcup, and the 261 bus travels from Lewisham to Locksbottom along Baring Road to the west. The closest railway station, is Lee railway station, on the Dartford Loop Line about 900 m (980 yd) northwest of Horn Park.

== History ==
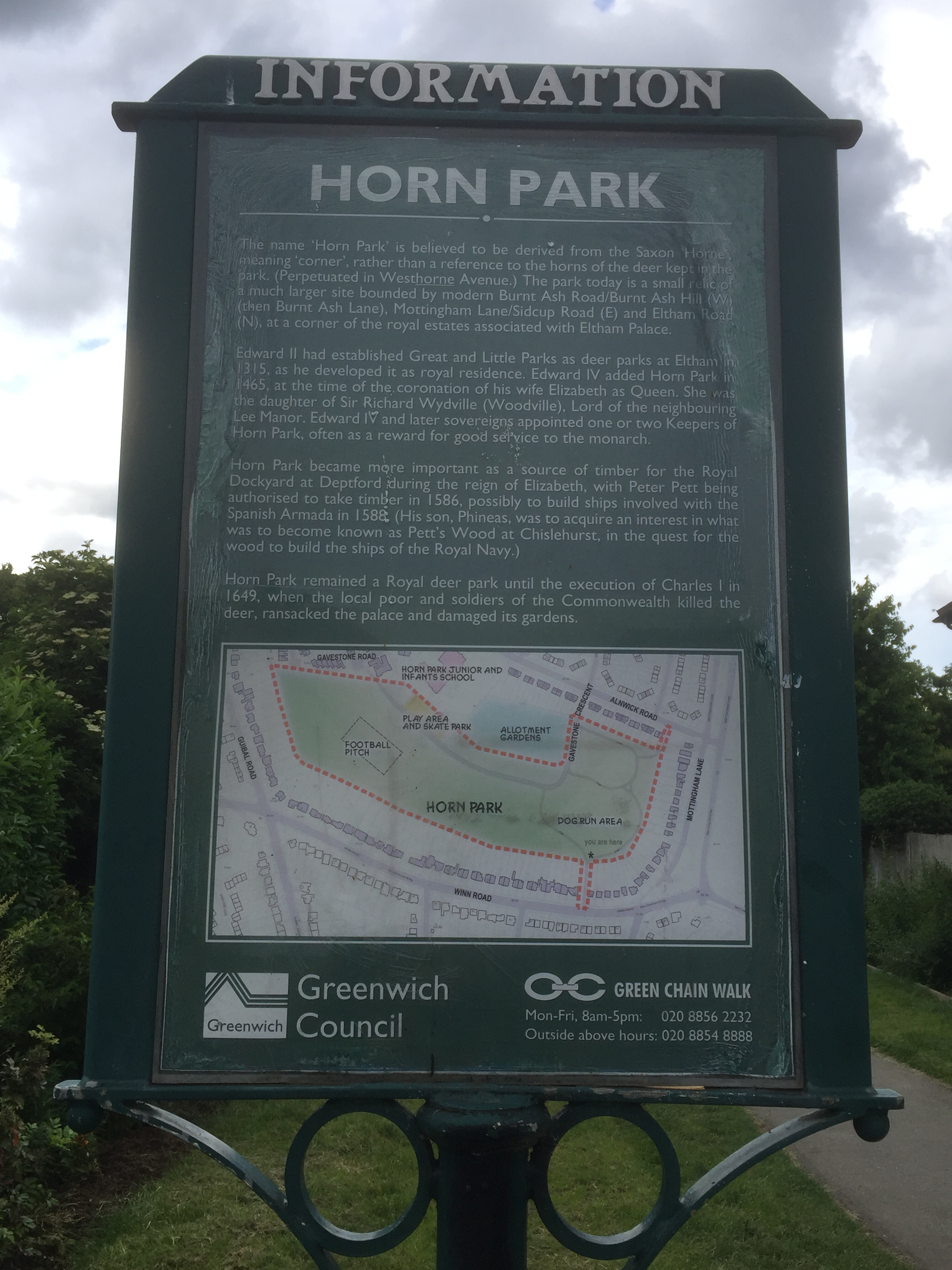
Map and history of Horn Park on information sign by entrance gate

The area the park now occupies was previously the southern part of the Horn Park, one of three parks belonging to Eltham Manor, later called Eltham Palace. During the reign of William the Conqueror, the estate of Eltham Manor was recorded to belonging to Odo of Bayeux. During the following centuries, the ownership of Eltham Manor fell in and out of Crown ownership several times. The land belonged to John de Vesci then William de Vesci in the 13th century followed by Gilbert de Aton, 1st Baron Aton and Geoffrey le Scrope in the 14th century. In 1465 King Edward VI established Horn Park as a royal deer hunting park, the other two Eltham parks already having been made into deer parks by Edward II 150 years earlier in 1315. By 1481 Horn Park was an enclosed park 345 acres (140 ha) in size and consisted of a moated lodge, with a dairy, barn, stable and orchard. Horn Park was also leased by Henry Guildford and Sir John Gates in the 16th century, then in 1586, Peter Pett was authorised to use timber from the park for building ships at Deptford Dockyard.

In the mid 17th century Edward Sackville, 4th Earl of Dorset was in charge of the land until the English Civil War when Charles I was captured in 1648, and Rich the rebel with commonwealth soldiers and common people sacked Eltham Palace, destroyed the parks and killed the deer, ending their use as deer parks. After Charles I was executed in 1649, Horn Park came into the possession of Thomas Walsingham followed by Sir John Shaw, 1st Baronet in 1663.

At the end of the 17th century the estate was turned to arable land, meadow and pasture, then in 1860, Horn Park Farm was owned by a silk merchant named Thomas Blenkiron, and the land was used to graze race horses. In the early 19th century, Horn Park was a fruit farm, the farmhouse stood north of the present day recreation ground, where the junction of Alnwick Road and Horncastle Road is now located, orchards were planted on the land. In the 1930s development began in the northern parts of the Horn Park farmland laying out the first residential streets, then in 1936 Woolwich council cleared most of the orchard to begin building Horn Park housing estate starting with 198 houses. Construction was put on hold due to the Second World War, but the estate was finished after the war and consisted of 1,100 homes, and Horn Park Primary School was also built in 1949.

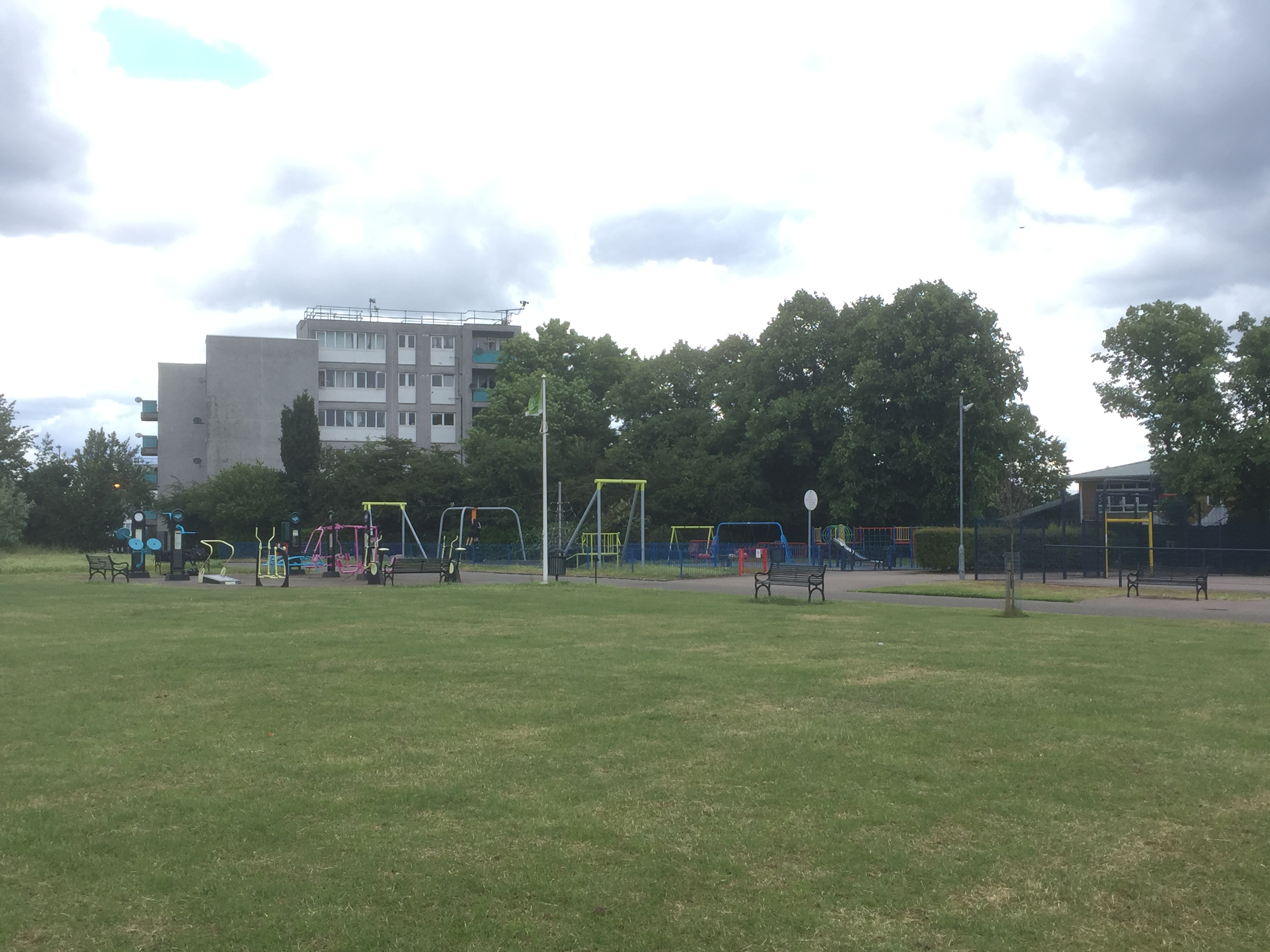
Horn Park's outdoor gym was installed in 2009 and the current playground was constructed in 2016. The flag was erected after the park won the Green Flag Award from 2012 onwards

In the late 1940s Gaveston Crescent was laid down as a new street with prefab houses all the way along it on both sides, leaving the last bit of open land to the south of the new Horn Park estate only 50 m (55 yd) across. The last section of the orchard still remained, north west of the current park, this was cleared and turned into houses and flats of Gaveston Crescent. In 1968 the prefab houses of Gaveston Crescent were torn down and turned back into open land, making the park its current size of 16 acres (6.5 ha), and 120 m (130 yd) across. The children's playground was constructed on the site of some of the former prefabs and the paved road surface of Gaveston Crescent itself was left running through the park as a large footpath, and still appears named on maps, despite having no houses and not being accessible by vehicle. In January 2003 a newly constructed skate park was open to the public, and was the first skate park in the Royal Borough of Greenwich. A local chairwoman, Frances Walker, raised £50,000 for outdoor gym equipment to be installed in Horn Park, shortly before she died April 2009 aged 69; the outdoor gym was installed in 2009, and a memorial sign with Walker's name and photograph was erected next to it.

The current playground in Horn Park was constructed in 2016; the playground has been rebuilt several times since its first appearance, but has always occupied roughly the same spot adjacent to Horn Park Primary School which itself was rebuilt in 1970. There was previously a brick building on the north side of Gaveston Crescent near the playground, that was used to serve food and drink when events were being held in the park, but it was demolished in the early 2000s. Horn Park has won the Green Flag Award several times between 2012 and 2021 The flag celebrating this was erected next to the outdoor gym.

=== History of administration ===
Historically, Horn Park and Eltham Manor were part of the Eltham Parish, within the Hundred of Blackheath, in the Lathe of Sutton at Hone, west division of Kent In 1889 the County of London was created, Horn Park ceased being in Kent and was included in the new county, then after the London Government Act 1899, The County of London was split into boroughs in 1900, Horn Park became part of the newly created Metropolitan Borough of Woolwich. In turn, after the London Government Act 1963, the County of London was abolished and replaced with the larger Greater London in 1965. Horn Park was then included within the London Borough of Greenwich which was created that year, and remains to the present, renamed Royal Borough of Greenwich in 2012. In the past there was an electoral ward named Horn Park which covered the park and housing estate, but not today, now they are included in a larger ward named Middle Park and Sutcliffe.
