= Grove Park Cemetery =

Cemetery in Lewisham, London

Coordinates: 51.425°N 0.036°E

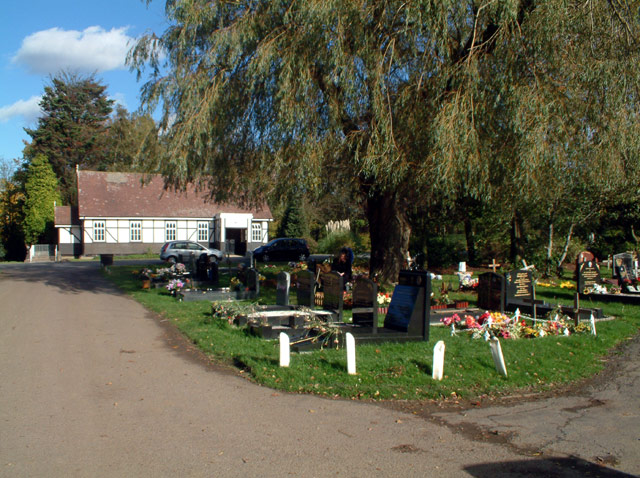
- Grove Park Cemetery
- Interactive map of Grove Park Cemetery

Details
- Established: 1935; 91 years ago
- Location: Marvels Lane, Chinbrook, Grove Park SE12 9PU, London
- Country: England
- Owned by: Lewisham Council
- Find a Grave: Grove Park Cemetery

Grove Park Cemetery is a cemetery in Chinbrook, Grove Park in the London Borough of Lewisham, that opened in 1935.

== Location ==
It is located near Grove Park on Marvels Lane, between Chinbrook Meadows and Marvels Wood, SE12.

== Special interest ==
Grove Park Cemetery was listed by English Heritage in November 2003 as a landscape of special historic interest (Grade II). The park has a special carefully planned lay out, specific for the 1930s. It contains 56 Commonwealth service war graves of World War II; those whose graves are not marked by headstones are listed on a Screen Wall memorial in the war graves plot in the centre of the cemetery.
