= Downham, London =

District of south-east London, England

Coordinates: 51.4257°N 0.0058°E

Downham
- Location within Greater London
- Population: 14,567 (2011 Census. Lewisham Ward)
- OS grid reference: TQ395715
  - Charing Cross: 8 mi (12.9 km) NW
- London borough: Lewisham; Bromley
- Ceremonial county: Greater London
- Region: London
- Country: England
- Sovereign state: United Kingdom
- Post town: BROMLEY
- Postcode district: BR1
- Post town: LONDON
- Postcode district: SE6
- Dialling code: 020
- Police: Metropolitan
- Fire: London
- Ambulance: London
- UK Parliament: Lewisham East
- London Assembly: Greenwich and Lewisham; Bexley and Bromley

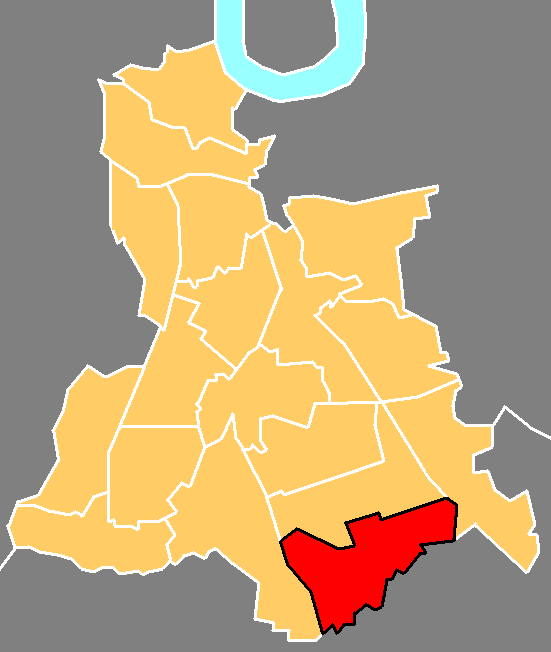
The ward of Downham (red) shown within the London Borough of Lewisham(yellow)

Downham is a district of South East London, England, primarily within the London Borough of Lewisham. Downham is located south of Lewisham and borders north London Borough of Bromley.

Downham was named in honour of Lord Downham, who was chairman of the London County Council between 1919 and 1920.

The Prime Meridian passes just to the west of Downham.

British Film-maker Luna Carmoon was raised in the area and made her first two shorts and her debut feature Hoard in the area. She refers to them as her Downham Trilogy'.

== History ==
=== Origins of the Downham Estate ===
Before 1920, the area had no houses, apart from a shooting range close to Rangefield Road and areas of farmland in the period around 1890. Some belonged to Holloway Farm and others to Shroffolds Farm. Following the First World War, local boroughs like Deptford and Bermondsey as well as the London County Council [LCC] felt it was essential to reduce overcrowding by erecting more residential property and exceed that which was provided by private landlords. The final spur for the LCC to commence works in the area was the new law of 1923 that provided government funding to enable residential developments to be built by local governments. As a result, the Downham Estate was developed towards the end of the 1920s by the LCC.

=== Historic demography ===
The area of the estate was in the region of 522 acres (2.1 km^{2}), with 461 acres (1.9 km^{2}) in the Metropolitan Borough of Lewisham, (from 1965 the London Borough of Lewisham) and 61 acres (0.2 km^{2}) in the Municipal Borough of Bromley (from 1965 the London Borough of Bromley); the estate stretched for about 1.25 miles (2 km). Prior to this, most of the terrain was countryside. However, parts around Grove Park railway station to the east had already begun to experience some building works. In this territory, which was the then furthest extreme of London, 5659 homes of different sizes were built. 408 apartment complexes of four storeys were also erected.

At the time of development, the area was considered 'a showpiece, a cottage estate'. With less than 20 houses to an acre, and shops and abundant greenery, the area was of relatively low population density. An official Lewisham publication around 1930 considered Downham to be 'a Garden City'.

=== Downham estate in the 1920s ===
Those who were the first to live on the Downham estate late in the 1920s had mostly been relocated from certain less pleasant parts of the inner city like Rotherhithe and East London, and these new homes were of a much higher standard than their previous homes.

The arrival of new people in the Downham area led to some unexpected results. In 1926, residents of Alexandra Crescent (at that time, a private street in Bromley) appointed Albert Frampton, who had developed Alexandra Crescent, to build a dividing wall (the Downham Wall). Some private home owners in Bromley wanted to prevent the working class 'vulgar people' from the Downham estate from accessing the neighbouring middle-class area. They also wanted to prevent them from using this as an access route into the town centre of Bromley. Frampton made a formal application to Bromley Council on 16 February 1926 to build the dividing wall. The council refused to make a decision on the application, but the brick wall was built nonetheless across Valeswood Road at its junction with Alexandra Crescent and was known as a 'class wall'. It was seven feet high and was fortified at the top with broken pieces of glass.

That pre-war class wall was a stark reminder of the great increase in gated communities, barrier-walls and the use of private security by wealthier people in various parts of the growing metropolis.

The first Shopping Week took place in June 1929, and both the Downham Tavern and Splendid Super Cinema opened in 1930.

=== Downham estate from the 1930s to the 1950s ===
By the 1930s, lack of clarity had arisen in regard to responsibilities in relation to the dividing class wall following complaints by LCC to authorities at Lewisham Council. The Town Council of Bromley was firm in its decision not to take down the wall, and curiously neither the LCC nor Lewisham Council felt able to do it either. There were many arguments and controversies about this class wall for close to 25 years. Eventually Bromley Council removed it in 1950 by which time World War 2 had ended. Action was taken largely because passage routes were required for the fire engines.

Despite this minor glitch, the Downham Estate illustrates the nature of developments of council housing in Britain in the period between the first and second world wars. The Downham estate and other projects of this nature around the time (for example Becontree) were built in efforts to reduce the serious housing problem around the city. It was timely in the aftermath of the Second World War when much more housing was needed. The government felt the need to demonstrate the huge potential of public-sector home development especially as there was a need to de-slum and modernise the city. The central government also funded and subsidised such development project which were done in the name of the London County Council.

Among many new developments, Downham Health Clinic opened in Churchdown Road in 1932, Good Shepherd School opened in Moorside Road in 1933, Beckenham Place Park Recreation Area opened in 1936, and both the Downham Library and the Swimming Pool were opened to the public in June 1937.

== Geography ==
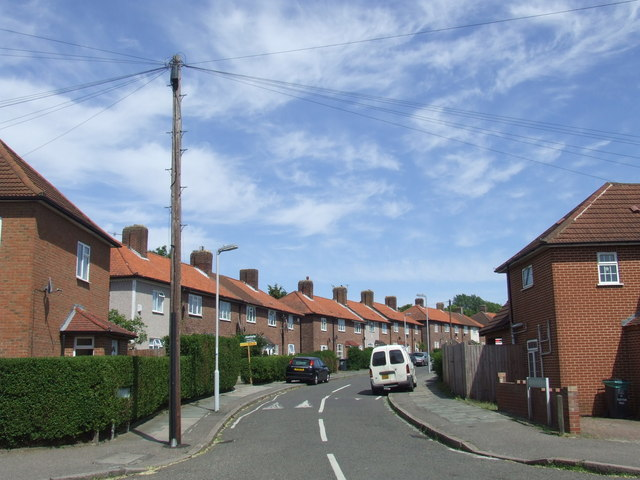
Downham Estate

Downham is bordered by Grove Park, Plaistow, Bromley Hill, Beckenham, Bellingham, Southend and Whitefoot. Green spaces in and close to Downham include Forster Memorial Park, Beckenham Place Park and Downham Fields. Whilst the area lost Woolworths and all its banks, new facilities include Downham Sports and Leisure Centre as well as a Tesco Local. Marks and Spencers now serves as the grocery shop at the BP station which stands on the spot where the 2244-seater Splendid Cinema was in the 1930s. A Quasar Laser tag is located at the south of Downham Way near the Bromley Court Hotel. Bonus Pastor Catholic College is located in Downham with two sites, Churchdown and Winlaton and has a large playing field at Whitefoot Lane with the Green Chain Walk running through.

Neighbourhood Renewal Unit and Lewisham Strategic Partnership have been implementing many projects in the area which include Housing and Environment, Health, Crime and Community Safety, Neighbourhood Management, Community Development, Children and Young People and Employment and Enterprise.

== Education ==
Downham has two secondary schools, Bonus Pastor Catholic College and Haberdashers' Knights Academy (formerly Malory School until 2005). Primary Schools include Launcelot Primary School, Downderry Primary School, Merlin Primary School (now also part of the academy), Good Shepherd Primary School, Rangefield Primary School, Burnt Ash Primary School and Pendragon Special School for students aged 11 to 16 years.

== Transport ==
=== Buses ===
- 136 to Elephant & Castle via Catford, Lewisham, New Cross & Peckham and to Grove Park
- 181 to Lewisham via Catford and to Grove Park
- 208 to Lewisham via Catford and to Orpington via Bromley & Petts Wood
- 320 to Catford and to Biggin Hill via Bromley
- 336 to Catford and to Locksbottom via Bromley
- N136 to Oxford Circus via Catford, Lewisham and Peckham and to Chislehurst via Grove Park (Night Service)
- N199 to Trafalgar Square via Catford, Lewisham and Greenwich and to St Mary Cray via Bromley and Orpington (Night Service)

=== Rail ===
The closest National Rail stations to Downham are Beckenham Hill (with services to London Blackfriars via Catford and to Sevenoaks via Bromley South & Swanley) and Grove Park (with services to London Charing Cross, London Cannon Street via Lewisham, Orpington, Sevenoaks and Bromley North).
