= River Ravensbourne =

Tributary of the Thames in south London

Coordinates: 51°28′55″N 0°01′01″W

Ravensbourne Deptford Creek
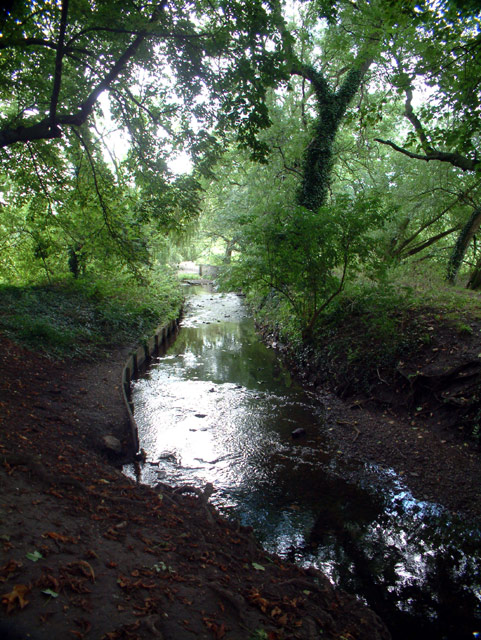
- The river in Bromley

Location
- Country: England
- London boroughs: London Borough of Bromley, London Borough of Lewisham, Royal Borough of Greenwich
- Towns: Bromley, Lewisham, Deptford

Physical characteristics
- Source: Keston
- Mouth: River Thames
  - location: Deptford
- Length: 17.4 km (10.8 mi)
- Basin size: 180 km^{2} (69 sq mi)
- Discharge
  - location: Catford Hill
  - average: 0.43 m^{3}/s (15 cu ft/s)
  - minimum: 0.09 m^{3}/s (3.2 cu ft/s)23 May 1992
  - maximum: 28.4 m^{3}/s (1,000 cu ft/s)9 June 1992
- Discharge
  - location: Bromley South
  - average: 0.05 m^{3}/s (1.8 cu ft/s)

Basin features
- Tributaries
  - left: Ravensbourne South Branch, Ravensbourne East Branch, Spring Brook, River Pool, River Quaggy

The River Ravensbourne is a tributary of the River Thames in south London, England. It flows north from near Bromley into the tidal River Thames at Deptford, where its tidal reach is known as Deptford Creek.

== Geography ==
The Ravensbourne is 11 miles (17 km) in length with a total catchment area of 180 km^{2}. It flows through the London Boroughs of Bromley, Lewisham and Greenwich.

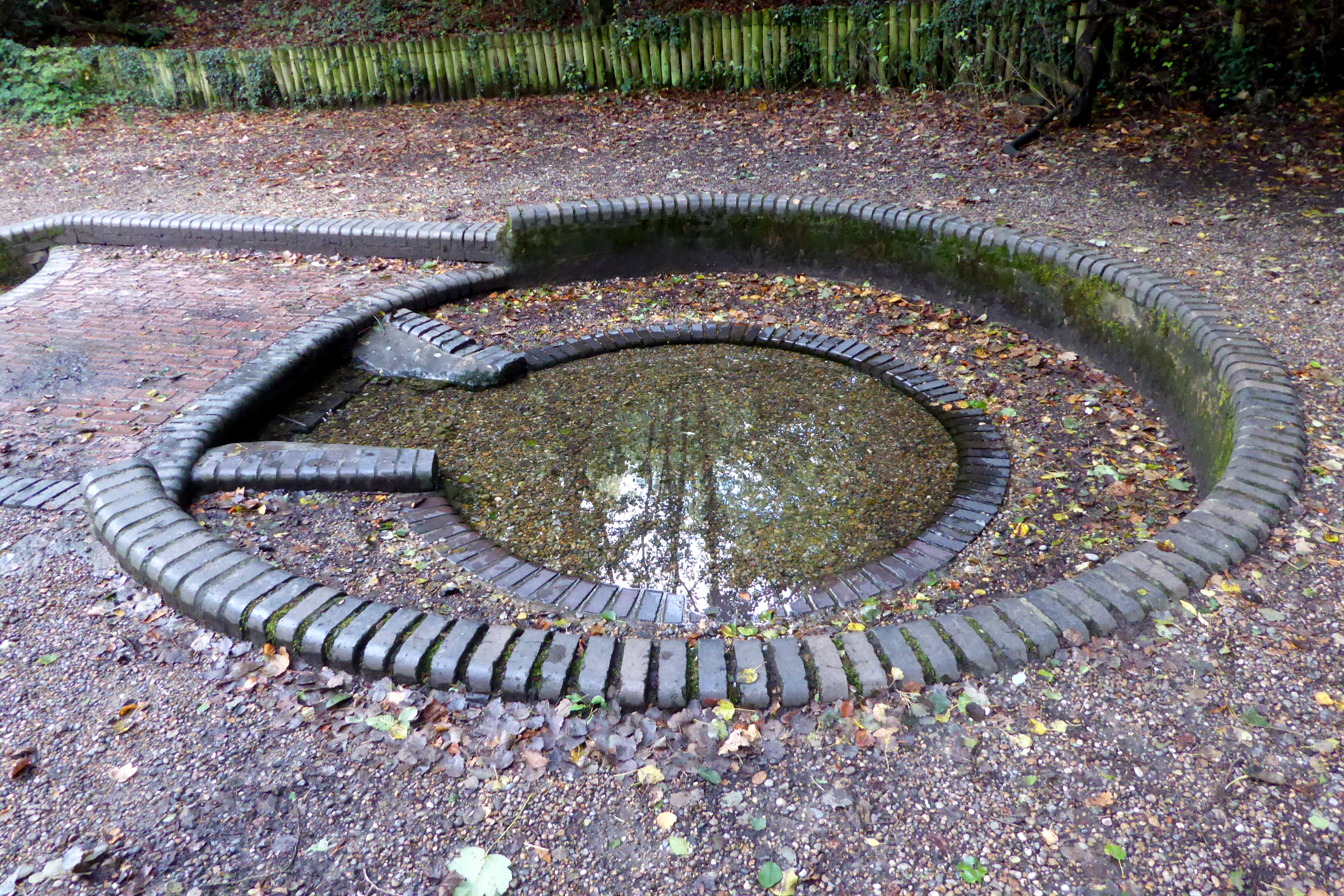
Caesar's Well on Keston Common, the source of the Ravensbourne

The Ravensbourne rises at Caesar's Well, Keston, four miles south of Bromley town centre, and flows initially in a northerly direction. For the initial third of its length, the river flows across common land (including Hayes Common and Bromley Common) until it reaches the southern outskirts of Bromley town. There it is joined by the Ravensbourne South Branch and the Ravensbourne East Branch, which substantially increase the flow.

The Ravensbourne then flows northwards alongside the A21, passing below Bromley town centre through Church Gardens and Glassmill Reservoir, then on into Beckenham Place Park, the last semi-natural reach of the river. Further north, it passes through Ladywell Fields, where there has been considerable restoration work since 2007/08, with the removal of a long stretch of 1980s concrete channeling, re-routing to more closely match its natural course, and the introduction of terraces and submerged aquatic vegetation (SAV) to provide animal habitat and improve flood control.

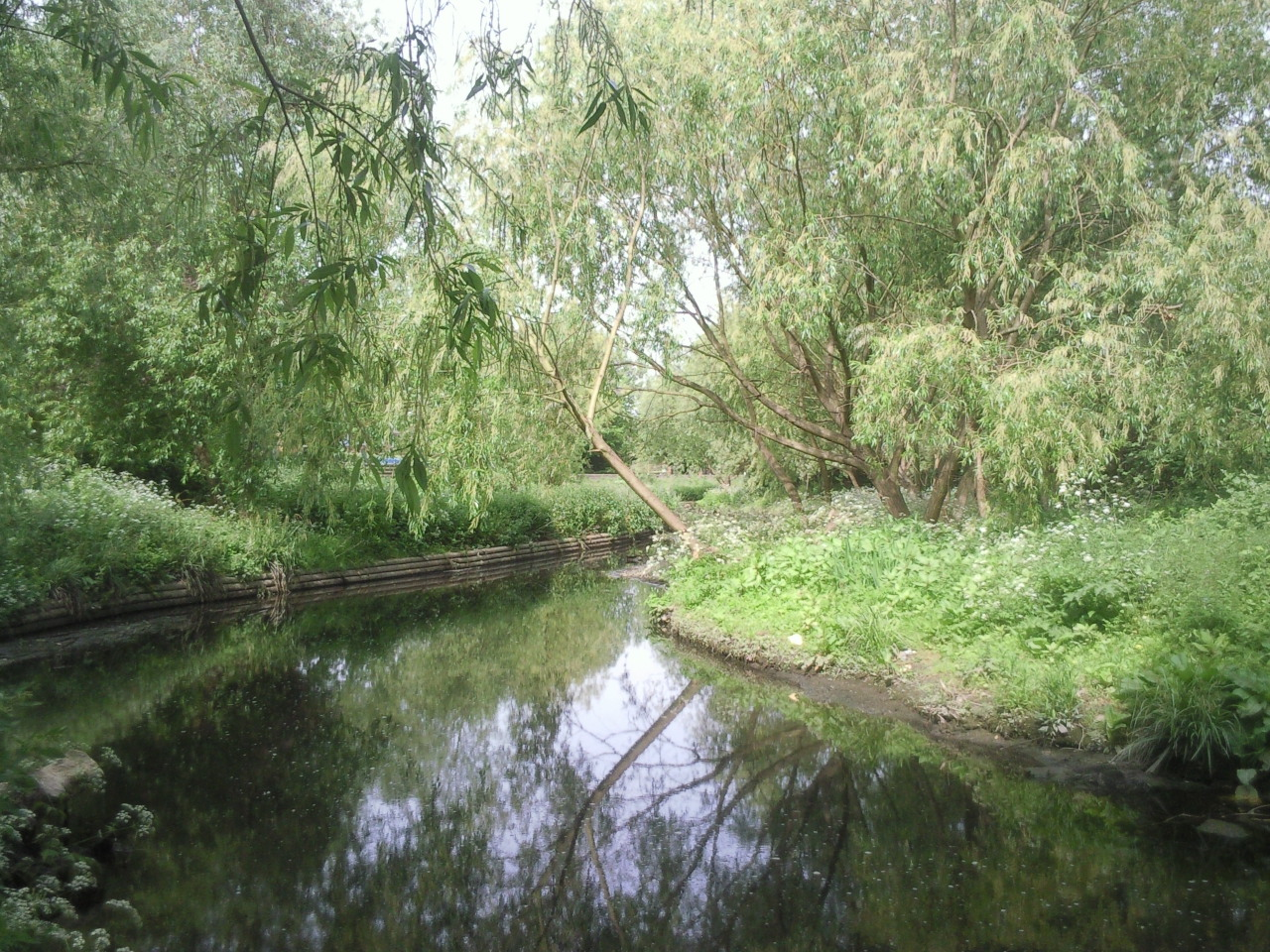
The Ravensbourne in Brookmill Park

North of Ladywell Fields, passing to the east of Ladywell station, it continues under Lewisham, passing west of the Lewisham Shopping Centre and forming the boundary of the Cornmill Gardens playground. It flows to the east of Lewisham station, and then flows north into Deptford, forming the northeastern border of Brookmill Park. The Docklands Light Railway closely follows this stretch from Lewisham to Greenwich, as the river is crossed by the A2 and then widens north of Deptford Bridge station into its tidal reach, where it is named Deptford Creek.

Its confluence with the Thames is in Greenwich Reach, north-east of Deptford town centre and west of Greenwich.

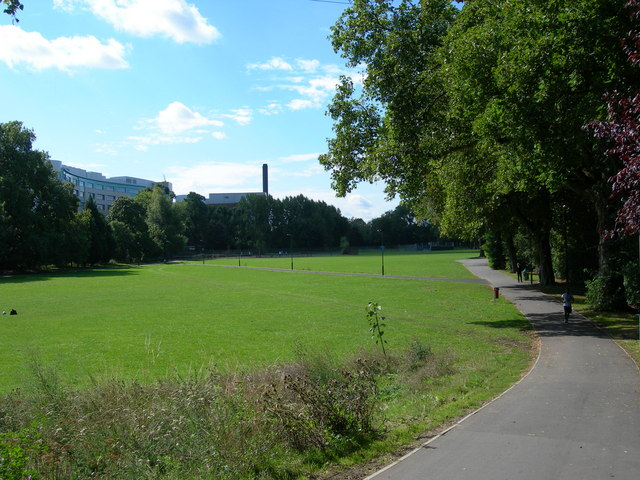
Before. Note chimney in this picture and next.

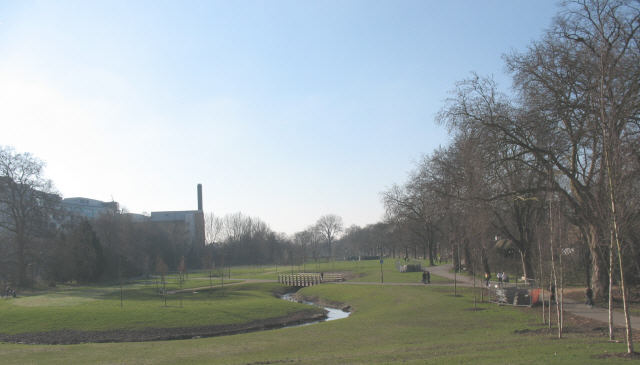
Immediately after re-meandering.

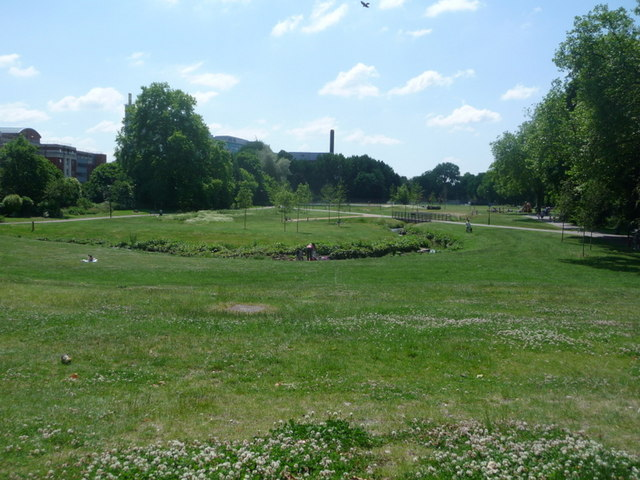
A year later, when the banks have renaturalized somewhat.

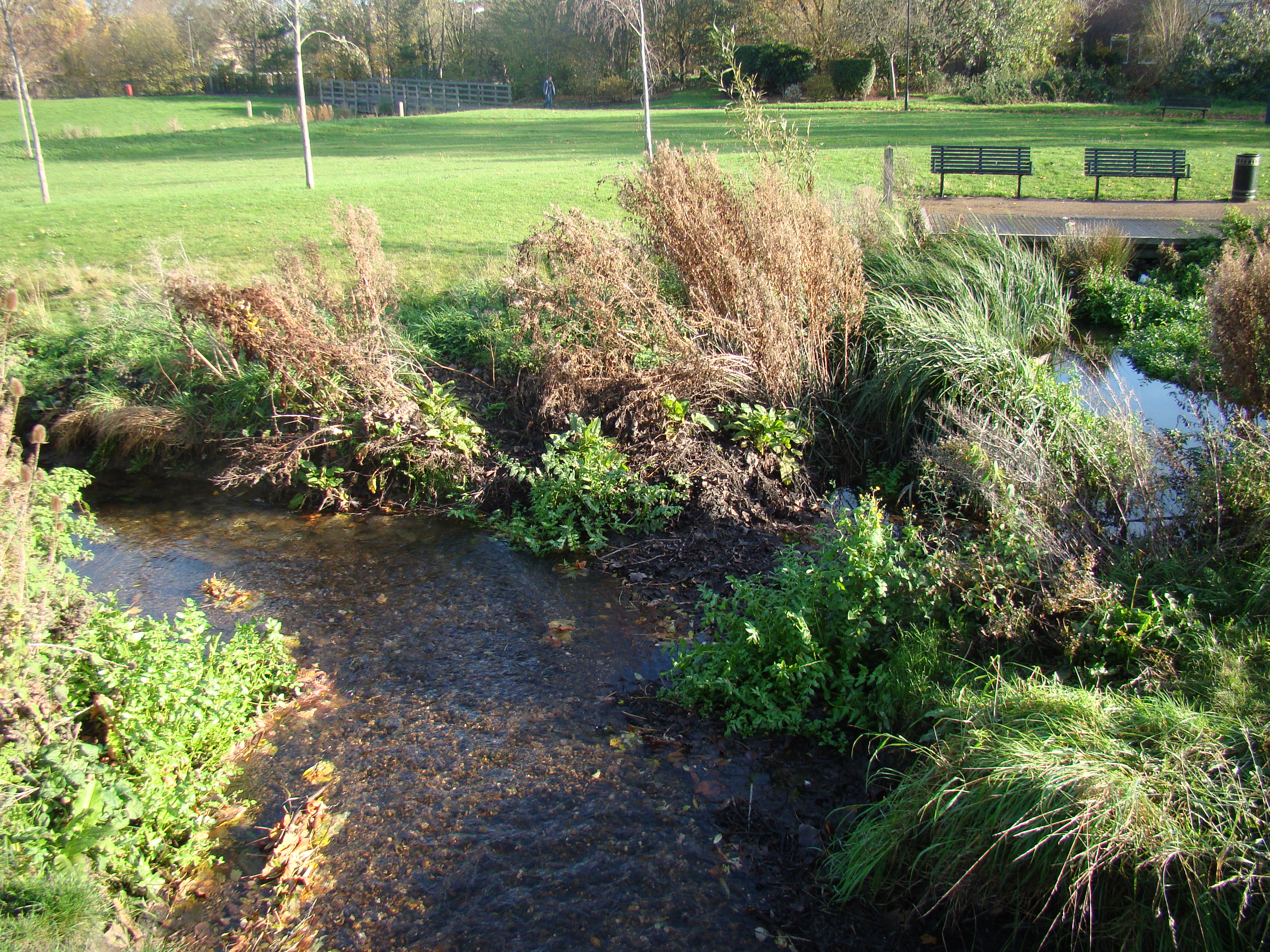
Three years after re-meandering.
The River Ravensbourne at Ladywell Fields was removed from the concrete and re-meandered. Park use more than doubled and most people went from feeling unsafe there to feeling safe.

Course of the River Ravensbourne

=== Tributaries ===
South of Bellingham, the small Spring Brook joins the Ravensbourne after flowing only about one mile (1.6 km) from the east through Plaistow and Downham; it crosses the borough boundary from Bromley to Lewisham and follows a narrow strip of parkland named Shaftesbury Park Recreation Ground and Downham Playing Fields along its short course.

Just above Catford the Ravensbourne is joined by the River Pool. The Ravensbourne is also joined by the River Quaggy (known upstream of Sundridge Park as Kyd Brook, and 3.5 miles (5.6 km) in length). This rises near Princess Royal University Hospital at Locksbottom then flows north through Petts Wood to Sundridge Park in Bromley where its name changes to the River Quaggy. It then flows northwards through the Mottingham area to Kidbrooke where it then turns westwards through Manor Park in Lee, before joining the Ravensbourne at Loampit Vale in Lewisham.

Numerous other small streams and surface water outfalls join the main river between its source and confluence. Until the 19th century one such stream flowed from Brockley Cross crossing Tanners Hill before joining at Deptford Creek.

== Etymology ==
The earliest documented name is Randesbourne in 1360, then Rendesburne in 1372, Randysborne in 1516 and Ravensburn in 1575. The later spelling of Ravensbourne is thus due to folk etymology, and the likely meaning is 'boundary stream', from Old English rand and burna. In its ten-mile course, the Ravensbourne forms the boundary between several sets of parishes.

== History ==
The Domesday Book recorded eleven corn mills on the Ravensbourne in the 11th century. The 17th century London diarist John Evelyn bought one of these mills – Brookmills – in 1668 for "grinding colour" from the Beecher family. It was later used by the Kent Waterworks company. It was finally demolished in the 1850s.

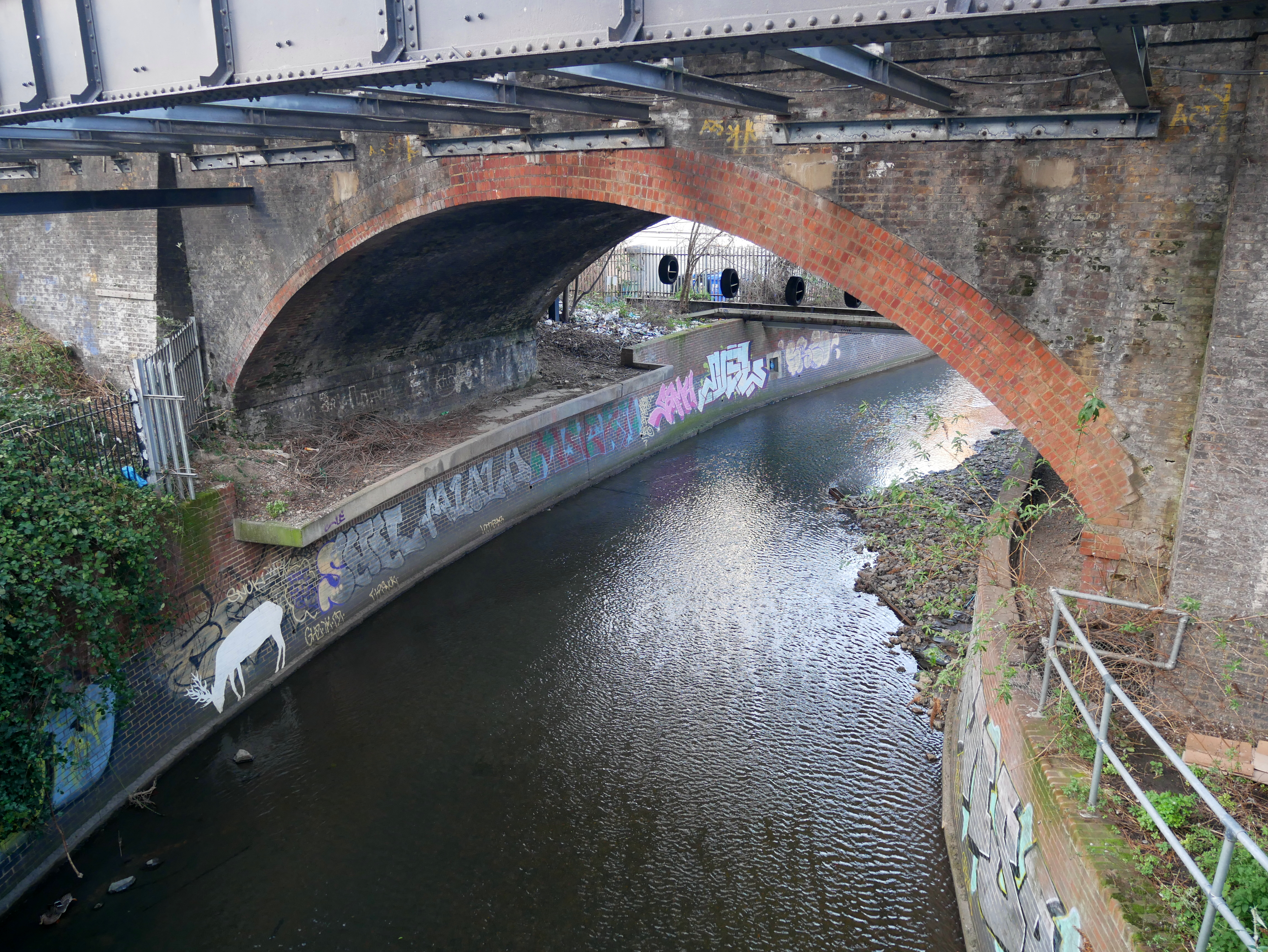
The River Ravensbourne as it passes under an arch of Lewisham railway station, 2022

The bridge over Deptford Creek was the site of the Battle of Deptford Bridge, 17 June 1497, the last battle of the Cornish Rebellion of 1497.

From the 16th century onwards until its closure in the 19th century, the proximity of Deptford Dockyard, a Royal Dockyard created by Henry VIII, gave employment to many small shipbuilders on the creek. Queen Elizabeth I knighted Francis Drake on board the Golden Hind in Deptford Creek on Drake's return from his circumnavigation of the globe in 1580. The Golden Hind remained moored in the creek until it broke up.

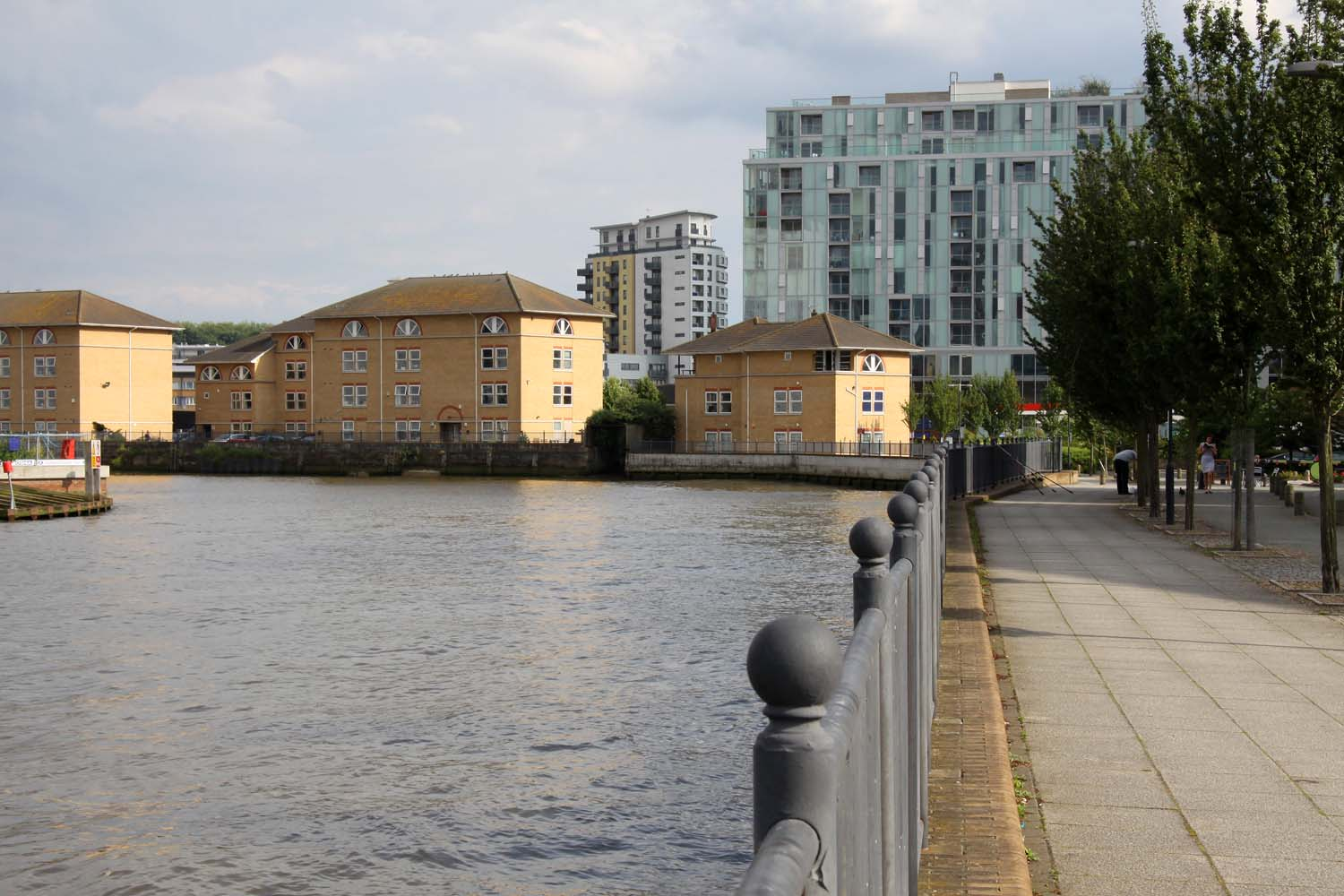
Deptford Creek, facing south, in 2012

Deptford Creek was also host to a large power station, now dismantled, as well as other heavy industries. Now regeneration of the area is under way. For much of the lower reach between Lewisham and the Thames, the Ravensbourne (and Deptford Creek) is joined by the Docklands Light Railway. Indeed, the channel was diverted in Brookmill Park so that the DLR could run along the route of the river. A new bend in the river was constructed that gave more natural banks and created a better habitat for flora and fauna.

Just south of the DLR's final northern crossing of the river, on the eastern bank, is Deptford pumping station, constructed in the 1860s as part of the London sewerage system. There are also a number of new developments, including the Laban Dance Centre and apartment blocks at the mouth of the creek alongside the Thames, approximately 0.5 km west of Greenwich town centre.

Between 1974 and 1997, the name of the river was used for the Ravensbourne parliamentary constituency within the London Borough of Bromley. It also gives its name to a railway station.

Every year on 1 May at 5.32am, the Ravensbourne Morris Men dance up the Beltaine Sunrise at Caesars Well, the source of the Ravensbourne River.

== See also ==
- Tributaries of the River Thames
- List of rivers in England
- River Quaggy
- Creekside Discovery Centre

Next confluence upstream	River Thames	Next confluence downstream
Regent's Canal (north) (Limehouse Basin)	River Ravensbourne	River Lea (north)
