= Chinbrook Meadows =

Park in London Borough of Lewisham, United Kingdom

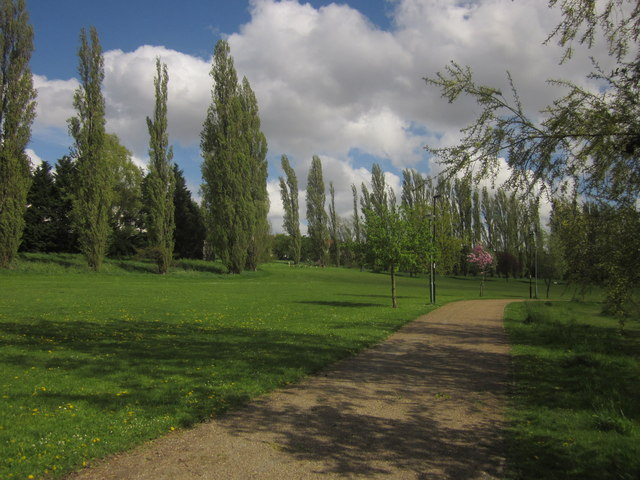

- Location within London Borough of Lewisham
- Type: Public park
- Location: Chinbrook in the London Borough of Lewisham, England
- Coordinates: 51°25′44″N 0°01′41″E
- Area: 31 acres (13 ha)
- Created: 1929, (expanded 1937)
- Operator: London Borough of Lewisham
- Open: 24 hours (pedestrian), 8am-sunset (car park)
- Status: Open year round
- Awards: Green Flag Award 2005, 2006, 2007
- Public transit: Grove Park railway station, Buses 124, 126, 273 638
- Website: lewisham.gov.uk/inmyarea/openspaces/parks/chinbrook-meadows

Chinbrook Meadows (sometimes Chinbrook Meadow) is a park in southeast London, England, one of Lewisham's public open spaces. It is located between Chinbrook and Grove Park in the London Borough of Lewisham adjacent to the boundary with the London Borough of Bromley. The park is within the SE12 postcode district, next to the border of the BR1 postcode district.

The majority of the park is maintained short grass with paved footpaths and lined with tall trees and bisected by the River Quaggy which flows northward through the park. The grass often has markings for football pitches, a cricket ground and other sports and is used by local schools for sports days. Chinbrook Meadows contains public toilets, a concrete ball court, a café, a cycle route, a dog exercise area, a football pitch, tennis courts and a children's play area with climbing frames and a sandpit. The numerous footpaths crossing the park form part of The Green Chain Walk and Capital Ring.

The park is around half a mile long north to south, about half as wide east to west and is surrounded by and has entrances on Chinbrook Road and Amblecote Road to the north, Mayeswood Road to the east, a railway line and Portland Road to the south and west, and Elmstead Wood to the south. Under the railway line there is a pedestrian subway tunnel that crosses the borough boundary into Bromley and links the park to a much smaller green area southwest of the main park. There is no gate separating the two, but the smaller area, being under the authority of another borough the London Borough of Bromley, is sometimes not considered part of the same park, the map on the website does not show it, but shows the park entrance to be the pedestrian subway. The footpath that leaves the southeast corner of Chinbrook Meadows is part of the Green Chain Walk passes some allotments then Grove Park Cemetery before entering Elmstead Wood.

Pedestrian gates to the park remain open throughout the night, whilst the car park gates are opened at 08:00 every morning and closed near dusk, with times ranging from 16:30 to 21:00 in the evening depending on the time of year.

== History ==
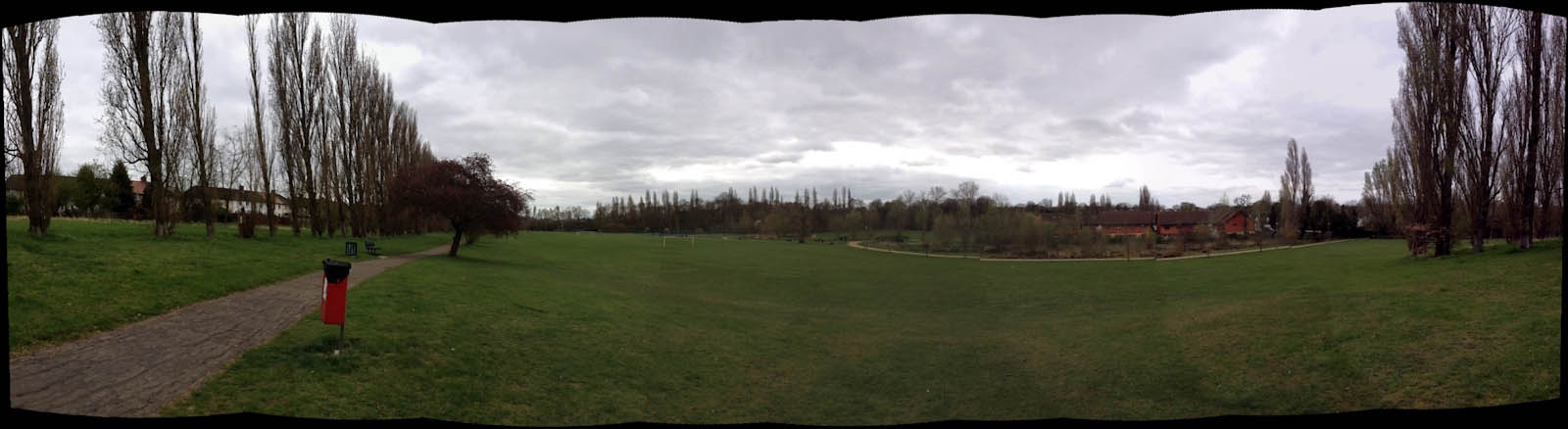
Chinbrook Meadows looking south

The area was previously occupied by Chinbrook Farm, a dairy farm. The park was first formally opened to the public in 1929 and was then a children's play area 8 acres (32,000 m^{2}) in size, on the edge of the recently built Grove Park Estate; London County Council purchased a further 23 acres (93,000 m^{2}) acres and the larger area was opened to the public in June 1937.

A church was built by the Shaftesbury Society as a 'mission hall' on the border of the park in Mayeswood Road in the Grove Park Estate, and dedicated in May 1935. This mission hall was used as a Baptist church until recently when it was taken over by City of Faith Church in 2005 and then by Word of Life Church in 2015.

The southern corner of Chinbrook Meadows became allotments, but many were in disuse in the early 1990s and a government grant paid for trees to be planted on some of the area. After 2000 some allotments have come back in use and some of the orchard re-claimed as allotments.

The Meadows also host the annual Grove Park Carnival & Chinbrook Dog Show .

=== River Quaggy ===
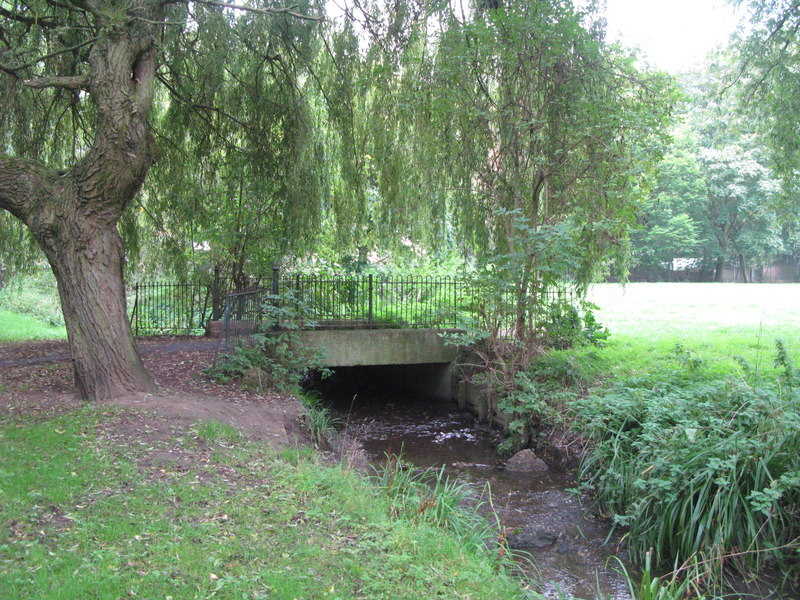
Footbridge over the River Quaggy, in Chinbrook Meadows

In the 1960s the River Quaggy within Chinbrook Meadows and other parks was channelized into long straight concrete culverts to alleviate flooding and was closed off behind tall hedges and iron fences, this cut the park in two with the larger part to the east of the river. In the early 2000s however the concrete channel with its fences and hedges was demolished and river was remodeled to give a natural, meandering appearance with a small flood plain; this was to encourage wild plants and animals back to the area and to be more pleasant and attractive for the public. There are several wooden foot bridges over the river, that replaced the concrete ones with iron fences. The regeneration was completed on 1 October 2002 and cost a reported £1.1million. Since the restoration Chinbrook Meadows has won the Green Flag Award in three years in a row, from 2005-07 Shortly After the regeneration was completed the same river was given a similar regeneration further down stream within Sutcliffe Park, a mile and a half to the north.

== Transport links ==
There are bus stops by the northern entrance on Chinbrook Road which London Buses 124, 126, 273 and school bus 638 serve. Grove Park centre is less than half a mile to the west of this entrance and is also served by these buses plus four more, 136, 181, 261 and night bus N136 as well as Grove Park railway station and the A2212 road. The 284 bus serves Chinbrook which is a similar distance east from the same entrance. The park is also on both the Green Chain Walk and the Capital Ring.
