= Burnt Ash =

Burnt Ash may refer to:

- Burnt Ash, Gloucestershire, England
- Burnt Ash, London, archaic place name, part of Grove Park, Lewisham in the London Borough of Lewisham, southeast London, United Kingdom.
- The A2212 road (Burnt Ash Road, Burnt Ash Hill, Burnt Ash Lane) and the surrounding area in southeast London
