= River Quaggy =

Coordinates: 51°27′20″N 0°00′12″W

Quaggy Kyd Brook, Chin Brook
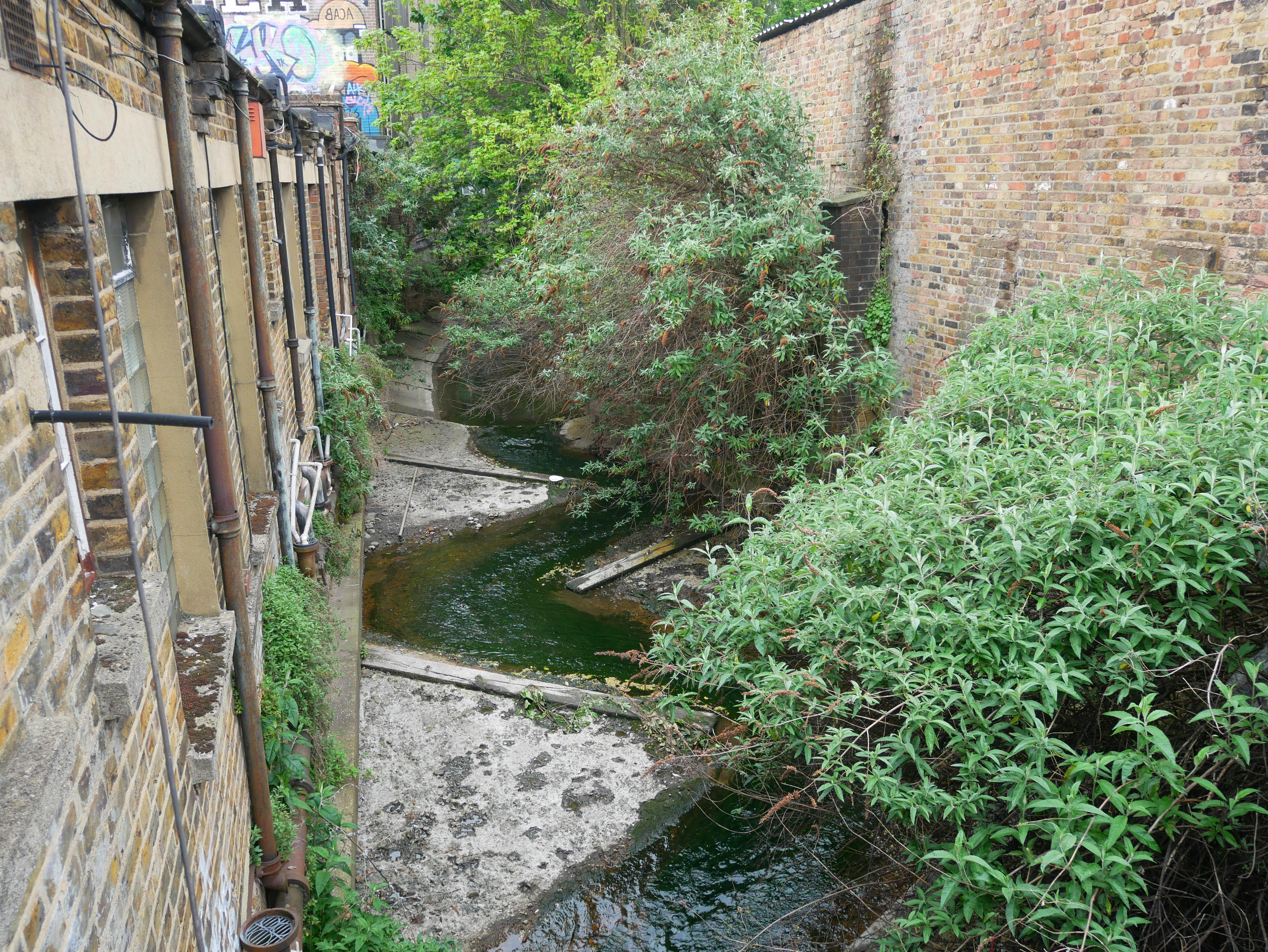
- River Quaggy as it passes through Lewisham

Location
- Country: England
- County: Greater London
- London Boroughs: Bromley, Lewisham, Greenwich
- Places: Locksbottom, Farnborough, Crofton, Orpington, Petts Wood, Hawkwood, Chislehurst, Bickley, Elmstead, Sundridge, Grove Park, Chinbrook, Mottingham, Horn Park, Middle Park, Eltham, Blackheath Park, Kidbrooke, Lee Green, Hither Green, Lewisham

Physical characteristics
- Source
  - location: Locksbottom, Farnborough, London Borough of Bromley
  - elevation: 122 m (400 ft)
- Mouth
  - location: River Ravensbourne, Lewisham station, Lewisham, London Borough of Lewisham
  - elevation: 9 m (30 ft)
- Length: 17 km (11 mi)

Basin features
- Tributaries
  - left: Main Branch, Milk Street Ditch, Border Ditch, Quaggy Hither Green
  - right: East Branch, Petts Wood Ditch, Grove Park Ditch, Little Quaggy, Well Hall Stream, Lower Kid Brooke, Middle Kid Brooke, Upper Kid Brooke

The River Quaggy (often the Quaggy River or simply Quaggy) is a river, 17 kilometres (11 mi) in length, passing through the south-east London boroughs of Bromley, Greenwich and Lewisham. In its lower reaches it is an urban river, in its upper reaches further from London it is more natural and known as the Kyd Brook. The river rises from two sources near Princess Royal University Hospital (PRUH) at Locksbottom and is a tributary of the River Ravensbourne which it flows into near Lewisham station in Lewisham.

A long stretch of Kyd Brook is visible in Hawkwood, an area of open farmland and countryside upstream of Chislehurst that is owned and managed by the National Trust, but open to the public free of charge. From there the river flows northwards through Sundridge Park Golf Course then on across Chinbrook Meadows between Chinbrook and Grove Park, then through the outer parts of Mottingham, Middle Park, Horn Park, and Eltham. The river then enters Sutcliffe Park and starts to flow west through southern Kidbrooke, and Blackheath then finally through Lee and its park Manor House Gardens into Hither Green then Lewisham where it joins the River Ravensbourne next to Lewisham station. In Sutcliffe Park, the river used to run under the road and via a covered culvert through the park. This was remodelled several years ago to reintroduce a flood area to protect areas further down stream. Also this created a marshy area for wildlife to return. It is now an oasis full of wildlife in the middle of two major roads.

As part of the Ravensbourne catchment area, the river is kept constantly under inspection by the Environment Agency which issues flood warnings when applicable.

== River engineering ==
In the 1960s the River Quaggy within Chinbrook Meadows, Sutcliffe Park, and other parks was channelized into long straight concrete culverts to alleviate flooding. In Chinbrook Meadows the channelized river was closed off behind tall hedges and iron fences; this cut the park in two with the larger part to the east of the river. In the early part of the current century the concrete channel with its fences and hedges was demolished and the river was remodelled to give a natural, meandering appearance with a small flood plain; this was to encourage wild plants and animals back to the area and to be more pleasant and attractive for the public. There are several wooden foot bridges over the river replacing the concrete ones and their iron fences. The regeneration was completed on 1 October 2002 and cost a reported £1.1million. Since the restoration Chinbrook Meadows has won the Green Flag Award two years in a row. Shortly after the regeneration was completed the Quaggy was given a similar regeneration further downstream within Sutcliffe Park, a mile and a half to the north.

== Name ==
The name has existed for quite a long while; references to it can be found in numerous works of British fiction in the 19th and 20th centuries, for example in Edith Nesbit's The New Treasure Seekers. The name probably originated from the words quagmire and quaggy.

=== Other names ===
The river has been known by other names. Today Kyd Brook usually refers to the river in its upper reaches in Chislehurst and Farnborough. The place Kidbrooke took its name from the river but is on its lower reaches, where there are two tributaries called Middle Kidbrooke and Lower Kid Brook. The place name Chinbrook is derived from "Chin Brook" which was another alternative name for the Quaggy River in that area at the beginning of the twentieth century.

== Tributaries ==
The River Quaggy itself is a tributary of the River Ravensbourne which in turn flows into the River Thames. The Quaggy also has several small and named tributaries of its own. From source to mouth they are:

- Main Branch (3.7 kilometres or 2.3 miles)
- East Branch (2.2 kilometres or 1.4 miles) - the two branches rise in Locksbottom, flow north and join at Petts Wood.
- Petts Wood Ditch (1 kilometre or 0.62 miles), rises is southern Chislehurst, flows southward through the woodland of Petts Wood joining the Kyd Brook in northern Petts Wood.
- Milk Street Ditch (0.3 kilometres or 0.19 miles), rises near and is named after Milk Street in Sundridge, then flows east and joins the Quaggy in Sundridge Park Golf Course.
- Border Ditch (0.6 kilometres or 0.37 miles), rises in southern Grove Park, flows mostly eastward, joining the Quaggy in southern Chinbrook Meadows.
- Grove Park Ditch (0.5 kilometres or 0.31 miles), rises in Lower Marvels Wood, Mottingham, flows west and joins the Quaggy in a sports ground just north of Chinbrook Meadows.
- Little Quaggy (4.2 kilometres or 2.6 miles), rises in Chislehurst, flows north through Coldharbour and Mottingham, through the lake of The Tarn then flows west and joins the Quaggy near Horn Park.
  - Fairy Hall Flow (2.1 kilometres or 1.3 miles) intermittent stream, when it flows, it rises in Elmstead, flows north through Mottingham, and joins the Little Quaggy near Horn Park
- Well Hall Stream (2.7 kilometres or 1.7 miles), rises in Shooters Hill, flows west through Well Hall then joins the Quaggy in Sutcliffe Park.
- Lower Kid Brooke (2.5 kilometres or 1.6 miles), rises in Well Hall, Eltham and flows southeast splitting into two distributaries before and joining the Quaggy in southern Blackheath.
- Middle Kid Brooke (1.9 kilometres or 1.2 miles), rises in Kidbrooke and flows southwest splitting into two distributaries before joining the Quaggy in Lee.
- Upper Kid Brooke (2.3 kilometres or 1.4 miles), rises in Kidbrooke and flows west before joining the Quaggy in Lewisham. These tributaries give their name to the place Kidbrooke.
- Quaggy Hither Green (1 kilometre or 0.62 miles), rises in Hither Green and flows north joining the Quaggy north of Hither Green railway station.

Another fairly substantial tributary and also so named, runs west, southwest from its source at Shooters Hill amalgamating with the main body in Kidbrooke.
