= Chinbrook =

Area of southeast London, England

Coordinates: 51.4316°N 0.0314°E

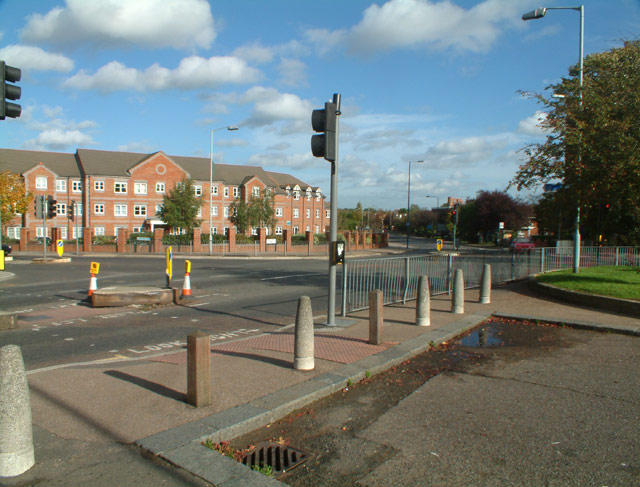
- Crossroads at Chinbrook, looking northeast toward the retirement home, where The Chinbrook public house previously stood.

- Location within Greater London
- OS grid reference: TQ411722
- London borough: Lewisham
- Ceremonial county: Greater London
- Region: London
- Country: England
- Sovereign state: United Kingdom
- Post town: LONDON
- Postcode district: SE12, SE9
- Dialling code: 020
- Police: Metropolitan
- Fire: London
- Ambulance: London
- UK Parliament: Lewisham East
- London Assembly: Greenwich and Lewisham

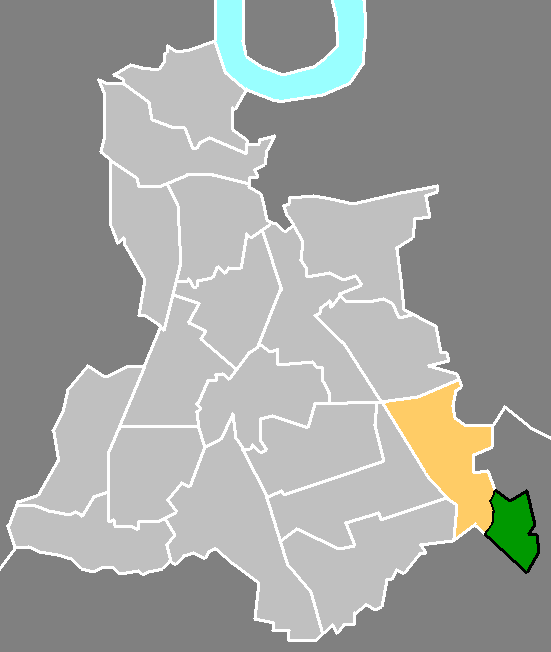
Chinbrook (green) within the ward of Grove Park (yellow), in the London Borough of Lewisham (light grey)

Chinbrook is an area of south east London, England, located 14 km (8.7 mi) southeast of Charing Cross in the London Borough of Lewisham. Chinbrook lies between Grove Park and Mottingham, approximately half a mile east of Grove Park centre and is generally considered part of Grove Park.

Most of Chinbrook including the main crossroads falls within the London Borough of Lewisham and under the postcode district SE12, although immediately northeast from the crossroads is the border with the London Borough of Bromley and the SE9 postcode district. The River Quaggy flows northward through Chinbrook and forms part of the borough and postal boundaries there.

== Name and toponymy ==
The name Chinbrook is derived from "Chin Brook" which was an alternative name for the Quaggy River at the turn of the twentieth century. The place Kidbrooke is also on the River Quaggy and its name is also derived from an alternative name for the river, "Kyd Brook". Chinbrook is occasionally mispronounced and misspelled "Chimbrook".

== Transport ==
The main crossroads has traffic lights and several bus stops close by. The main road, the B226, passes East to West through the hamlet; westward being Chinbrook Road toward Grove Park joining Baring Road (A2212), and northeast, Grove Park Road toward Mottingham. Marvels Lane is a smaller road passing north to south; southward it joins Dunkery Road, which goes eastward also towards Mottingham; northward Marvels Lane joins Burnt Ash Hill which goes through the northern part of Grove Park towards Lee. There are footpaths in the area mostly running north to south along the green area following the River Quaggy, and some form part of the Green Chain Walk and Capital Ring.

London Buses 126, 124, and 273 pass through Chinbrook using the same roads: Chinbrook Road, Marvels Lane then Dunkery Road. The 284 bus begins its route here at nearby Grove Park Cemetery and travels along Marvels Lane and Chinbrook Road. The school bus 638 also passes through on Grove Park Road and Chinbrook Road. Grove Park is only half a mile to the west along Chinbrook Road and has more buses and a railway station. Chinbrook, like Grove Park centre is in London fare zone 4.

== Amenities ==
Shops: Immediately west of the crossroads there is a parade of shops on the north side of Chinbrook road; the biggest shop here is a Costcutter small supermarket or convenience store on the corner. Other shops include several take-aways, a newsagent, off licence and a beauty salon. There was a large public house with its own garden called Grove Park Tavern, previously called The Chinbrook, on the northeast corner of the main crossroads; this was demolished in the late 1990s and the site now contains retirement flats. Grove Park Tavern is still used sometimes to refer to the crossroads even though it no longer stands there.

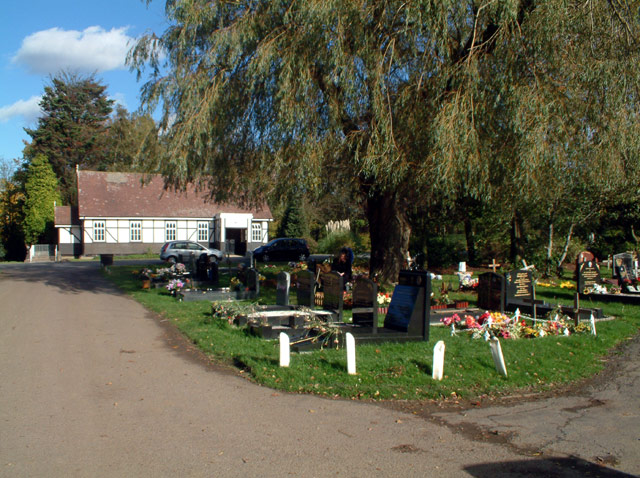
Grove Park Cemetery

Recreation: As well as the public Chinbrook Meadows there are also several private sports grounds, a youth club, and a Bannatyne gym–health club, built in 2001 replacing an older sports club. These lie to the north and east of the crossroads within the London Borough of Bromley and the SE9 postcode district.

Marvels Lane Primary School is on Riddons Road in Grove Park Estate and backs onto Marvels Lane. The head teacher is Edward Dove.

Grove Park Cemetery A small cemetery that opened in 1935 and is found southeast of Chinbrook Meadows and Grove Park Estate; its entrance is at the southern end of Marvels Lane.

Word of Life Church is located at the church hall on Mayeswood Road in the Grove Park Estate, and backs onto Chinbrook Meadows. This is a Pentecostal church, part of the Elim Church network, and connected to Kensington Temple. The church leader is Rev Rowland Henshaw.

Chinbrook Surgery a small doctor's surgery located on Chinbrook Road with two general practitioners.

== Residential ==
There is a mixture of terraced houses, semi-detached houses and flats on the through roads and cul-de-sac roads. There is a building on the northeast corner of the main crossroads containing many retirement flats, this was built in 1999 where Grove Park Tavern previously stood. There are two main housing estates in the area.

Grove Park Estate, to the southwest of the crossroads is a group of roads all with terraced houses, and some semi-detached houses between Marvels Lane and Chinbrook Meadows that was built by Lewisham council between 1926 and 1929.

Chinbrook Estate, to the southeast of the crossroads is several small roads, has two high tower blocks plus many smaller terrace houses and flats and two community centres. It lies in the south east corner of the Grove Park ward but comes under SE9 not SE12 like most of Grove Park. It is surrounded by and has entrances on Marvels Lane, Dunkery Road, Grove Park Road and Mottingham Sports Ground. It was built more recently than Grove Park Estate.

== Chinbrook Meadows ==
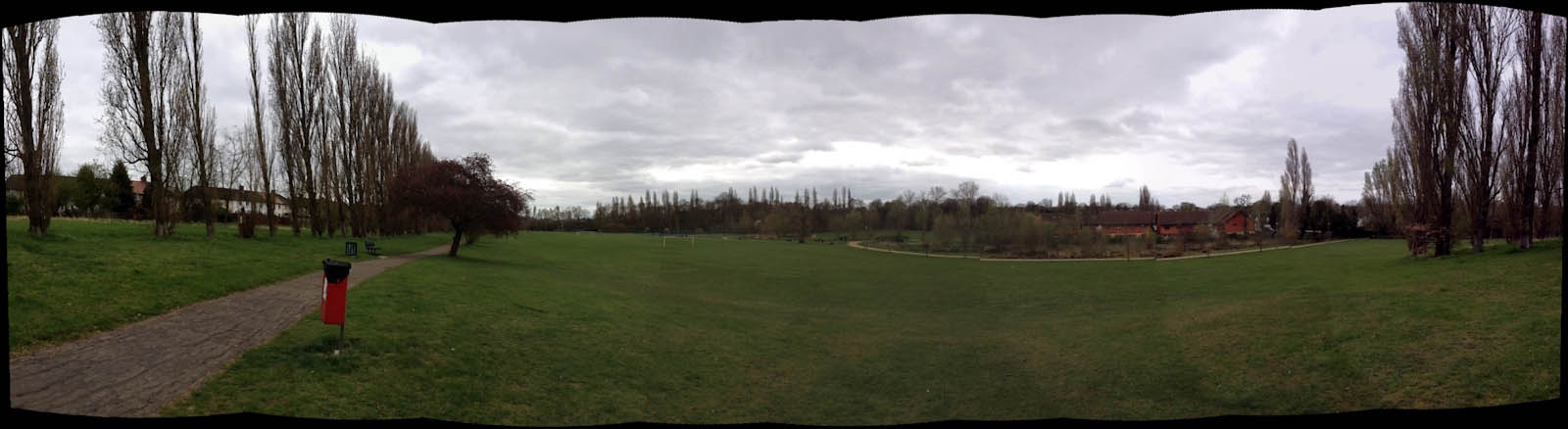
Chinbrook Meadows looking south

Chinbrook Meadows sometimes Chinbrook Meadow is one of Lewisham's public open spaces or parks in the south of Chinbrook and Grove Park, the area was previously occupied by Chinbrook Farm, a dairy farm. The park was first formally opened to the public in 1929 and was then a children's play area of 8-acre (32,000 m^{2}), on the edge of the recently built Grove Park Estate; London County Council purchased a further 23 acres (93,000 m^{2}); and the larger area was opened to the public in June 1937.

The majority of the park is maintained short grass with footpaths and lined with tall trees and bisected by the River Quaggy; the grass often has markings for football pitches, a cricket ground and other sports and is used by local schools for sports days. Chinbrook meadows also contains public toilets, public concrete tennis courts, and a football pitch and basketball court in one, plus a children's play area with a paddling pool. Some of the many footpaths crossing the park form part of The Green Chain Walk and Capital Ring. The Quaggy River flows northward through Chinbrook Meadows. In the 1960s the river within the park was channelized into a long straight concrete culverts to alleviate flooding and was closed off behind tall hedges and iron fences, this cut the park in two with the larger part to the east of the river. In the early 2000s however the concrete channel with its fences and hedges was demolished and river was remodeled to give a natural, meandering appearance with a small flood plain; this was to encourage wild plants and animals back to the area and to be more pleasant and attractive for the public. There are several foot bridges with wooden hand rails over the river, that replaced the concrete ones with iron fences. The regeneration was completed on 1 October 2002 and cost a reported £1.1million.

The small southern part of Chinbrook Meadows became allotments, but many were in disuse in the early 1990s and a government grant paid for trees to be planted on some of the area, although some of the allotments still remain in use. The park is around half a mile long north to south, half as wide and is surrounded by Chinbrook Road to the north, Mayeswood Road to the east and the railway line to the south and west, under the railway line there is a pedestrian subway tunnel that crosses the borough boundary into Bromley and links the park to a much smaller green area southwest of the main park. The footpath that leaves the southeast corner of Chinbrook Meadows is part of the Green Chain Walk passes the allotments then Grove Park Cemetery before entering Elmstead. Gates to the park are opened at 08:00 every morning and closing times range from 16:30 to 21:00 in the evening depending on the time of year.
