= Horn Park =

Area of south east London

Coordinates: 51.447°N 0.026°E

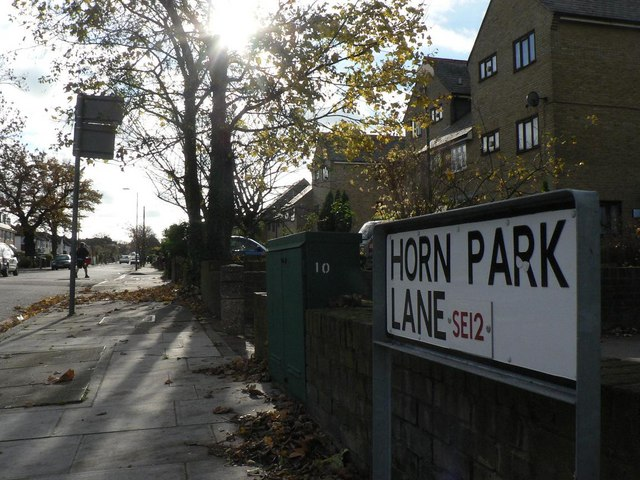

- Location within Greater London
- OS grid reference: TQ408739
  - Charing Cross: 7.8 mi (12.6 km) NW
- London borough: Greenwich
- Ceremonial county: Greater London
- Region: London
- Country: England
- Sovereign state: United Kingdom
- Post town: LONDON
- Postcode district: SE12
- Dialling code: 020
- Police: Metropolitan
- Fire: London
- Ambulance: London
- UK Parliament: Eltham and Chislehurst
- London Assembly: Greenwich and Lewisham

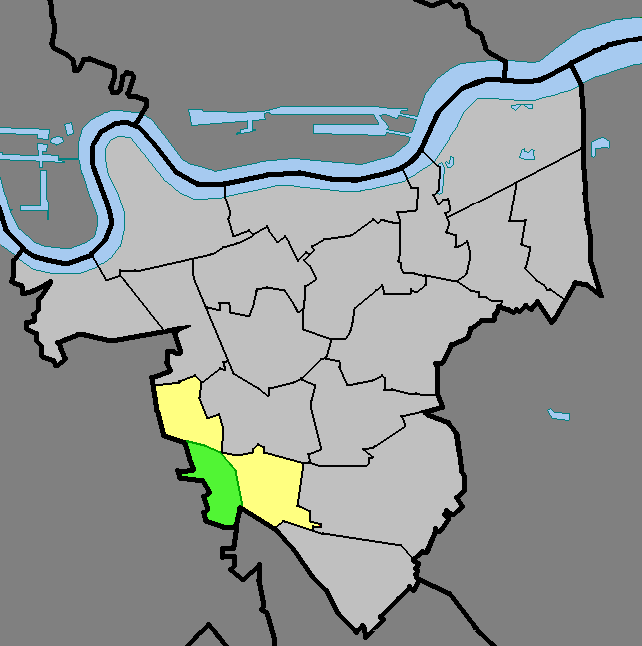
Horn Park (green) within the ward of Middle Park and Sutcliffe (yellow) in the Royal Borough of Greenwich (light grey)

Horn Park is an area of south east London south west of Eltham. It is located 12.5 km (7.8 mi) southeast of Charing Cross on the southwest edge of the Royal Borough of Greenwich and borders both the London Borough of Lewisham and the London Borough of Bromley. There is a public park also named Horn Park and two schools in the area. The River Quaggy flows northward though Horn Park, and the suburb is covered by the postcode district SE12, which was previously called the Lee postal district. There is community centre located in Horn Park Estate on Sibthorpe Road, that hosts a number of activities, such as Christian, council and MP meetings, and numerous classes including dance, karate and English.

== History ==
Horn Park was one of three parks attached to Eltham Palace. The area was heavily wooded and was stocked with deer until the destruction of both during the English Civil War. The park became farmland until 1936 when the Metropolitan Borough of Woolwich began the construction of the Horn Park Estate. The estate was not completed until the 1950s, with work being interrupted by World War II.

An old manor named Horne was recorded on the land in 1242, and later the area was recorded as park of Horn in 1481. Horn Park appears as a named place in a 1762 map by Emanuel Bowen, and an Ordnance Survey map from 1805. The Old English word Horn refers to a 'projecting horn-shaped piece of land'.

== Horn Park, public park ==
There is a public park, also named Horn Park, located in the south of the Horn Park area. The park is bordered by and has entrances on Winn Road to the south, Alnwick Road to the north, and Gavestone Road to the northwest, which continues through the park, although is closed to regular traffic. Horn Park Primary School is located adjacent to the park, on the north side, next to some public allotments. The park is mostly grassland, crossed with paths and lined with trees located on a hill, the west side being the higher ground; the City of London and the Isle of Dogs developments can be seen from the park. On the north side of the park near the primary school, there is a play area, this has been rebuilt several times. At present it contains a children's playground, a floodlit ball court, an outdoor gym and a small skatepark, when the site was constructed in the early 2000s it was the first skatepark in the Royal Borough of Greenwich. Before this was constructed the park contained an older children's playground and ball court on the same site. Gavestone Crescent that runs through the park is shown on old Ordnance Survey maps from the mid twentieth century to have previously had prefabs with gardens all the way along, and the park was then narrower, these prefabs have since been demolished, making the park wider. Today it's just a paved track, running from one park gate to another passing Allotments, and the playground, it is gated off and closed to normal traffic, but is used by council, maintenance and emergency vehicles.

== Transport ==
Several A roads pass through or near Horn Park. The South Circular Road (A205) dual carriageway cuts through east to west and is called Westhorne Avenue in the area. To the east and north of Horn Park the A20 road dual carriageway, named Sidcup Road, takes traffic in and out of London in a southeast to northwest direction. Just the west the A2212 road carries traffic north to south between Bromley and Lewisham. The A210 road begins at the northeast edge of Horn Park and continues east becoming Eltham High Street.

The Dartford Loop Line crosses Horn Park east to west, the two closest stations are Lee to the west and Mottingham to the east. The Dartford Loop Line and the stations of Lee and Mottingham opened in 1866.

Horn Park is served by several Transport for London bus services including 160, 273, B15 and more, connecting it with areas including Bexleyheath, Blackheath, Bromley, Catford, Chislehurst, Crystal Palace, Eltham, Falconwood, Grove Park, Hither Green, Lee, Lewisham, Petts Wood, Sidcup, Sydenham and Welling. London bus route 160 passes through Horn Park serving bus stops along the South Circular road, Westhorne Avenue, on its journey from Lee, then to Eltham, Chislehurst, and Sidcup. London bus route 273 passes through Horn Park along smaller residential roads, mostly following a hail and ride method, as there are few bus stops on this part of the route. The 273 bus route starts in Lewisham, then passes through Lee, Horn Park, Grove Park, Chislehurst and Petts Wood. London bus route B15 does an anti-clockwise loop around Horn Park before serving bus stops along the A 210, then continues to Eltham, Welling, Falconwood and Bexleyheath.

Eltham Road which is part of the A20 road, at the north side of Horn Park has bus stops serving five more London bus routes, the 321 bus running 24 hours a day from New Cross to Sidcup, the 122 bus running from Sydenham to Plumstead, the 178 bus running from Lewisham to Woolwich, the B16 bus running from Kidbrooke to Bexleyheath and the night bus N21 travelling from Trafalgar Square to Bexleyheath.

== Education ==
There are two schools in Horn Park. The primary school, Horn Park Primary School where about 450 pupils attend is located on Alnwick Road, in Horn Park estate, adjacent to the park. Colfe's School, an independent school, is located on the north side of Horn Park on Horn Park Lane, the current buildings and location date from 1963, but the school itself is centuries older.
