= Downham Fields =

Park in South East London

Coordinates: 51°25′36″N 0°00′26″E

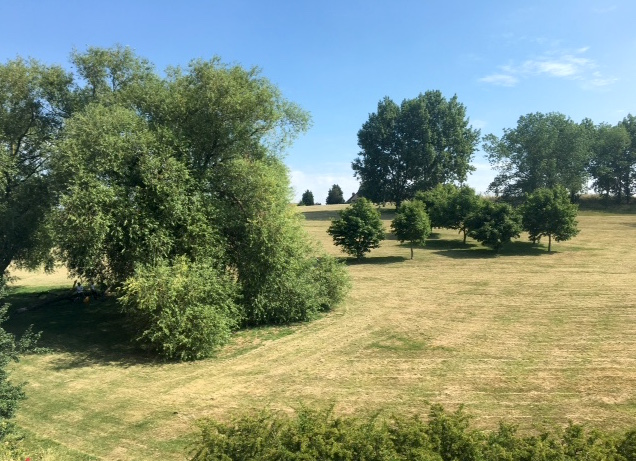
Downham Fields

Downham Fields is a 20-acre park located in Downham, South East London. It is sometimes referred to in documents by the name Durham Hill, but this is not in common usage. It was left as parkland during the construction of the interwar Downham Estate because its steep hill made building difficult.

The park's height and west-facing slope provides views to Croydon, Crystal Palace and Sydenham.

== Facilities ==
In 2007, part of the park was used to create Downham Health and Leisure Centre, which includes a swimming pool, gym, GP surgery and library. The park also includes an outdoor play area for children.
