= Middle Park, London =

Coordinates: 51.445°N 0.04°E

Middle Park
- Location within Greater London
- Population: 13,505 (2011 Census. Middle Park and Sutcliffe Ward 2011)
- OS grid reference: TQ417738
- London borough: Greenwich
- Ceremonial county: Greater London
- Region: London
- Country: England
- Sovereign state: United Kingdom
- Post town: LONDON
- Postcode district: SE9
- Dialling code: 020
- Police: Metropolitan
- Fire: London
- Ambulance: London
- UK Parliament: Eltham and Chislehurst
- London Assembly: Greenwich and Lewisham

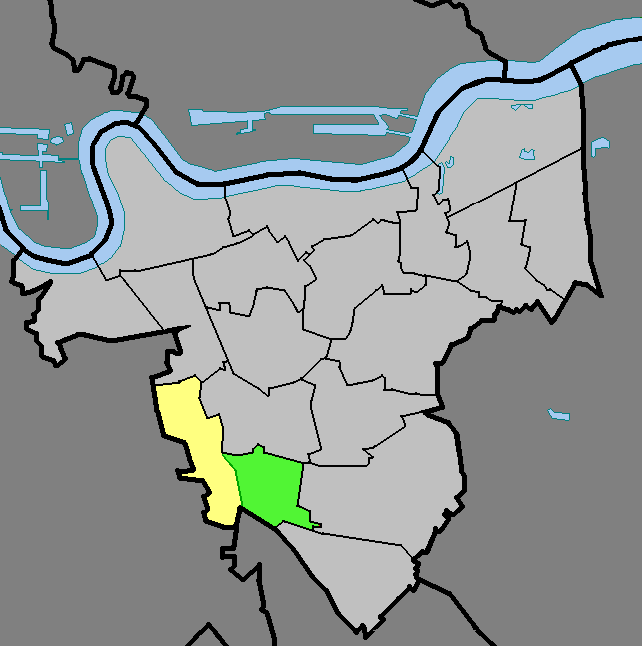
Middle Park (green) within the ward of Middle Park and Sutcliffe (yellow) in the Royal Borough of Greenwich (light grey)

Middle Park is an estate located in the Eltham district of the Royal Borough of Greenwich built between 1931 and 1936.
