= Grove Park, Lewisham =

District of south east London, England

Coordinates: 51.4313°N 0.0210°E

Grove Park
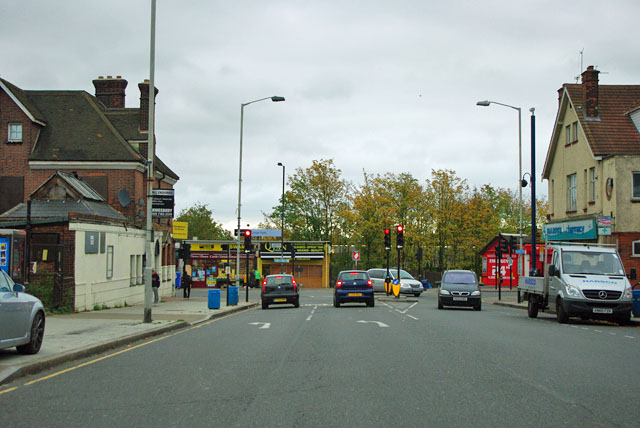
- Downham Way, looking west torward the junction with Baring Road, close to Grove Park railway station, October 2011. The Baring Hotel public house is visible on the left side of the road.

- Location within Greater London
- Population: 14,648 (2011 Census.Ward)
- OS grid reference: TQ404722
- London borough: Lewisham
- Ceremonial county: Greater London
- Region: London
- Country: England
- Sovereign state: United Kingdom
- Post town: LONDON
- Postcode district: SE9, SE12
- Post town: BROMLEY
- Postcode district: BR1
- Dialling code: 020
- Police: Metropolitan
- Fire: London
- Ambulance: London
- UK Parliament: Lewisham East
- London Assembly: Greenwich and Lewisham

Grove Park is a district of South East London, England within the London Borough of Lewisham. It is located north east of Bromley and south east of Lewisham.

Known for its green spaces, Grove Park is flanked by the Grove Park Nature Reserve and Northbrook Park, and Downham Fields to the west, Horn Park to the East, as well as Chinbrook Meadows, Kings Meadow and Sundridge Park to the south. As well as these there are various sports grounds and fields.

== Name and toponymy ==
There was a farm named Grove Farm, where Sometrees Avenue is now located, around 400 m (440 yd) north of Grove Park railway station. Grove Farm appeared in written land tax assessments of Lee parish, which encompassed it, from 1814, when it was run by a tenant farmer named Thomas Waller. It was likely a dairy farm, and it appears named on maps from at least 1870, and it is thought this farm gave its name to Grove Park railway station, Grove Park Road, the road built to join Grove Park to Mottingham, and also gave its name to Grove Park itself. It is presumed the word "Grove" in the place name was simply derived from a grove of trees that existed in the area. Grove Park railway station opened in 1871; The name "Grove Park" referring to the station, appeared on maps from at least 1884, but the name Grove Park referring directly to the place itself appears on maps slightly later, from as early as 1896.

== History ==
The area was developed as a London suburb in the 1870s. More development grew up around Grove Park railway station in the 19th century, though there had been settlements located here since Celtic times. Much of it consists of a housing estate built by the Metropolitan Borough of Lewisham in the 1920s.

A workhouse was built in the area in 1902. After use by the Army during the First World War it became Grove Park hospital. There are multiple public parks in the area, the largest of which is Chinbrook Meadows, through which the River Quaggy flows northward. The Quaggy runs through and joins the second park known as Mottingham playing fields (colloquially known as 'Foxes') which borders the neighbouring Mottingham area. Grove Park is also home to part of the Green chain walk, linking London's green spaces as well as Elmstead woods.

== Transport ==
=== Railway ===
Grove Park connects the area with National Rail services to London Charing Cross, London Cannon Street via Lewisham, Bromley North, Orpington and Sevenoaks.

=== Buses ===
Grove Park is served by several Transport for London bus routes and also has a bus garage. Routes 136, 181, 261, 273 284 and [London bus route SL4 (Superloop) serve the bus station whilst 124, 126, 136, 181, 261, 284 and night bus N136 serve Grove Park train station which is one bus stop away. Routes 136, 181 and SL4 terminate in the bus station.

The Routes:

- 124 to Eltham via Mottingham or Catford via Downham, Walters Road and Sandhurst Road.
- 126 to Eltham via Mottingham or Bromley South via Plaistow Green and Bromley North.
- 136 to Elephant & Castle via Downham, Catford Bus Garage, Catford, Ladywell, Lewisham and New Cross.
- 181 to Lewisham via Downham, Southend Lane, Lower Sydenham, Catford and Hither Green.
- 261 to Lewisham via Lee station and Lee Green or Locksbottom Princess Royal Hospital via Plaistow Green, Bromley town centre and Bromley Common.
- 273 to Lewisham Tesco via Lee Station, Lee Green, Lewisham town centre and Lewisham station or Petts Wood via Chislehurst and St Mary Cray.
- 284 to Grove Park Cemetery or Lewisham via Downham, Northover, Sandhurst Road, Catford, Ravensbourne Park and Ladywell.

== Nearest places ==
Grove Park borders Lee to the north, Horn Park to the north east, Mottingham to the east, Elmstead to the south east, Sundridge to the south, Downham to the south west and west and Hither Green to the north west.

== Postal ==
Grove Park is mostly covered by the SE12 postcode district; as Lee was originally the district name for SE12, residents and other localities in Grove Park sometimes include Lee as part of their address. About one tenth of the area of Grove Park ward in its southeast corner, containing Chinbrook Estate, is within the SE9 postcode district. There are two post office branches in Grove Park, one near the train station on Baring Road, and the other about 2 km (1.2 mi) to the north of the station, on Sibthorpe Road, off Westhorne Avenue. The area at the South of Grove Park from the junction of Burnt Ash Lane and Ridgeway Drive becomes Bromley and has the BR1 postcode.

== Churches ==
There are four main churches in the area representing different denominations.

St Augustine's Church (Church of England) is located at 336 Baring Road on the edge of South Lee and Grove Park. Archbishop Desmond Tutu ministered at St Augustine's between 1970 and 1974. The vicar is Rev Gavin Berriman.

Burnt Ash Methodist Church is located on Burnt Ash Hill on the edge of South Lee and Grove Park.

Word of Life Church is located at the church hall on Mayeswood Road in the Grove Park Estate, and backs onto Chinbrook Meadows. This is a Pentecostal church, part of the Elim Church network. The pastor is Rev Rowland Henshaw.

Kings Church Downham is located at 20 The Green, Downham Way. This church is a Charismatic church and part of the New Frontiers network. It is one of three sites that makes up Kings Church London, which is led by Steve Tibbert. The Site leader of the Downham Church is Joe MacNamara.

== Schools ==
There are two primary schools located in the catchment area, Marvels Lane and Coopers Lane School. Marvels Lane School also houses a children's centre. There is also a local secondary school now called Knights Academy, it was formerly Malory School.

== Notable places ==
Baring Hall Hotel is a Grade II listed building. Its designation describes it as a "restrained, carefully-proportioned and eloquent rendering of the ‘Queen Anne’ style, bearing the distinctive influence of Richard Norman Shaw's work of the 1870s."

The Archbishop Desmond Tutu Peace Garden was opened in 2009, in Chinbrook Meadows. Tutu lived nearby, at 29 Chinbrook Road, in the 1970s.

The Ringway Centre is a community hub developed on land across the route of the abandoned Ringway 2 urban motorway. The centre has a weekly 3-hour drop-in cafe with live music, hosts local groups and "Clay at the Ringway" venture, with a pottery kiln and classes subsidised for the community.

Grove Park Nature Reserve was opened in 1984 and provides an area for local schools to engage in forest school activities as well as public access. It is accessed via the Railway Children Walk, which is named after the book The Railway Children by Edith Nesbit, who lived in Grove Park for a time. The reserve is also part of the Green Chain Walk of South East London.

== Famous former residents ==
- Edith Nesbit
- Desmond Tutu
- Matthew Pennycook
- Keeley Hazell
- Shaun Wright-Phillips
- Marc Guéhi
