= Locksbottom =

Suburb of Greater London, England

Coordinates: 51.3708°N 0.0608°E

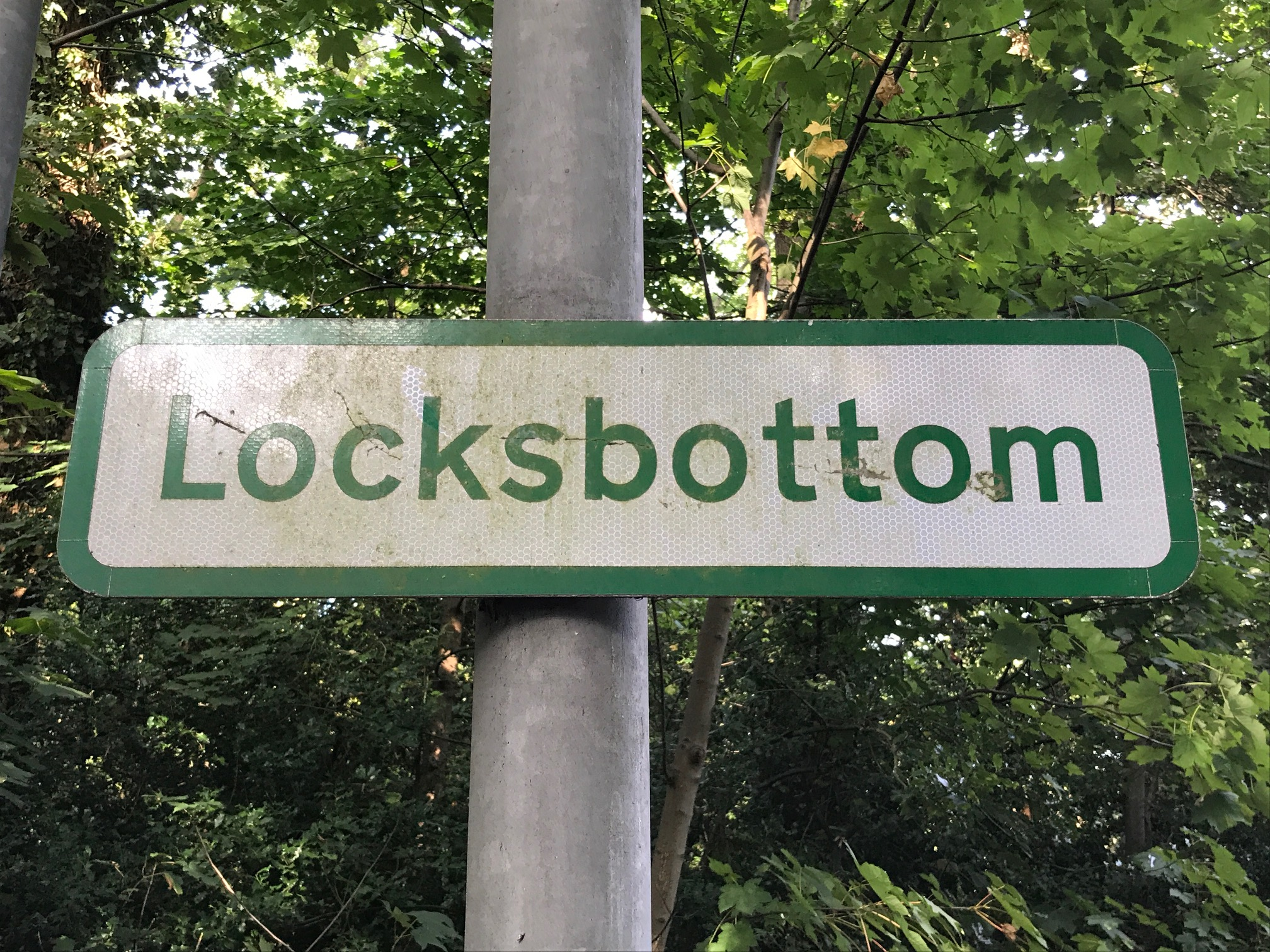

- Location within Greater London
- OS grid reference: TQ435655
- London borough: Bromley
- Ceremonial county: Greater London
- Region: London
- Country: England
- Sovereign state: United Kingdom
- Post town: ORPINGTON
- Postcode district: BR6
- Dialling code: 01689
- Police: Metropolitan
- Fire: London
- Ambulance: London
- UK Parliament: Orpington
- London Assembly: Bexley and Bromley

Locksbottom is a suburb of Orpington within the London Borough of Bromley, Greater London. Prior to 1965 it was within the historic county of Kent. It is located south of Bromley Common, west of Crofton, north-west of Farnborough, and east of Keston.

== History ==
The area is named after the Lock family, who owned land here in the 1700s. A workhouse was built here in March 1845, though by the 1920s it had been converted into an infirmary known as Farnborough Hospital. The interwar years saw suburban development and the area merged into Orpington in the east. In 2003 the hospital was redeveloped and renamed Princess Royal University Hospital and is now one of the major hospitals in this part of London.

== Amenities ==
Locksbottom is centred on a parade of shops on the western end of Crofton Road, running from the junction with Farnborough Common to Tugmutton Common. To the west lies Keston Park and to the north Farnborough Park, both of which are exclusive gated communities. A large supermarket backs onto the Princess Royal Hospital. There are also three pubs in the area - the Black Horse, the British Queen, and Ye Olde Whyte Lion. The award-winning Chapter One Restaurant (previously known as the Fantail) has been operating in the village since the 1930s. The church is St Michael and All Angels Roman Catholic Church, and was built between 1961 and 1964 by Henry Bingham Towner and officially opened by Archbishop Cyril Cowderoy; the building is of loadbearing brickwork, laid in English bond, around a steel frame.

== Transport ==
=== Rail ===
The nearest National Rail station to Locksbottom is Orpington station, located 1.8 miles away.

=== Buses ===
Locksbottom is served by London Buses routes 61, 261, 336, 353, 358, R2, R3 & R4. These connect it with areas including Biggin Hill, Beckenham, Bromley, Catford, Chislehurst, Crystal Palace, Grove Park, Hayes, Lewisham, Orpington & Penge.

== Gallery ==
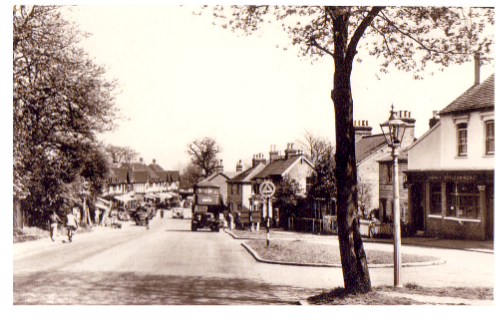
Crofton Road, Locksbottom in 1948

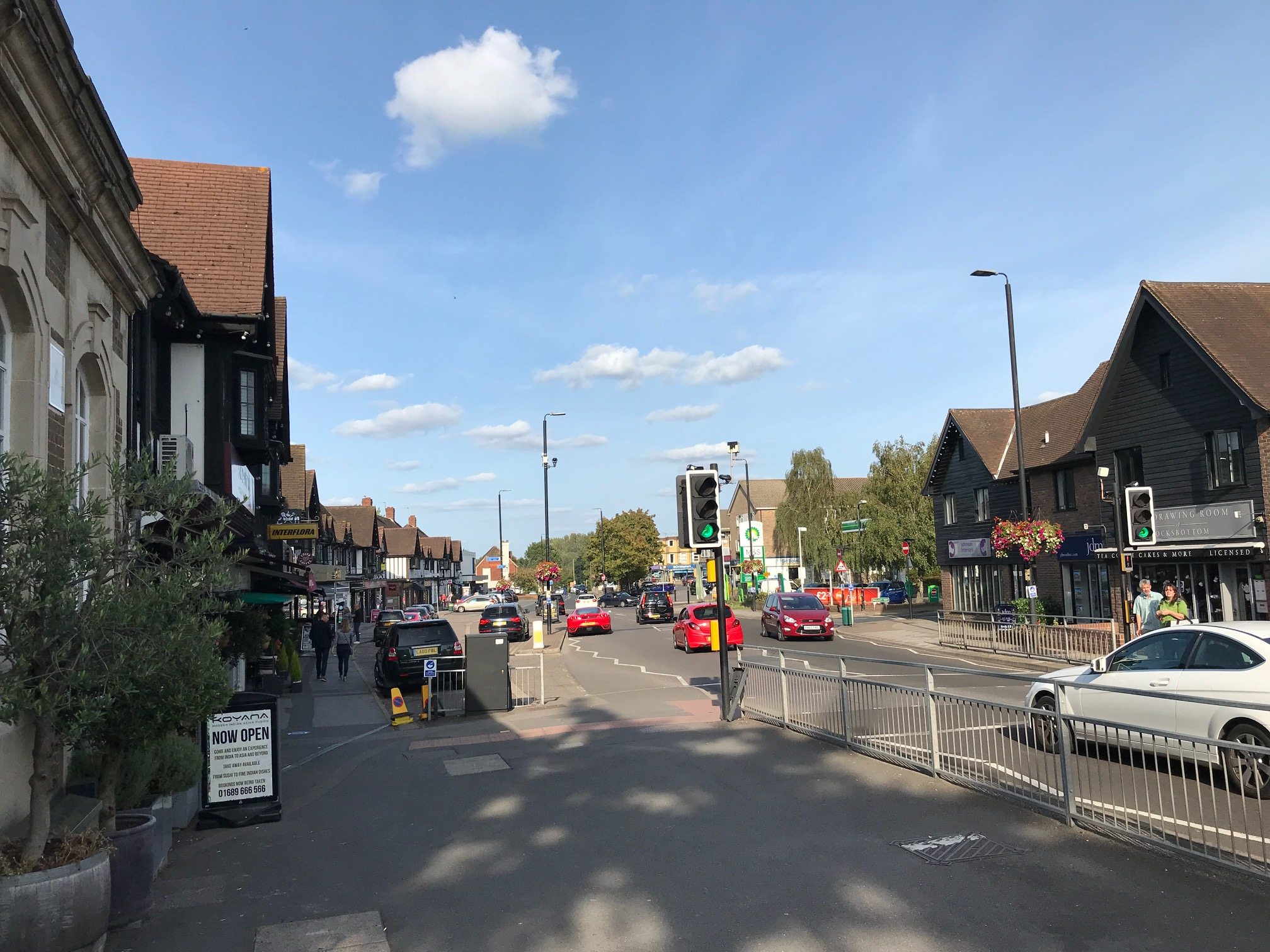
Shops along the Crofton Road

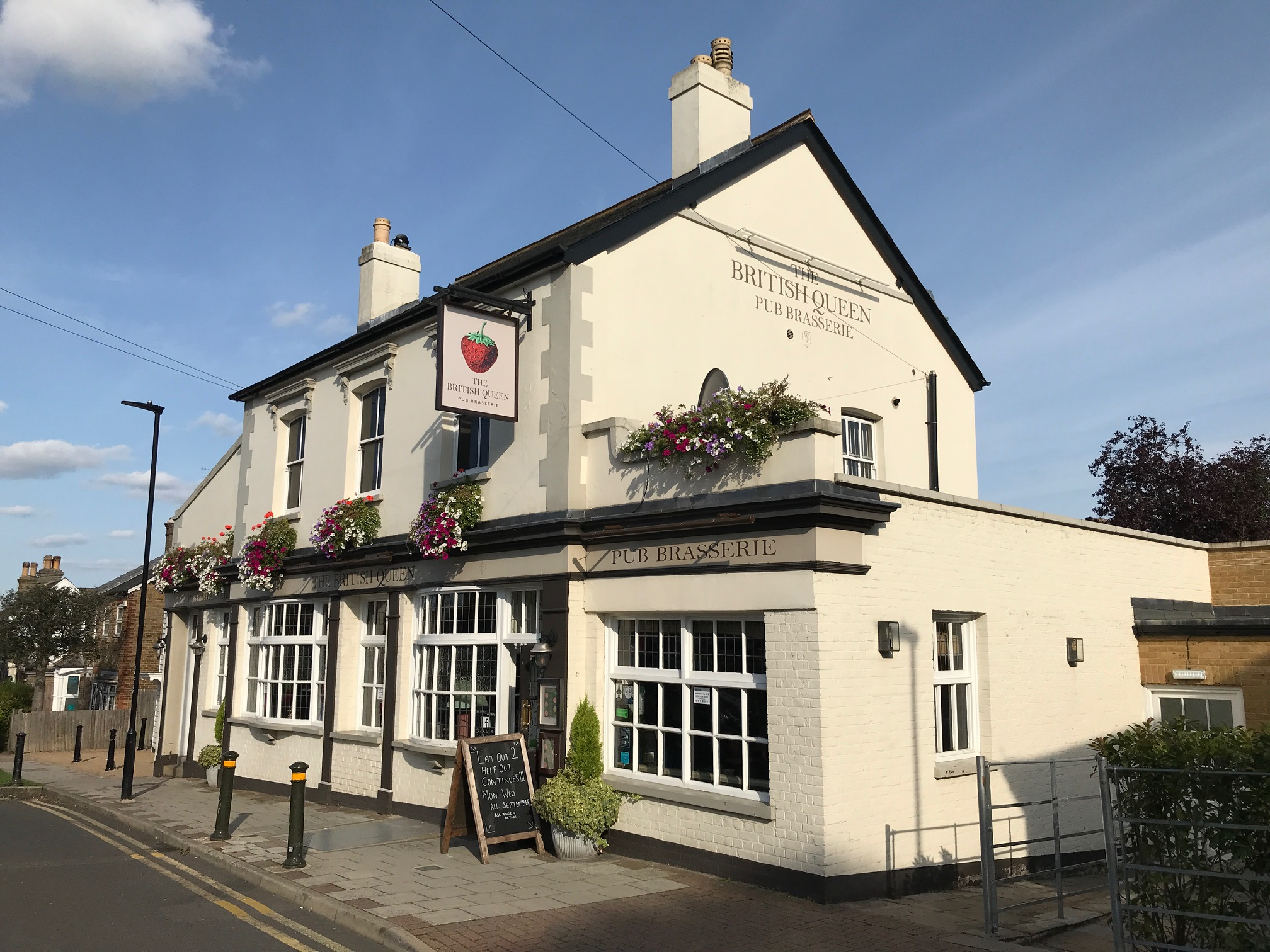
The British Queen pub

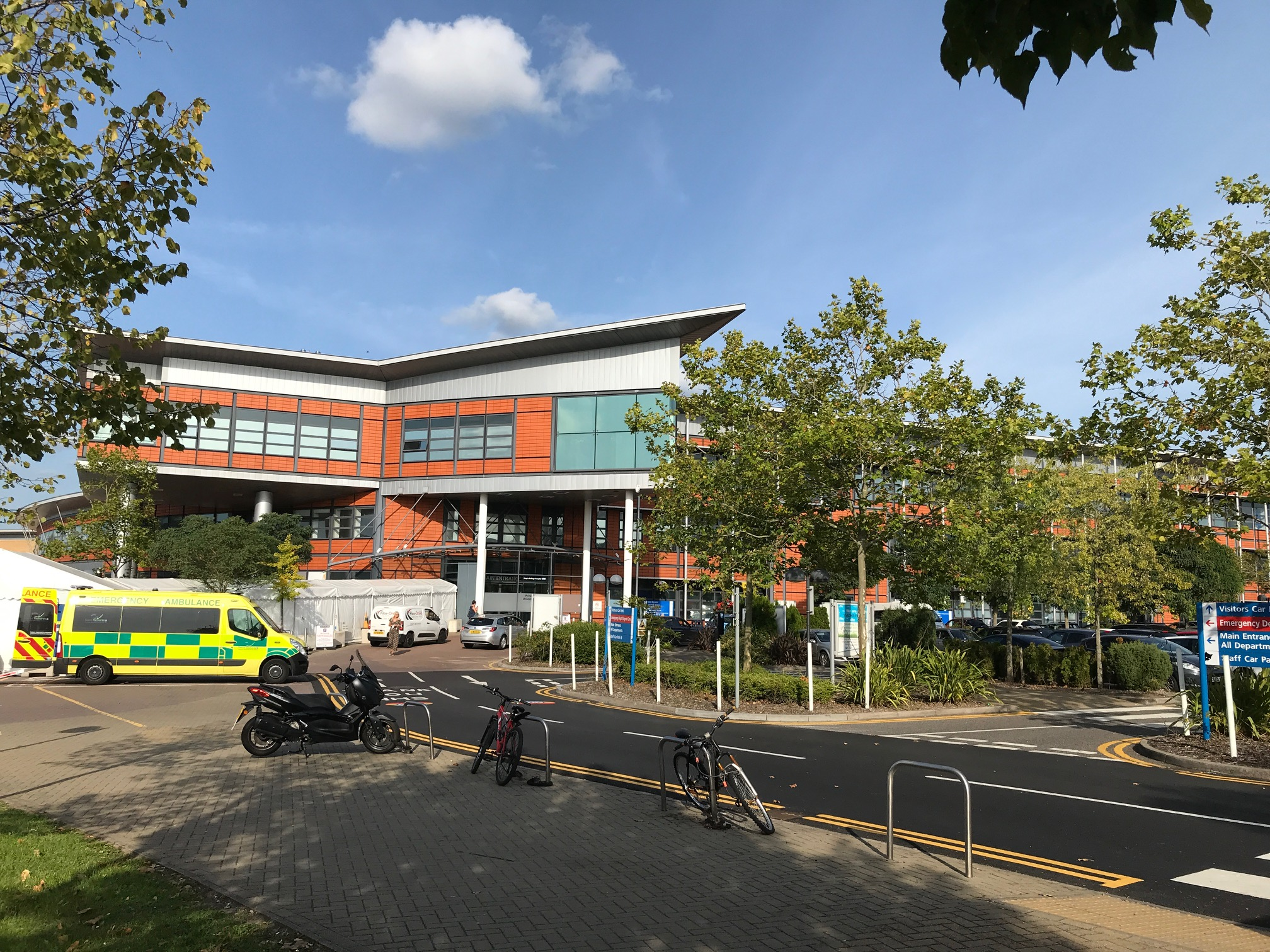
Princess Royal University Hospital

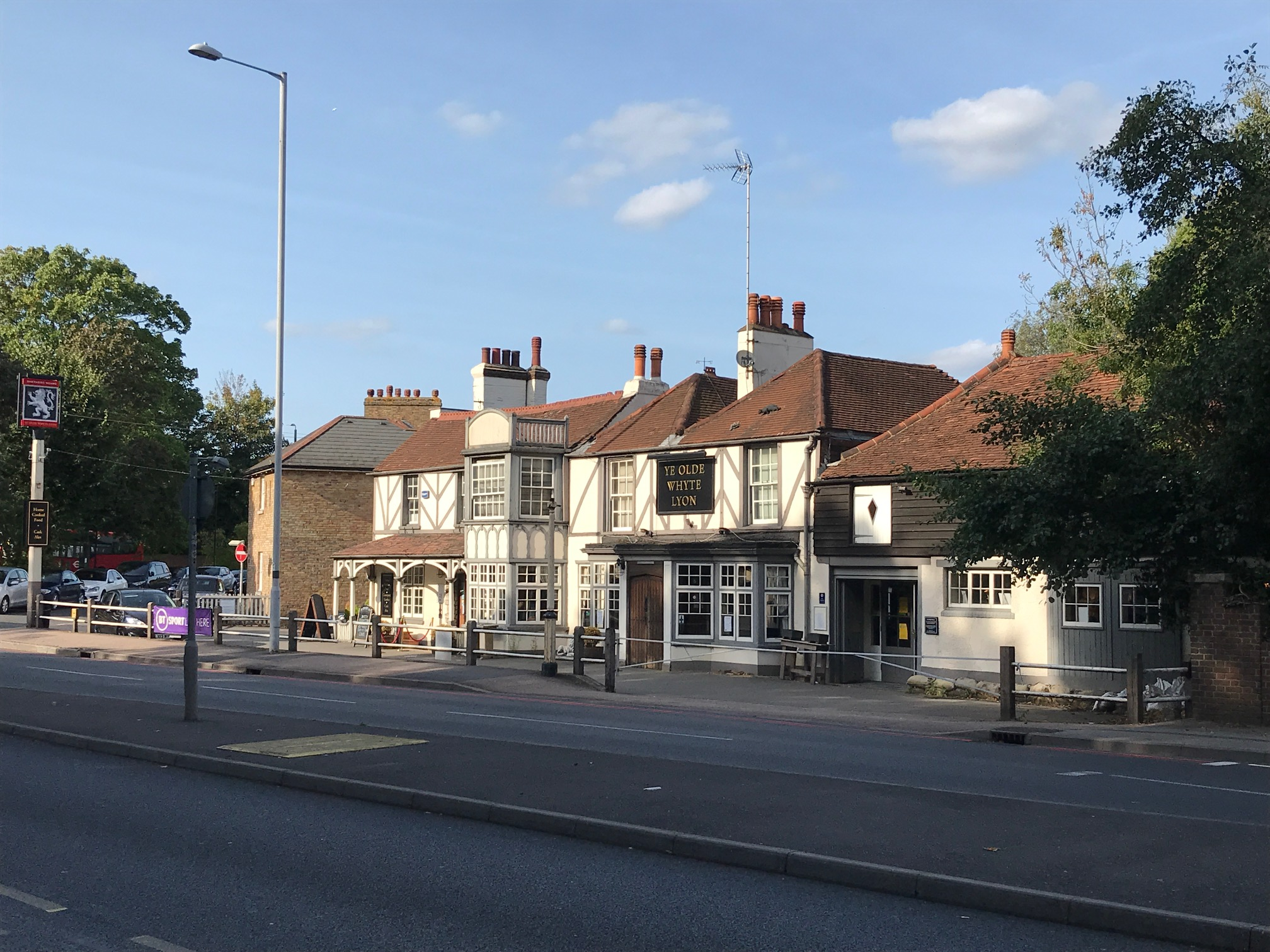
Ye Olde Whyte Lyon pub

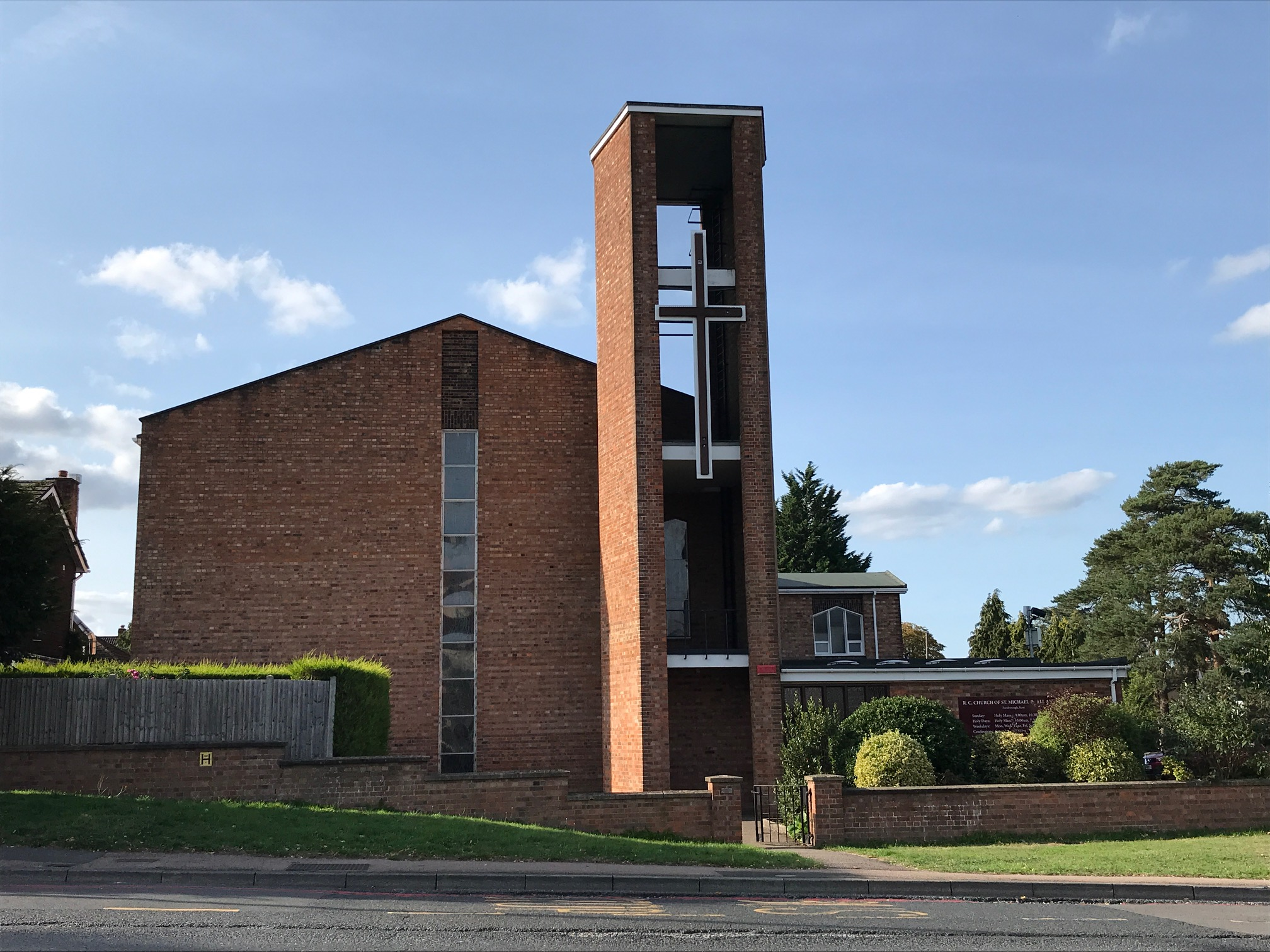
St Michael and All Saints Roman Catholic Church, built 1961–64

== In film ==
The former 'Fantail Restaurant', with views over and into the village, showing the land where now St Michael's Church stands, heavily planted with trees, with unidentified spots along the A21 nearby, may be seen in the 1954 film, Calling All Cars.

== Culture ==
Locksbottom hosts two sports clubs: Locksbottom Cricket Club who compete in the Kent County Village League Division 2. Their home ground is Tugmutton Common. Locksbottom Town FC are a Sunday League football team, who play in the Orpington & Bromley District Sunday Football League.
