= SE postcode area =

Postcode area within the United Kingdom

London SE
- Postcode area
- Location within the United Kingdom
- Coordinates: 51.466°N 0.032°W
- Sovereign state: United Kingdom
- Postcode area: SE
- Postcode area name: London SE
- Post towns: 1
- Postcode districts: 30
- Postcode sectors: 129
- Postcodes (live): 20,476
- Postcodes (total): 34,165
- Statistics as at May 2020

The SE (South Eastern) postcode area covers a broad area of the south and south-east of the London, England post town from the Albert Embankment to West Heath and the nearest edges of Sidcup and Selhurst. It loosely corresponds to the boroughs of Southwark, Lewisham and Greenwich plus indicated parts of the boroughs of Croydon (north), Lambeth (east), Bexley (west) and Bromley (northwest).

== Postal administration ==
The postcode area originated in 1857 as the SE district. In 1868 it gained some of the area of the short-lived S district, with the rest going to SW. It was divided into numbered districts in 1917, by giving the district closest to London that hosted the head office the suffix "1" and all others alphabetically based on a locally important parish, chapelry, topological or built environment feature administering or close to the local distribution office. SE28 is a late addition carved out of the existing districts SE2 and SE18 to reflect the building up of a new London district in what had been the meadows and marshes by the tidal Thames in the parish of Plumstead: Thamesmead.

Unlike SW, where a consecutive 50%, there ten, districts can more officially be traced into two alphabetical groups excluding SW1, SE has always technically followed the norm in that SE1 is the only head district. However SE19 was drawn up to serve the key distribution office serving Norwood after a complete alphabetical series so that those surrounding it and SE21 (Dulwich): SE20 and SE22 to SE27 are strictly alphabetical afresh (Anerley to West Norwood) but it has never technically been a "head district". The postcode area is part of the London post town. There are no dependent localities used in the postcode area. SE1P is a non-geographic postcode district for PO boxes located in SE1.

=== List of postcode districts ===
The approximate coverage of the postcode districts, with the historic postal district names shown in italics:

Postcode district	Post town	Coverage	Local authority area(s)
SE1	London	South Eastern head district: Bankside, Borough, South Bank, Lambeth (part), Southwark, Elephant and Castle, Bermondsey, Vauxhall (part), Peckham (part)	Lambeth, Southwark
SE1P	London		non-geographic for post office box numbers
SE2	London	Abbey Wood district: Abbey Wood, West Heath, Belvedere (part), Crossness, Thamesmead (part), Plumstead (part), Bostall Heath and Woods	Greenwich, Bexley
SE3	London	Blackheath district: Blackheath, Kidbrooke, Westcombe Park	Greenwich, Lewisham
SE4	London	Brockley district: Brockley, Crofton Park, Ladywell, Telegraph Hill	Lewisham
SE5	London	Camberwell district: Camberwell, Denmark Hill, Peckham	Lambeth, Southwark
SE6	London	Catford district: Catford, Bellingham, Hither Green (part), Rushey Green	Lewisham
SE7	London	Charlton district: Charlton	Greenwich
SE8	London	Deptford district: Deptford, Evelyn, Rotherhithe (part), St John's	Lewisham, Greenwich, Southwark
SE9	London	Eltham district: Eltham, Mottingham, New Eltham, Well Hall, Avery Hill (part), Falconwood (part), Sidcup (part), Chinbrook (part), Longlands (part) Kidbrooke (part), Shooter's Hill (part)	Greenwich, Bromley, Bexley, Lewisham
SE10	London	Greenwich district: Greenwich, Maze Hill, Greenwich Peninsula	Greenwich, Lewisham
SE11	London	Kennington district: Kennington, Lambeth (part), Vauxhall (part), Oval (part)	Lambeth, Southwark
SE12	London	Lee district: Lee, Mottingham, Grove Park, Chinbrook, Hither Green (part), Eltham (part), Horn Park	Lewisham, Greenwich, Bromley
SE13	London	Lewisham district: Lewisham, Hither Green, Ladywell	Lewisham, Greenwich
SE14	London	New Cross district: New Cross, Telegraph Hill	Lewisham
SE15	London	Peckham district: Peckham, Nunhead, South Bermondsey (part)	Southwark, Lewisham
SE16	London	Rotherhithe district: Rotherhithe, Bermondsey, Surrey Quays, South Bermondsey (part) New Cross Gate, Lewisham,	Southwark, Lewisham
SE17	London	Walworth district: Walworth, Elephant and Castle (Part), Kennington (part), Newington	Southwark
SE18	London	Woolwich district: Woolwich, Royal Arsenal, Plumstead (part), East Wickham (part), Shooter's Hill	Greenwich, Bexley
SE19	London	Norwood district: Upper Norwood, Crystal Palace, Gipsy Hill (part)	Croydon, Lambeth, Southwark, Bromley
SE20	London	Anerley district: Anerley, Crystal Palace (part), Penge, Beckenham (part)	Bromley, Croydon
SE21	London	Dulwich district: Dulwich, Dulwich Village, Tulse Hill (part), West Dulwich	Southwark, Lambeth
SE22	London	East Dulwich district: East Dulwich, Peckham Rye	Southwark
SE23	London	Forest Hill district: Forest Hill, Honor Oak, Crofton Park (part), Perry Vale	Lewisham, Southwark
SE24	London	Herne Hill district: Herne Hill, Tulse Hill (part), West Dulwich (part)	Lambeth, Southwark
SE25	London	South Norwood district: South Norwood, Selhurst (part), Thornton Heath (part), Woodside (part)	Croydon
SE26	London	Sydenham district: Sydenham, Crystal Palace (part)	Lewisham, Bromley, Southwark
SE27	London	West Norwood district: West Norwood, Gipsy Hill (part), Tulse Hill (part)	Lambeth
SE28	London	Thamesmead district: Thamesmead	Greenwich, Bexley

== Boundaries ==
SE1 has a very long tidal Thames frontage and is in Central London as is SE11, named after Kennington, close to Westminster. SE2–SE18 are spread across the north and east of the postcode area; enquiring into their naming system explains how SE2, SE7, SE8, SE10, SE16 and SE18 also front the river. Postcode districts SE19–SE27 form a group in the southwest. The later addition, SE28, is in the northeast corner of the first group. The postcode area maps roughly to the combined area of the London Borough of Southwark, London Borough of Lewisham and Royal Borough of Greenwich. the eastern part of the London Borough of Lambeth, the northern part of the London Borough of Croydon, the western part of the London Borough of Bexley and the northwestern part of the London Borough of Bromley are within the postcode area.

In 2002, some residents in West Heath, a slight projection with neighbouring areas, wished to have their postcodes changed from SE2 to the adjacent DA7 postcode district, citing higher insurance for their houses, belongings and cars as reasons to change. Royal Mail has said it will not consider changes to postcodes for these reasons.

== Map ==
SE postcode area map, showing postcode districts in red and post towns in grey text, with links to nearby BR, CR, DA, E, EC, IG, RM, SW and WC postcode areas.

== See also ==
- Postcode Address File
- List of postcode areas in the United Kingdom
- London postal district
