= Parks and open spaces in the London Borough of Lewisham =

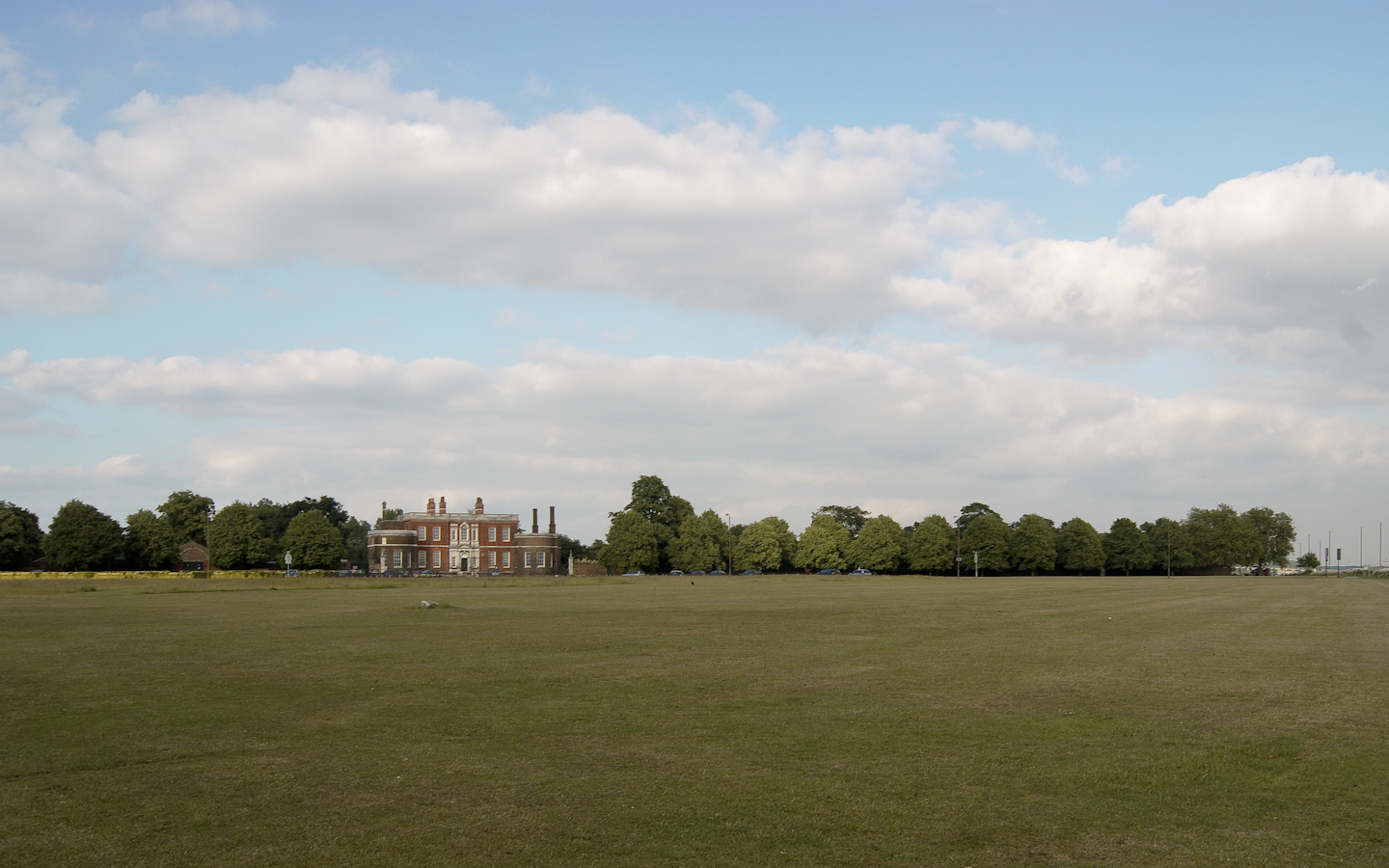
Blackheath is one of the largest areas of open space in Greater London

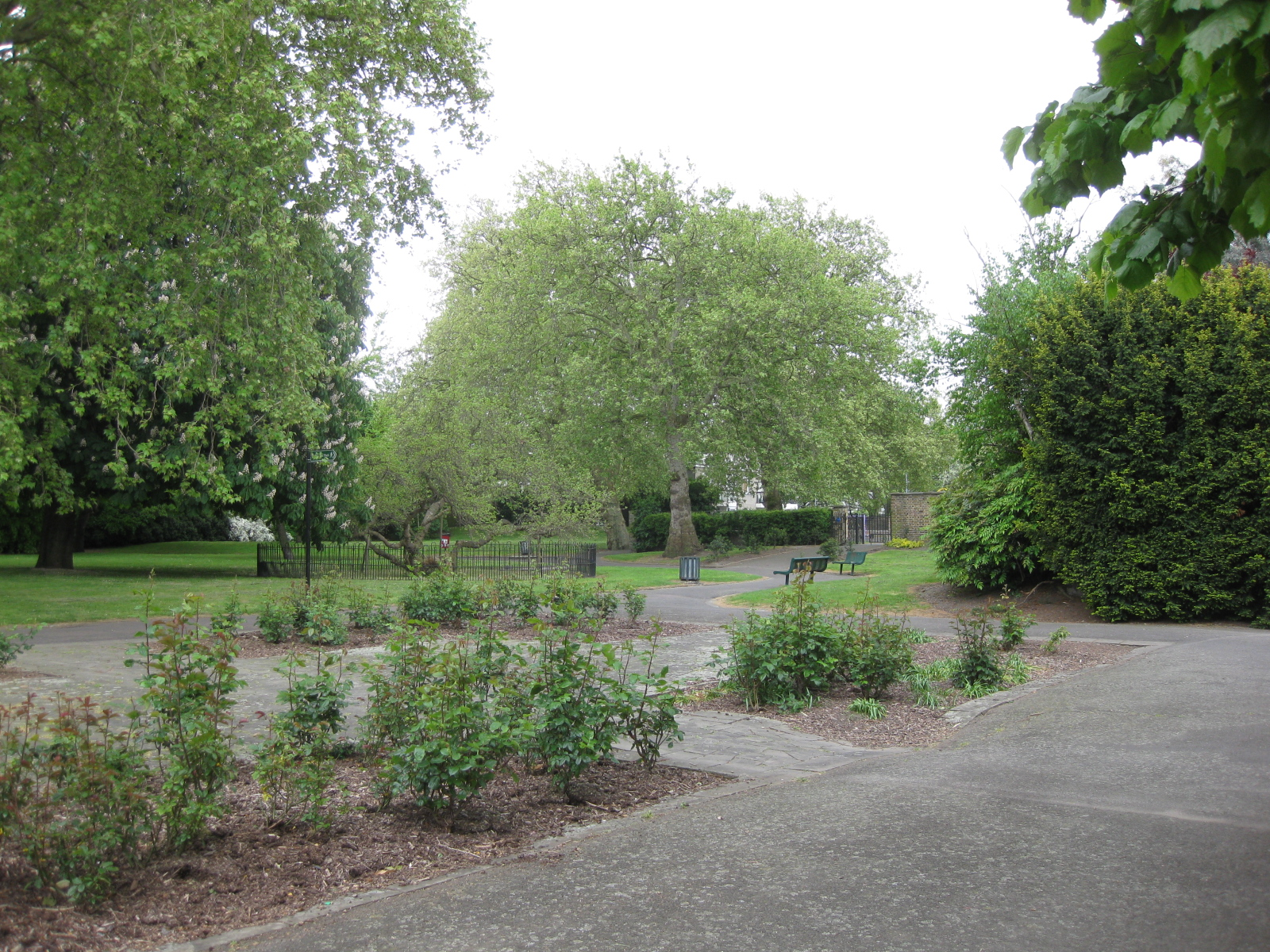
Sayes Court Park, an historic Deptford garden, designed by 17th-century diarist and gardener John Evelyn

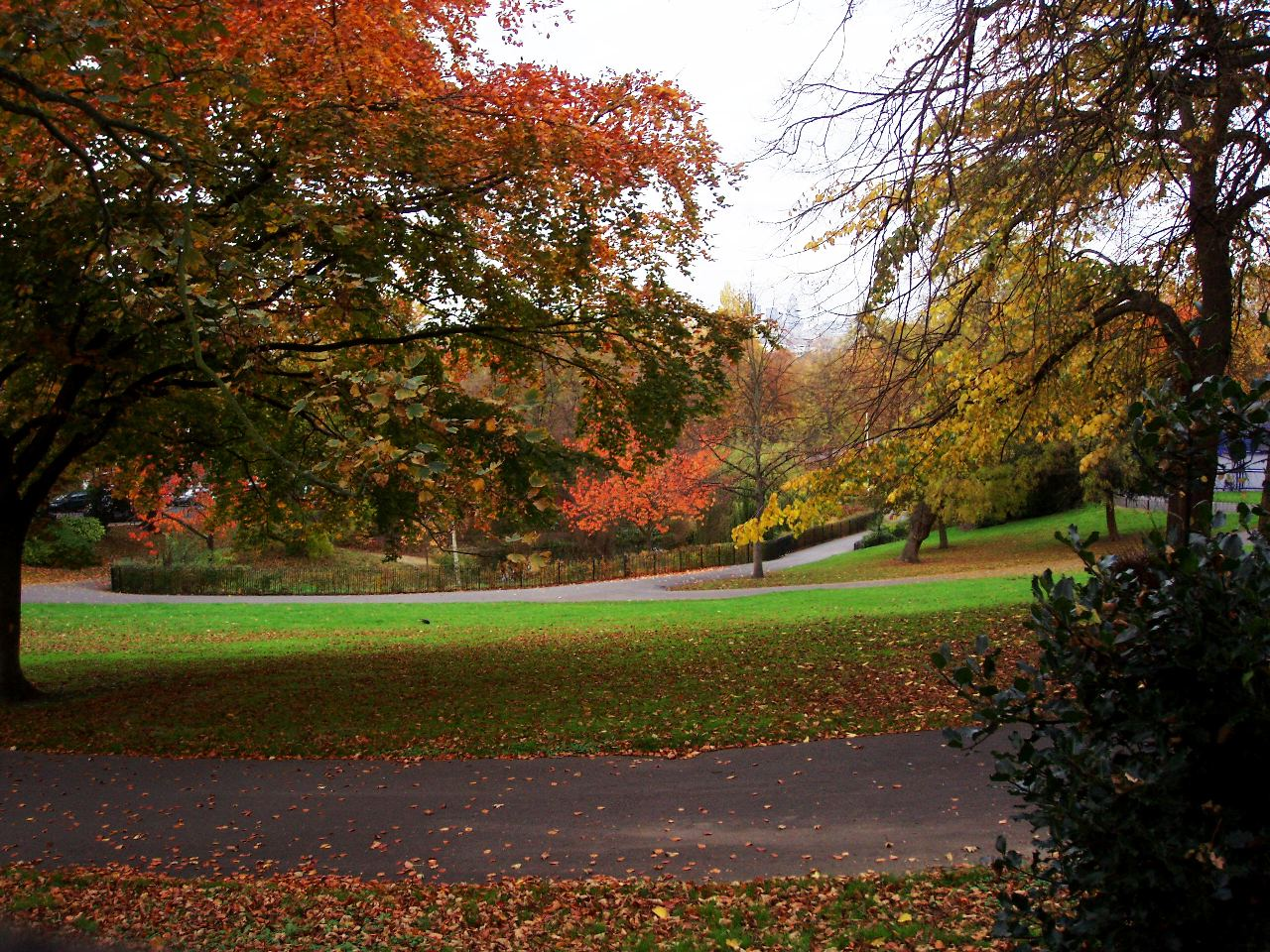
The lower end of Telegraph Hill Park

Lewisham parks and open spaces are part of the "green lung" of London and include a diverse range of sites, from small urban parks and gardens to one of the most historic natural landscapes in Greater London at Blackheath. While overall control rests with London Borough of Lewisham, management of borough-owned parks and their facilities is contracted out to Glendale Grounds Management.

== Key sites ==
Nature conservation

Together with other smaller sites, such as ponds, woods, and railside areas there is a total of 1185 acres (474ha) of land defined as Sites of Importance for Nature Conservation. These include:

- Beckenham Place Park – part of the Green Chain Walk and Capital Ring.
- Brockley and Ladywell Cemeteries – adjoining Victorian cemeteries of both historic and nature conservation importance.
- Blackheath – one of the largest open spaces in Greater London, Blackheath is an historic London landscape and an important natural habitat. It is jointly managed by Lewisham and Royal Borough of Greenwich. Blackheath is not common but manorial waste.
- Grove Park Nature Reserve - a 4.6 ha (11 acres) site including woodland, shrubland and meadow, opened in 1984.
- Hither Green Triangle – grassland and wooded area between railway lines that was declared a nature reserve in 1993.
- Deptford Creek – tidal reach of a Thames tributary.
- Sue Godfrey Nature Park at Deptford – reclaimed from industrial wasteland and named after an environmental campaigner.

Local nature reserves are: Beckenham Place Park, Brookmill Road, Burnt Ash Pond, Dacres Wood, Downham Woodland Walk and Sue Godfrey Nature Park.

Local parks

There 45 parks in Lewisham. Apart from those shown above as nature conservation areas, other parks include:

- Brookmill Park – formerly a small recreation site by the River Ravensbourne, it was substantially expanded in the 1920s and 1950s and extended again in 1998. Now part of National Cycle Route 21 (the Waterlink Way) to the Sussex coast.
- Chinbrook Meadows – on the River Quaggy east of Grove Park railway station and part of the South East London Green Chain.
- Deptford Park – owned by the Borough since 1897.
- Folkestone Gardens – 1970s park close to Deptford Park and created from an area of land badly damaged by a V-2 rocket in 1945. Part of the London Cycle Network, and notable for its large pond and children's play area.
- Forster Memorial Park – east of the A21 road in the Whitefoot and Bellingham area.
- Hilly Fields - a large park located between Brockley and Ladywell. The park has a stone circle and expansive views across London. The weekly Parkrun held here is one of the steepest in the country.
- Ladywell Fields– situated alongside the railway line between Ladywell, Catford Bridge and Catford railway stations, the area contains sports facilities (athletics track, tennis courts, and a sports hall), together with a small nature reserve.
- Manor House Gardens - former gardens and ornamental pond of the Manor House in Lee.
- Mayow Park, Lower Sydenham – oldest municipal park, opened 1878.
- Mountsfield Park, Catford – opened 1905 and used by Charlton Athletic F.C. for two seasons.
- Northbrook Park opened 1903, 9 acre park in Grove Park, on Baring Road,
- Sayes Court Park, Deptford – Park on the Thames Path.
- Sydenham Wells Park, Upper Sydenham – medicinal springs, water features and formal gardens, as well as multi sports ball court and tennis courts.
- Telegraph Hill Park, New Cross – named after semaphore telegraph once placed there and refurbished in 2004.
