= Grove Park Sidings =

Coordinates: 51.442°N 0.010°E

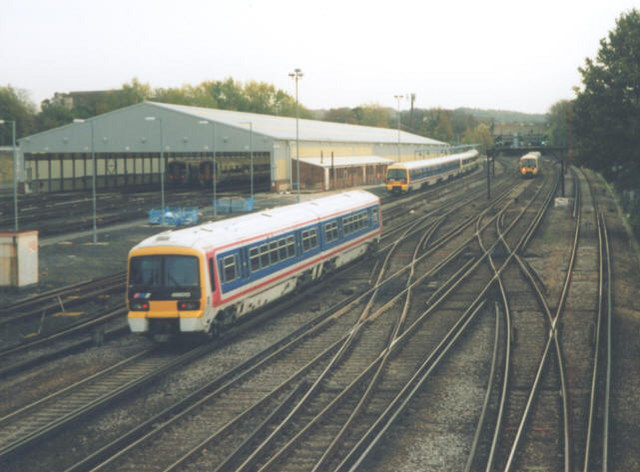
The large carriage shed of the Down sidings in 2004.

Grove Park Sidings is a large stabling complex for suburban commuter trains in Lewisham, South East London. It is situated approximately halfway between Hither Green Station and Grove Park station.

Grove Park Sidings were previously named Hither Green Sidings, until sidings closer to Hither Green were built and took that name, causing the site to be renamed Grove Park Sidings.

It consists of two sets of sidings, one on either side of the Main line which are linked by a pedestrian footbridge. On the Down side are Bramdean sidings and the large carriage shed, whilst on the Up side are St Mildreds sidings. There is also a carriage washing plant on the inlet road of Down sidings.

The site is owned by Network Rail and operated by Southeastern and provides berthing for a range of different EMUs. EMU types that are stabled there include Class 465 Networker, Class 466 Networker, Class 375 Express Electrostar, Class 375 Outer Suburban Electrostar and Class 376 Suburban Electrostar.

Grove Park is one of Southeastern's driver depots.

Nearby is Hither Green Traction Maintenance Depot (TMD), which is operated by Balfour Beatty Rail for their On-Track-Machines and Plant equipment. To the west of Grove Park Sidings is Hither Green Cemetery, and to the east, is Grove Park Nature Reserve, and Northbrook Park.
