= Grove Park Nature Reserve =

Protected area in London, England

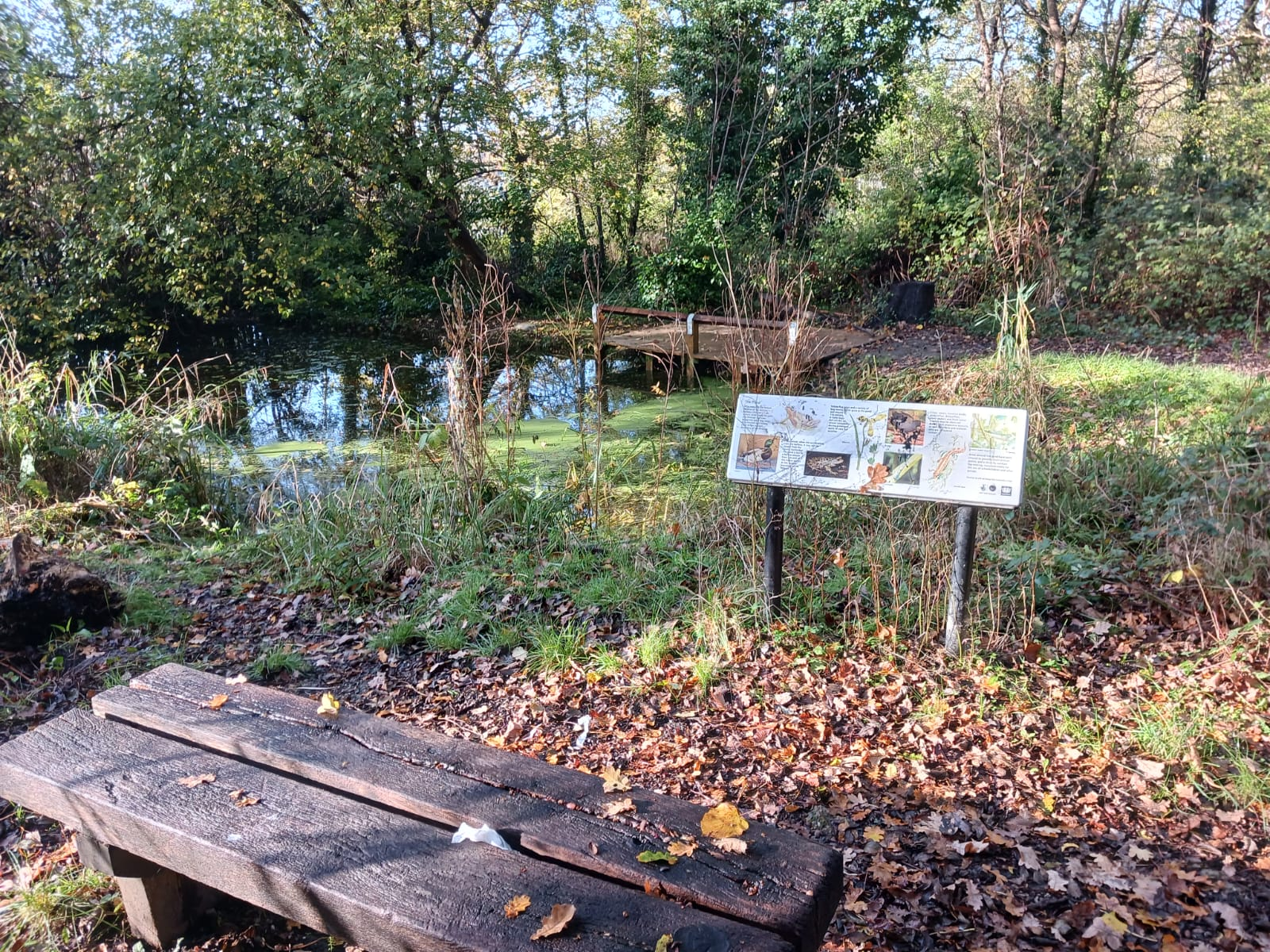
- The pond in Grove Park Nature Reserve; November 2022

- Location within London Borough of Lewisham
- Type: Nature reserve
- Location: Grove Park in the London Borough of Lewisham, London, United Kingdom
- Coordinates: 51.437°N 0.016°E
- Area: 4.6 ha (11 acres)
- Created: 1984 (managed); 1987 (acquired freehold)
- Owner: London Borough of Lewisham
- Operator: Lewisham London Borough Council and Friends of Grove Park Nature Reserve
- Status: Open all year
- Awards: Green Flag Award (2009-present)
- Public transit: Grove Park railway station, buses: 261, 273, 284, 124, 126, 136, 181, 638, N136
- Website: Grove Park Nature Reserve, at Lewisham.gov.uk groveparknaturereserve.wordpress.com

Grove Park Nature Reserve (previously Hither Green Nature Reserve) is a nature reserve in Grove Park within the London Borough of Lewisham, southeast London, United Kingdom and is bordered by a railway line to the west, residential streets to the east and north, and more woodland and a footpath to the south where the site's entrance is located. The reserve is 4.6 ha (11 acres) in size, being 400 m (440 yd) long north to south, and around 150 m (160 yd) wide, containing woodland in the south and centre and shrubland and meadow in the north where the site narrows to only 50 m (55 yd) in width. Baring Road, the A2212 road with several bus routes is located immediately to the east of the reserve, and the centre of Grove Park including Grove Park railway station is around 750 m (820 yd) to the south. The entrance is at the southern end of the site, from a footpath named Railway Children Walk, part of the South East London Green Chain and is joined with reserve's circular path by a shorter path with a footbridge passing over an unnamed stream which flows westward and empties into a small pond. The nature reserve, which is free to enter is accessed by local primary schools for forest school trips and is also used for dog walking and fruit picking.

Several species of tree grow in the woodland including oak, birch, and ash among others, and the northern meadow area is home to numerous wildflowers such as meadow vetchling, and common vetch. Eurasian blackcap, European green woodpecker, owls, and kestrels, are among the 39 bird species which breed in Grove Park Nature Reserve, and other animals such as bats, grass snakes, hedgehogs, and common lizards also live at the site. Many insect species are seen in the reserve, including nineteen species of butterfly and yellow meadow ant which have made numerous ant hills in the northern meadow. Amphibians including the common frog, smooth newt, and common toad have made their home in the reserve's pond.

In the eighteenth century the area that is now Grove Park Nature Reserve and much of the surrounding area was agricultural fields, the buildings of Burnt Ash Farm were located to the north of the site then by the 1860s several other farm buildings appeared to the west, northeast and southeast. The South Eastern Main Line railway was built through Grove Park in 1865 followed by Grove Park railway station in 1871. In the late nineteenth century, and early twentieth century, tennis courts and residential gardens occupied the area at the southern end of the reserve. From 1894 to 1899, writer Edith Nesbit lived in a large house named Three Gables on Baring Road, her garden backed up to the railway line and overlapped with what is now the southern part of the nature reserve. It is suggested the location inspired her children's book The Railway Children which was published in 1906, and the footpath on the southern side of the reserve was named Railway Children Walk in her memory. During the mid-twentieth century, up to the 1980s, much of the land was used as allotments and was of particular importance during the Dig For Victory campaign during World War II, when there was also an anti-aircraft battery located on the site.

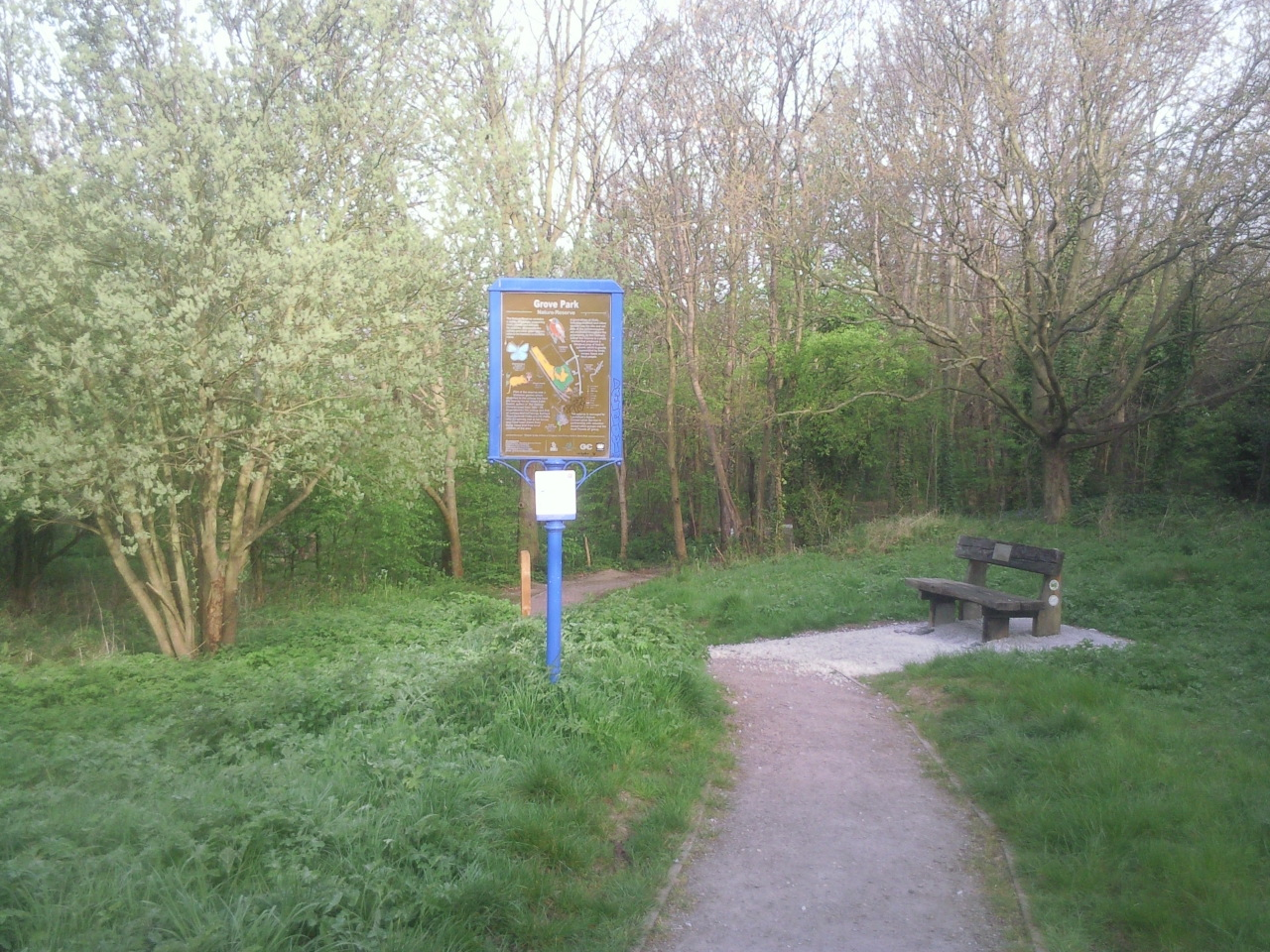
Sign and path, near the entrance of Grove Park Nature Reserve

Although the site had been used informally by local residents for recreation for many years it officially became a nature reserve, in 1984, as Hither Green Nature Reserve when the Lewisham London Borough Council agreed to manage the area under licence from British Rail, then in 1987 Lewisham Council acquired freehold of the land, following a public enquiry the previous year in which planning permission for housing on land just to the north was granted. In 2007 the sites name was changed to Grove Park Nature Reserve, and an organisation named Friends of Grove Park Nature Reserve was set up. Since that year the National Lottery Community Fund awarded the organisation over £30,000, which has paid for new signs, seats, improvements to the entrance and the path, installing bat boxes and a sculpture and several open day activities. The Nature Reserve has won the Green Flag Award several times since 2009. In 2020 Grove Park Nature Reserve and Railway Children Walk were temporarily closed so UK Power Networks could complete works, to maintain the electricity supply network. Although there were delays caused by ground conditions, and the COVID-19 pandemic, the site was opened again in November 2020 after the grassland and pathway was returned to its previous state. In September 2020, it was reported that one of the entry points to Railway Children Walk and Grove Park Nature Reserve was unlawfully closed and locked, and some of the trees had been deliberately damaged. Permission to remove some of the trees and build a trailer park on the land had been applied for but was refused in August 2020, as Lewisham Council had issue with the proposal to erect larger buildings on the land and the plans to cut down a number of trees.

There are proposals for future development of Grove Park Nature Reserve and surrounding green space. Grove Park Neighbourhood Forum has plans for the 7.2 ha (18 acres) of open land, stretching 4.5 km (2.8 mi), from the South Circular in the north, to past Elmstead Woods railway station in the south, including the nature reserve, to be turned into a new larger park. The land covered in the proposal covers, in addition to Grove Park Nature Reserve, Northbrook Park, Hither Green Cemetery, Railway Children Forest Garden, Chinbrook Meadows, Grove Park Cemetery, Sundridge Park Golf Course, Elmstead Woods and several other open areas. Planned development to Grove Park Nature Reserve includes increasing the number of paths that access the site from the outside, and constructing a lookout tower overlooking the railway line. The proposal was submitted to Lewisham Council in 2019 and may stop any new developments being built on the area. The aims of the proposal are to protect biodiversity of threatened species in the area, and to provide opportunities for outdoor learning, recreation and well-being. The new proposed park would follow the railway line, and suggested names include Grove Park Urban National Park, The Railway Children District Park and Railway Children Urban National Park taking the name from the Edith Nesbit novel, said to have been inspired by the location.

== Description ==
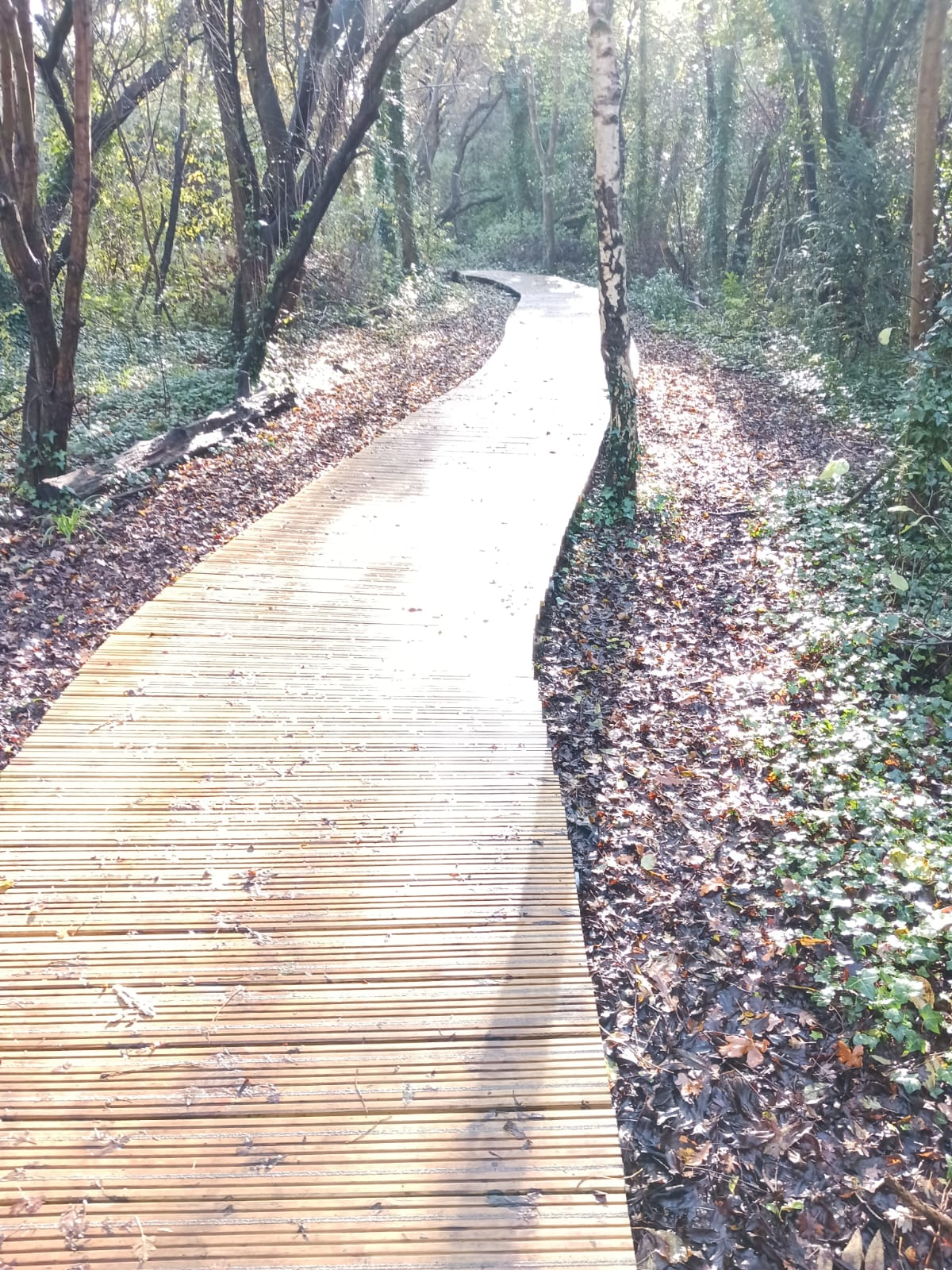
Wooden path in the woodland

Grove Park Nature Reserve is roughly 400 m (440 yd) long in a northwest to southeast direction, following the railway line, and around 150 m (160 yd) wide at the centre, but narrowing to 50 m (55 yd) at the northern end, giving it an area of about 4.6 ha (11 acres). The site is mostly woodland, with some shrubland, it is more open grassland on the western side, where the ground slopes down to meet an iron fence which separates the reserve from the railway line. The southern and eastern area of the reserve is more heavily covered in trees, the northern and western areas are more open grassland, with scattered trees and shrubs, the northern grassland and meadow area narrows to a thinner strip of land about one third the width of the woodland section at the site's centre. The reserve is free to enter and is open to the public all year round. At the southern end of the site, there is a small algae covered pond, which is home to frogs, newts and toads. Along the southern edge of the reserve, a small unnamed stream rises from a seep and flows south-westward, emptying into the pond, the footpath running from the site entrance northward into the reserve crosses over this stream on a small footbridge. The north of the reserve has an open field, where, alongside the path there is a hollow which was previously another pond, but is long dried up. There are wooden benches and tables in the preserve, where the trees are thinner, and a roughly circular path going around the southern half of the site, which is a dirt path on the south side near the entrance, but a raised wooden path closer to the centre where the ground is more uneven and wet. In an opening, a circular arrangement of benches have been installed around a pedistal, resembling a classroom, to aid educational visits. There are also a number of signs inside Grove Park Nature Reserve, telling visitors about the local history and wildlife of the site and surrounding area, some of these were paid for by lottery funding.

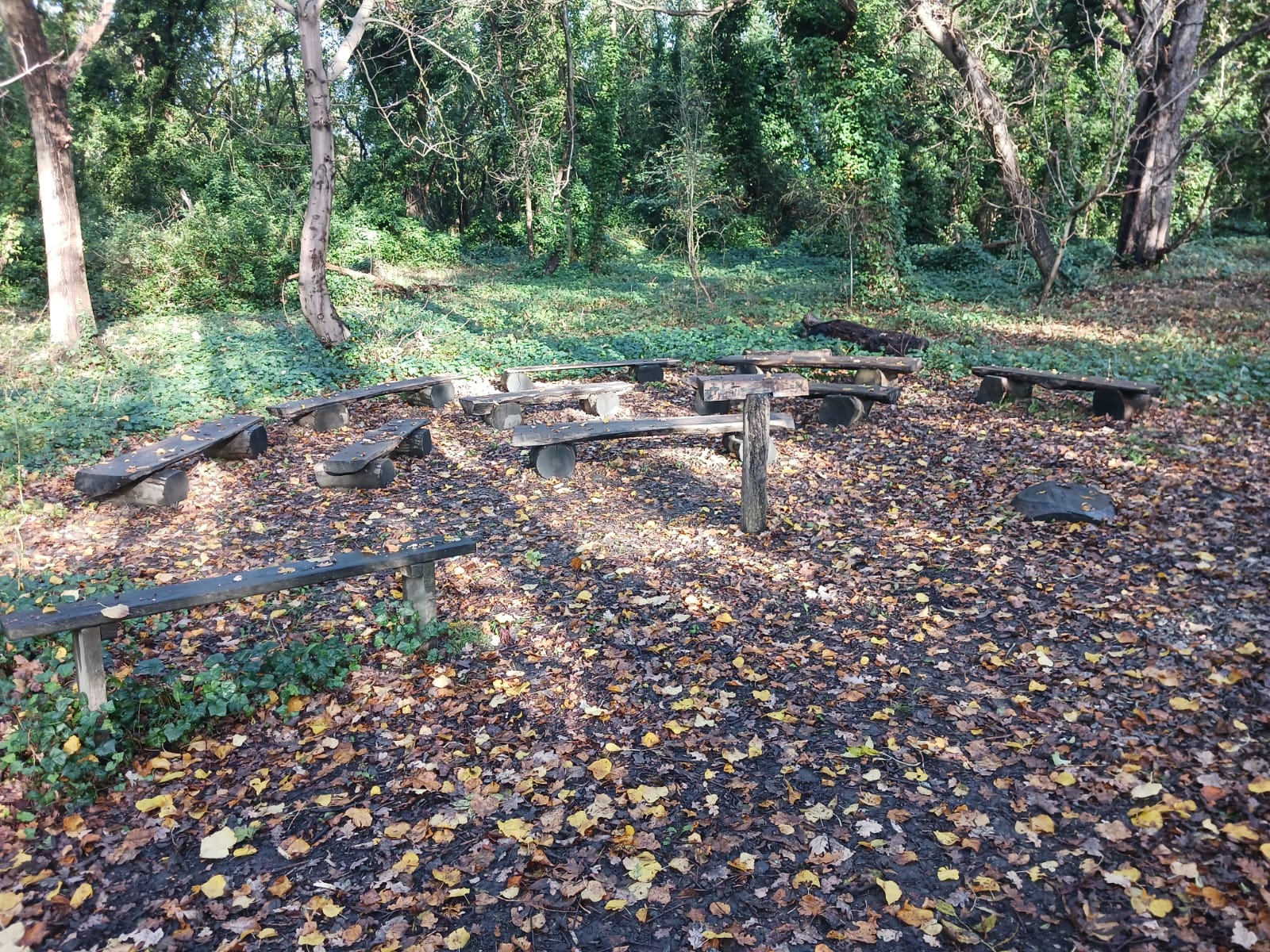
Wooden benches in the woodland, used for forest school lessons

On the northern side the site has wooden fences separating it from residential roads, Bramdean Crescent and Oak Apple Court, and the eastern side has fences backing onto Hoser Avenue, Palace View, Baring Close and Stratfield House, which are residential cul-de-sac roads, coming off of Baring Road. On the eastern side of the reserve near the path and within the woodland, are the remains of an old cast iron fence which was part of the boundary fence of the previous residential garden. An unlit 473 m (517 yd) footpath named Railway Children Walk, runs along the southern boundary of the reserve, joining Stratfield House and Baring Road on the east side to Reigate Road in Downham on the west side, with a stepped footbridge carrying it over the railway line. Railway Children Walk is where the reserve's main entrance is located, and also contains a simple wooden model of a train, that can be sat on. Grove Park Nature Reserve and Railway Children Walk are part of the South East London Green Chain, and the Capital Ring, linked sections of footpaths in open areas around London. There are also gates into the reserve on Hoser Avenue and Oak Apple Court on the eastern and northern side, but these gates are usually not open to the public.

Grove Park Nature Reserve is accessed by local primary schools for forest school trips, the site is also used for dog walking and plum and blackberry picking.

== Wildlife ==
=== Plants ===
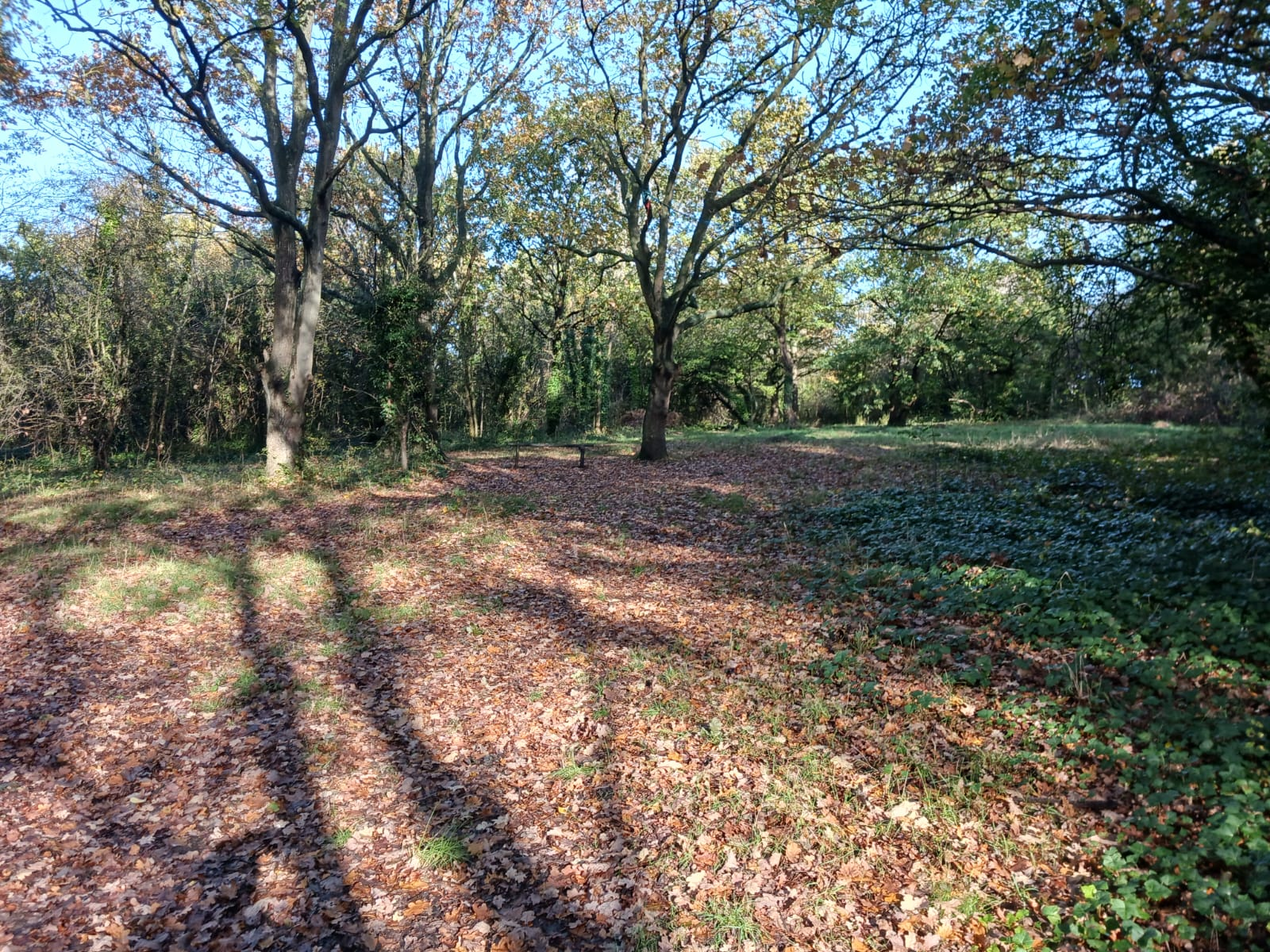
Various tree species in the woodland

Grove Park Nature Reserve contains a diverse number of trees other plants including, oak, birch, ash, hornbeam, horse chestnut, common lime, poplar, plum, red apple, privet, snowberry, sycamore, English elm, goat willow, hawthorn, field maple, and blackberry. ivy is also present, covering much of the ground, and trunks of the older trees.

The area around the site entrance contains a small piece of rough grassland encircled by woodland. This grassland has many species of plants including bramble, buttercups, clovers, ragwort, and hogweed, as well as bluebells, winter aconite and snowdrops which have been planted there.

The main area of woodland in the nature reserve is just northwest of the entrance and occupies most of the southern area of the site. This woodland was previously a residential garden, and contains ash, oak and a small number of hornbeams, horse chestnuts, common limes, and poplars, much of which is covered in ivy and is home to many different insects. elder, hawthorn and dog rose are also present in the woodland, and in early spring, miniature daffodils and wood anemone sometimes grow. The small pond is located in the southern part of the woodland, near the railway line, and has been planted with yellow iris, soft rush, watercress and brooklime.

The central area has a small opening of grassland with scattered scrub and wildflowers including meadow vetchling, common vetch, creeping cinquefoil and wild strawberry, left behind from the land's previous use as allotments. Just north of the opening of grassland is a thicket of plum trees, a remnant of the lands former use as an orchard, which many birds, wasps, foxes as well as local people eat.

The far north of the reserve is a larger strip of open meadow containing wildflowers such as common knapweed, common bird's-foot trefoil, tufted vetch, wild carrot, stone parsley agrimony, hedge bedstraw, and zigzag clover, which attract many species of butterflies and moths The woodland to the eastern side contains a small hawthorn hedge, a larger privet hedge, and snowberry among the undergrowth, which volunteers often remove due to its invasive nature. Grove Park Nature Reserve is the only substantial area of calcareous grassland in the London Borough of Lewisham, and the strip of grassland following the railway line along the southwestern side of the reserve has a continuous tract of tor-grass, a grass which likes calcareous soil and is rare in London being the only site where it grows in the Lewisham borough.

=== Animals ===
Many species of birds are seen inside Grove Park Nature Reserve including, Eurasian blackcap, European green woodpecker, great spotted woodpecker, willow warbler, owls, whinchats, wheatears, kestrels, Eurasian sparrowhawks, stonechats, spotted flycatchers, common whitethroats, common chaffinch, lesser whitethroat, and Eurasian bullfinch; altogether over 39 species of bird are known to have bred in the reserve. Other animals that live in the nature reserve include bats, grass snakes, hedgehogs, wood mouse, honey bees, and several protected species, such as slow worms, common lizards, stag beetles, house sparrows, and vesper bats. Nineteen species of butterfly have been recorded at the site, which is thought to be some of the last remaining urban habitat for five species of hairstreak butterfly. Moths are also seen in the reserve, including the cinnabar moth, the blood-vein, and the blackneck, as well as other invertebrates including, the long-winged conehead grasshopper, ant species, Stenama westwoodii, and the weevil Bruchela rufipes.

Amphibians have been seen living in the pond in the south of the reserve including the common frog, smooth newt, and common toad. The grasslands in the northern part contain many ant hills belonging to the yellow meadow ant, which the European green woodpecker often feed on, and the common lizard also uses the grassland to bask in the sun. Many birds, wasps, foxes and local people visit the thicket in the centre of the reserve to eat the plums growing there. The meadow and wildflowers in the north of Grove Park Nature Reserve attract many species of butterflies and moths including the common blue, meadow brown, gatekeeper, red admiral and the burnet moth.

== Location ==
Grove Park Nature Reserve is located within the SE12 postcode, in Grove Park area and electoral ward of the London Borough of Lewisham, southeast London, United Kingdom.

The railway line, which forms the ward and postcode boundary, is immediately southwest of the site, Hither Green Cemetery in Hither Green and the SE6 postcode area, lies west of the site on the other side of the tracks, and the residential roads to the south across the railway line are part of Downham, in the BR1 postcode area. The sheds of Grove Park Sidings are to the south of the site, on the same side of the tracks, and Hither Green marshalling yard is located northwest of the reserve on the opposite side of the railway line. Northbrook Park is also close by, being around 600 m (660 yd) to the north of the nature reserve.

== Transport ==
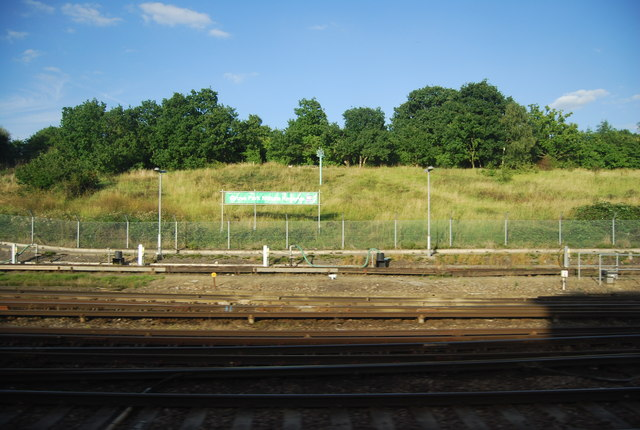
The meadow area seen from the across the railway line

Grove Park Nature Reserve is about 100 m (110 yd) west of Baring Road, part of the A2212 road, on this road Grove Park and Grove Park railway station are around 750 m (820 yd) to the south, then further Bromley at around 4 km (2.5 mi). Baring Road passes Westhorne Avenue part of the A205 or South Circular, after around 1 km (0.62 mi) northward, then Lee railway station after 1.5 km (0.93 mi) and Lee Green after 2.5 km (1.6 mi).

There are bus stops on either side of Baring Road near the entrance of Grove Park Nature Reserve that are served by London Buses routes, 261, on its journey from Lewisham to Locksbottom, via Lee and Bromley, 273 bus, which travels from Lewisham to Petts Wood, via Lee, Chislehurst and St Mary Cray, and the 284 bus route on its way from Lewisham to Grove Park Cemetery via Catford and Downham. Grove Park railway station to the south is served by these three buses plus routes 124, 126, 136, 181, and night bus N136, which take passengers to Bromley Common, Chinbrook, Mottingham, Eltham, Hither Green, Ladywell, Middle Park, New Cross, Peckham, Perry Vale, Plaistow, Bromley, Sundridge, and Sydenham.

Grove Park Nature Reserve and the footpath where the main entrance is located, Railway Children Walk are part of the South East London Green Chain, footpaths in a linked system of open spaces in southeast London, and the paths are also part of the Capital Ring.

== History ==
=== Before the nature reserve ===
In the mid eighteenth century the area that is now Grove Park Nature Reserve and the majority of the surrounding area was all agricultural fields, the buildings of Burnt Ash Farm were located to the north of the site. By the 1860s several other farm buildings were present, including Shrofield Farm, close by to the west, College Farm to the northeast, Claypit Farm to the east, and Grove Farm, which gave its name to Grove Park, to the southeast.

The South Eastern Main Line railway was built through Grove Park in 1865, connecting the existing Lewisham station to the newly built Chislehurst railway station. In 1868 the line was extended to join Tonbridge railway station, then in 1871 Grove Park railway station opened 750 m (820 yd) to the south of the site. In the late nineteenth century, and early twentieth century, what is now the southern end of the reserve, around the current entrance was a row of tennis courts. The land immediately north of here was within the garden of a large house on Baring Road from the late nineteenth century and became wooded early in the twentieth century, The remains of an old cast iron fence which was part of the boundary fence of the garden are still visible here.

Between 1894 and 1899, writer and poet, Edith Nesbit lived in a large house named Three Gables on Baring Road, where the residential apartment building Stratfield House now stands. Her garden backed up to the railway line and overlapped with what is now the southern part of the nature reserve, it is suggested that the location inspired her in writing the children's book The Railway Children which was published in 1906; the fictional house near the railway in the book is called Three Chimneys similar in name to Nesbit's real house near the railway in Grove Park. The footpath running along the southern side of Grove Park Nature Reserve, through where Nesbit's garden was previously located has been named Railway Children Walk, in memory of the book and author. For much of the mid-twentieth century, up to the 1980s, the strip of land along the east side of the railway line from St. Mildred's Road in the north, to Grove Park in the south, including what is now Grove Park Nature Reserve, was used mostly as allotments, and was of particular importance during the Dig For Victory campaign during the Second World War.

Near the centre of the reserve, within the circular path there is a small hollow which was previously a pond with a small island in the middle, which has long dried up, and also the former site of a World War II anti-aircraft battery.

=== As a nature reserve ===
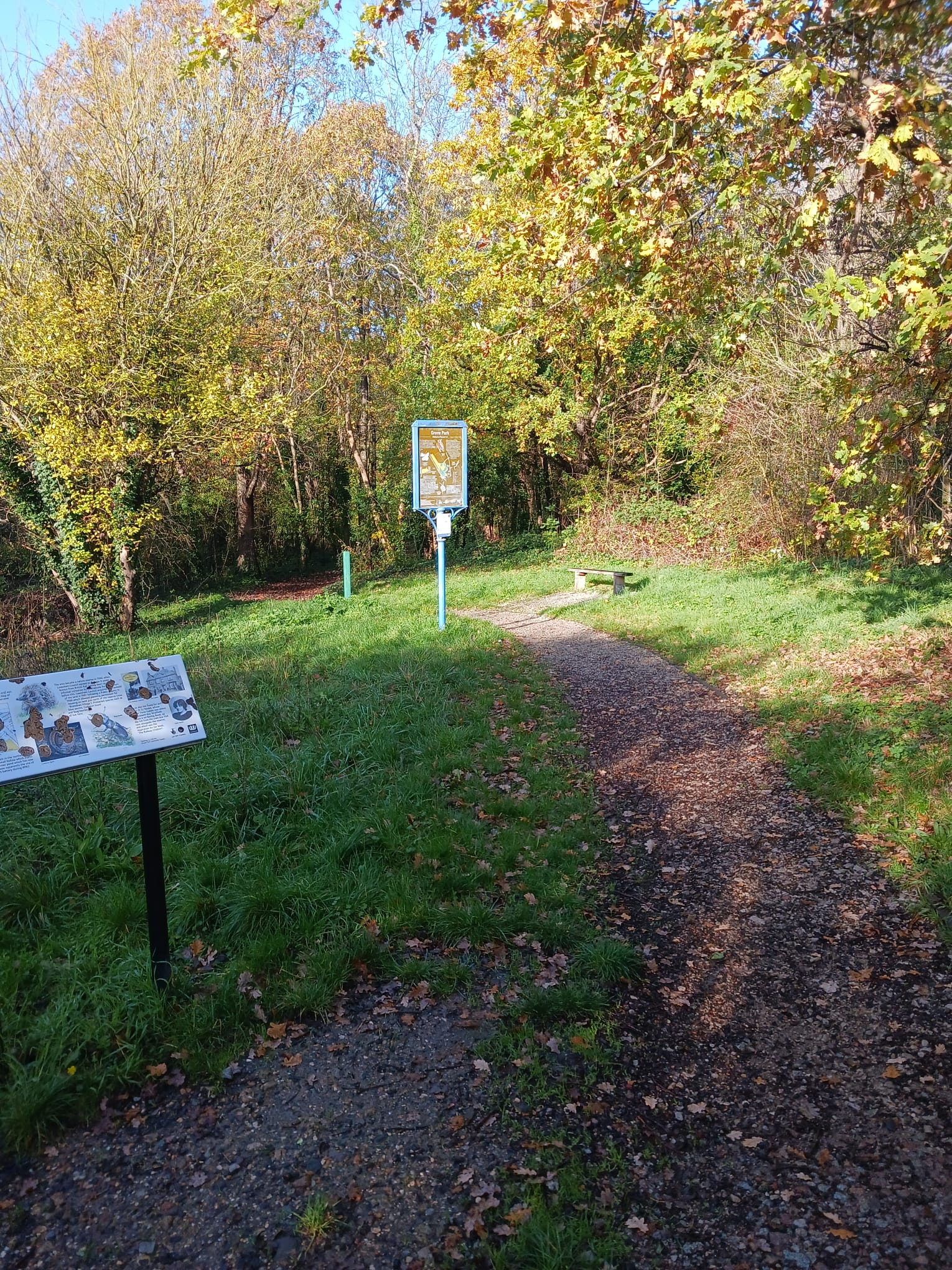
Since 2007, Lottery funding has help pay for installing new things in the nature reserve including signs

In 1984 the site became a nature reserve, then known as Hither Green Nature Reserve, when the Lewisham London Borough Council agreed to manage the area under licence from British Rail, although the site had been used informally by local residents for recreation for many years before this. In 1987 Lewisham Council acquired freehold of the land, following a public enquiry the previous year which allowed planning permission for housing on land just to the north, called Bramdean Village, new cul-de-sac roads named Gables Close and Oak Apple Court adjoining the existing road Bramdean Crescent. After Lewisham Council acquired the freehold they agreed the site should remain open access for the public. In the past the site had also been referred to as Hither Green Nature Reserve.

In 2007 the site's name was changed to its current name, Grove Park Nature Reserve. That year, an organisation named Friends of Grove Park Nature Reserve was set up, the National Lottery Community Fund has awarded the organisation funds on four occasions between 2007 and 2013, totalling £31,186, three of these funds were to improve Grove Park Nature Reserve directly. On 7 May 2007, £8,292 was awarded for altering the main entrance of site to increase accessibility, and in partnership with Lewisham Council and the Purple Broccoli Theatre, children were offered story telling and exploration of the park; hedge, and bulb planting with help from volunteers also took place. On 15 April 2009 £4,600 was given to hold an open day during the summer to attract local volunteers. Visitors built nest boxes for birds and bats, and helped pick litter and clean graffiti, guided walks were put on, and a treasure hunt for children. The same day, a local sculptor named Heather Burrell unveiled a peace pole sculpture, she had constructed on the grass embankment within the reserve, consisting of metal flowers, and the word Peace in several languages, carved into metal leaves. The sculpture was dedicated to South African Anglican bishop, Desmond Tutu, who lived in Grove Park in the 1970's and came back to visit in 2009; children from Baring Primary School choir sang at the sculpture unveiling. The Lottery Fund also gave £9,075 on 5 September 2013 to install signposting around the nature reserve to give visitors directions and information on local wildlife and history. The Nature Reserve has won the Green Flag Award several times from 2009. In 2011 Friends of Grove Park Nature Reserve with help from Stephen Kenny and an organisation called Awards for All set up an audio tour in Grove Park Nature Reserve. Five signs were installed at different points along the path within the reserve showing a local phone number visitors could call with their own mobile phone and they would be able to listen to a short recording up to nineteen seconds long corresponding to their location. It was planned to use QR codes at a later date and give people the option to purchase honey made by bees that are at the site.

In 2020 Grove Park Nature Reserve and Railway Children Walk were temporarily closed several times for a number of weeks in March, June, August and November so UK Power Networks could complete works including drilling, to maintain the electricity supply network. The work took longer to complete than anticipated due to ground conditions, and the COVID-19 pandemic, but was finally completed in November 2020 and the grassland and pathway that had been effected was returned to its previous state.

In September 2020, it was reported that one of the entry points to Railway Children Walk and Grove Park Nature Reserve was unlawfully closed and locked. It was reported that after Lewisham Council locked the gate temporarily due to the COVID-19 pandemic, Stuart Oldroyd who was working 3242 Investments Ltd/Tilco, had locked the gate, to the private land behind the Ringway Community Centre with his own chain, blocking the route members of the public, including school children used to access the reserve, even though they had been told previously they had permission to use the land for access. Permission to build a trailer park on the land had been applied for but was refused in August 2020. The planning officers of Lewisham Council had issue with the proposal to erect larger buildings on the land and the plans to cut down a number of trees, as it would result in an urbanising visual impact and cause harm to the land, and would have a detrimental impact on the character and appearance of the site. Councillor Liam Curran, chair of Lewisham Council's sustainable development select committee, was reported as saying blocking the access route was "unlawful" and "shocking". Some of the trees were reported to have been ringbarked around this time, which normally kills the tree, even though permission to remove any trees was denied.

Following several meetings earlier that year, on 16 September 2020 Grove Park Nature Reserve was officially designated as a Local nature reserve. Making it the second site in Grove Park to be designated as such, along with Burnt Ash Pond, 650 m (710 yd) to the northeast. The declaration stated that Grove Park Nature Reserve is considered a Borough Grade I Site of Importance for Nature Conservation and also recognised the site’s value as Metropolitan Open Land, and being part of the South East London Green Chain Walk and the regional Capital Ring...The site first became a reserve in 1984 when the Council agreed to manage it under licence from British Rail, however it had been used for informal recreation by local people for many years before this. The Council acquired the freehold of the land in 1987 following a Public Inquiry in 1986 which allowed planning permission for housing on land just to the north of the reserve.

Management of the site currently spend £3,500 a year maintaining the reserve, including tasks such as cutting 75% of the grass twice a year, trimming around half of the bushes and brambles and a small amount of coppicing trees, to keep the grassland and paths open and prevent them being overgrown.

=== Future proposals ===
There are proposals for future development of Grove Park Nature Reserve and surrounding green space. A group named Friends of Hope are planning to improve the area around the path near the secondary entrance from Hoser Avenue in the future. Grove Park Neighbourhood Forum has plans for the 7.2 ha (18 acres) of open land, stretching 4.5 km (2.8 mi), from the South Circular in the north, to past Elmstead Woods railway station in the south, including the nature reserve, to be turned into a new larger park. The land covered in the proposal is under ownership of several different organisations including the London Borough of Lewisham, and covers, in addition to Grove Park Nature Reserve, Northbrook Park, Hither Green Cemetery, Railway Children Forest Garden, Chinbrook Meadows, Grove Park Cemetery, Sundridge Park Golf Course, Elmstead Woods and several other open areas of woodland, meadow, wetland and allotments, and includes some of the River Quaggy's course. Planned development to Grove Park Nature Reserve includes increasing the number of paths that access the site from the outside, and constructing a lookout tower overlooking the railway line. The proposal was submitted to Lewisham Council in 2019, although the southern area is covered by the London Borough of Bromley, and it may stop any new developments being built on the area. The aims of the proposal are to protect biodiversity of threatened species in the area, as the land is thought to be the only remaining urban site remaining that offers habitat to five species of hairstreak butterflies, and to provide opportunities for outdoor learning, recreation and well-being. The new proposed park, which would follow the railway line, has been described as an urban park, district park, or urban national park, and referred to as Grove Park Urban National Park, The Railway Children District Park and Railway Children Urban National Park, taking the name from the Edith Nesbit novel, said to have been inspired by the location.

== Gallery ==
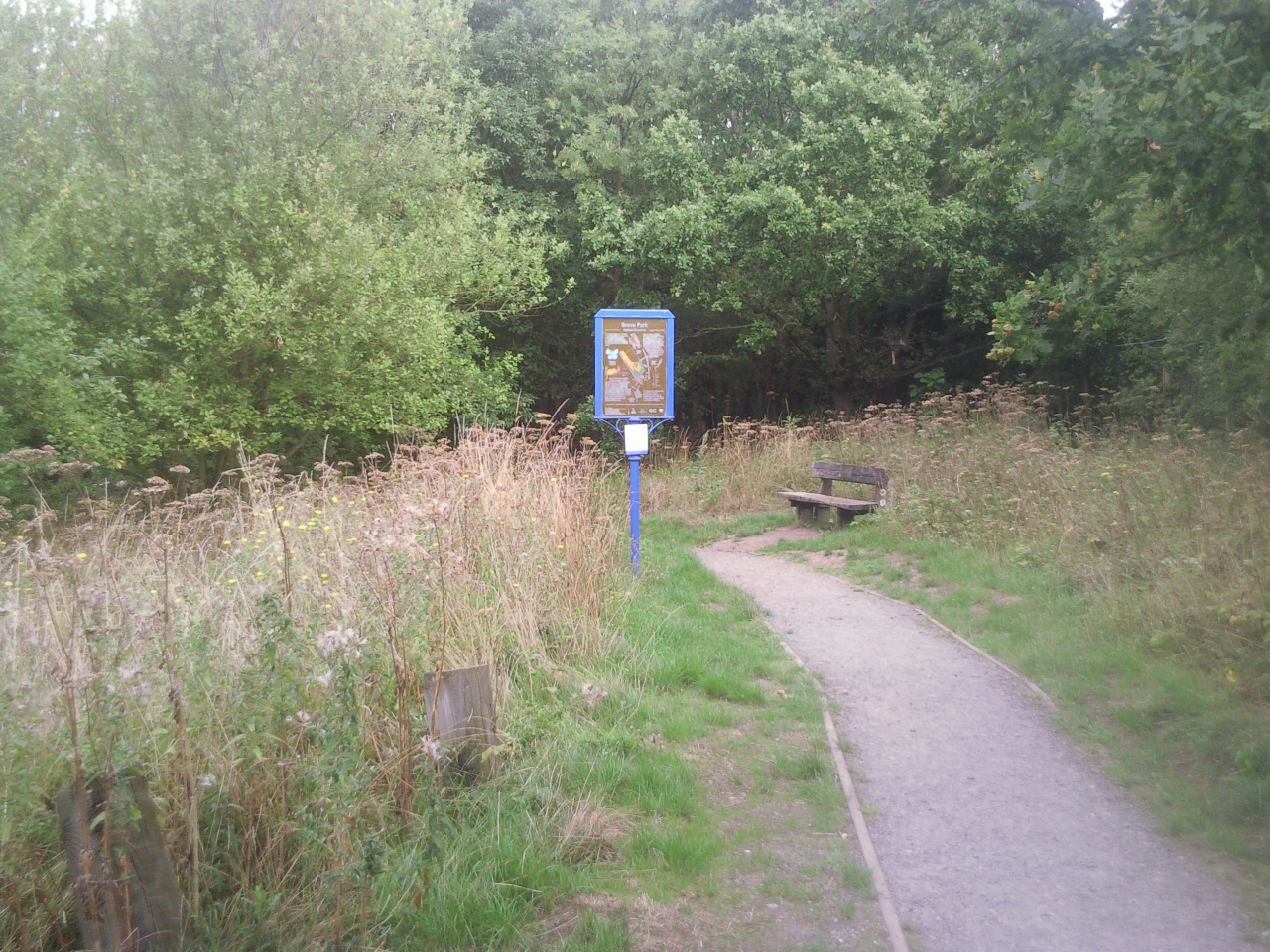

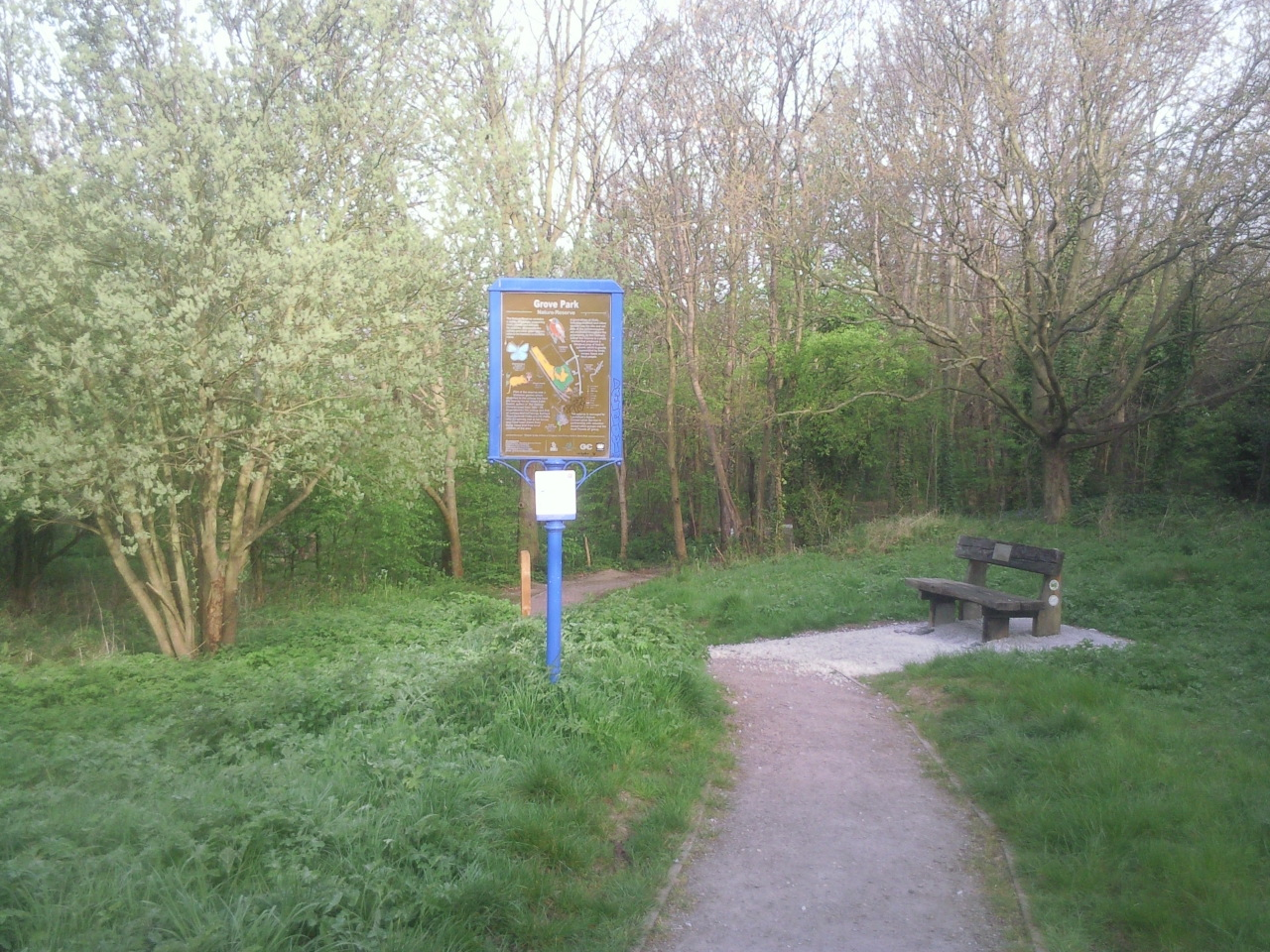

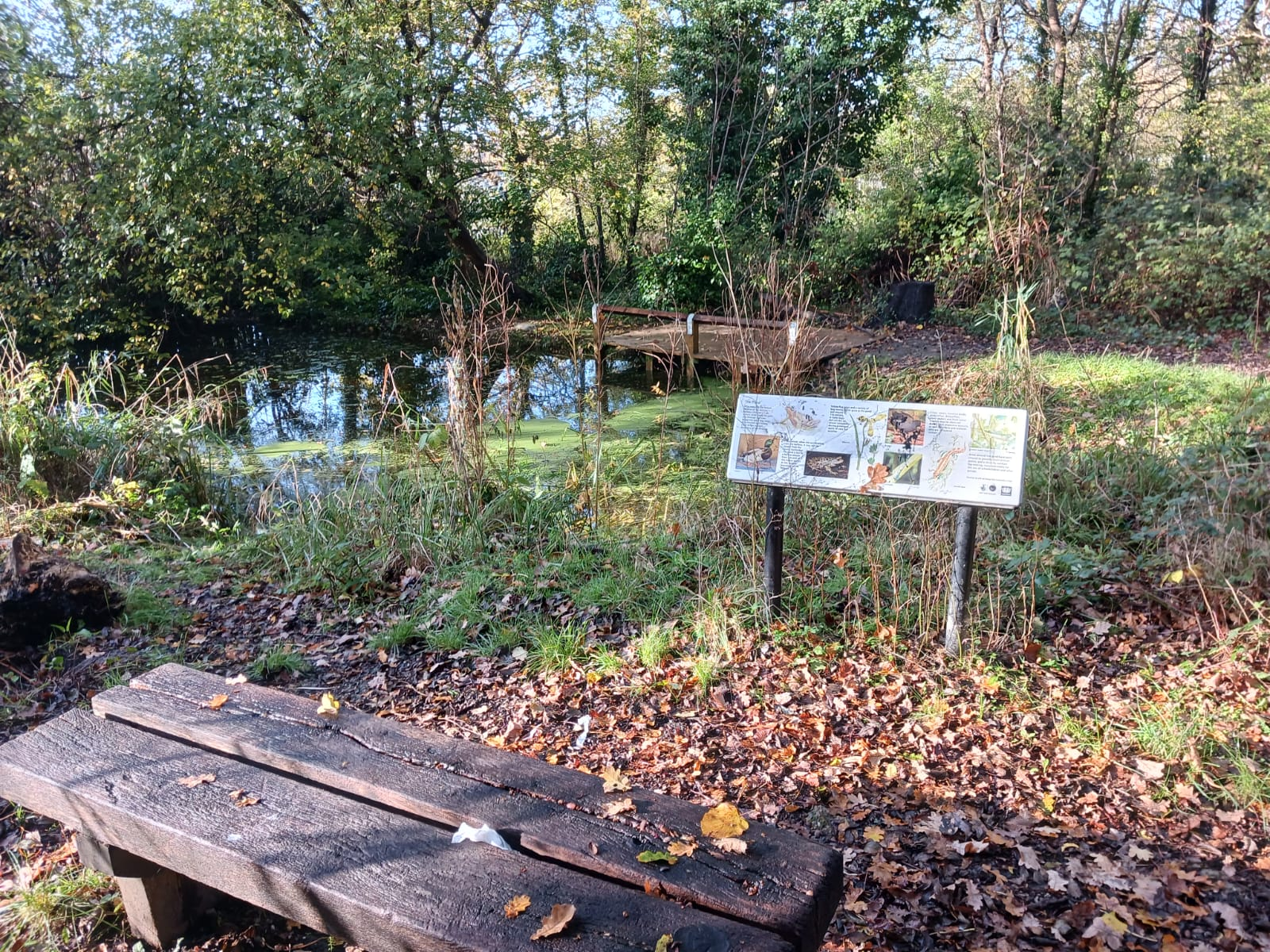

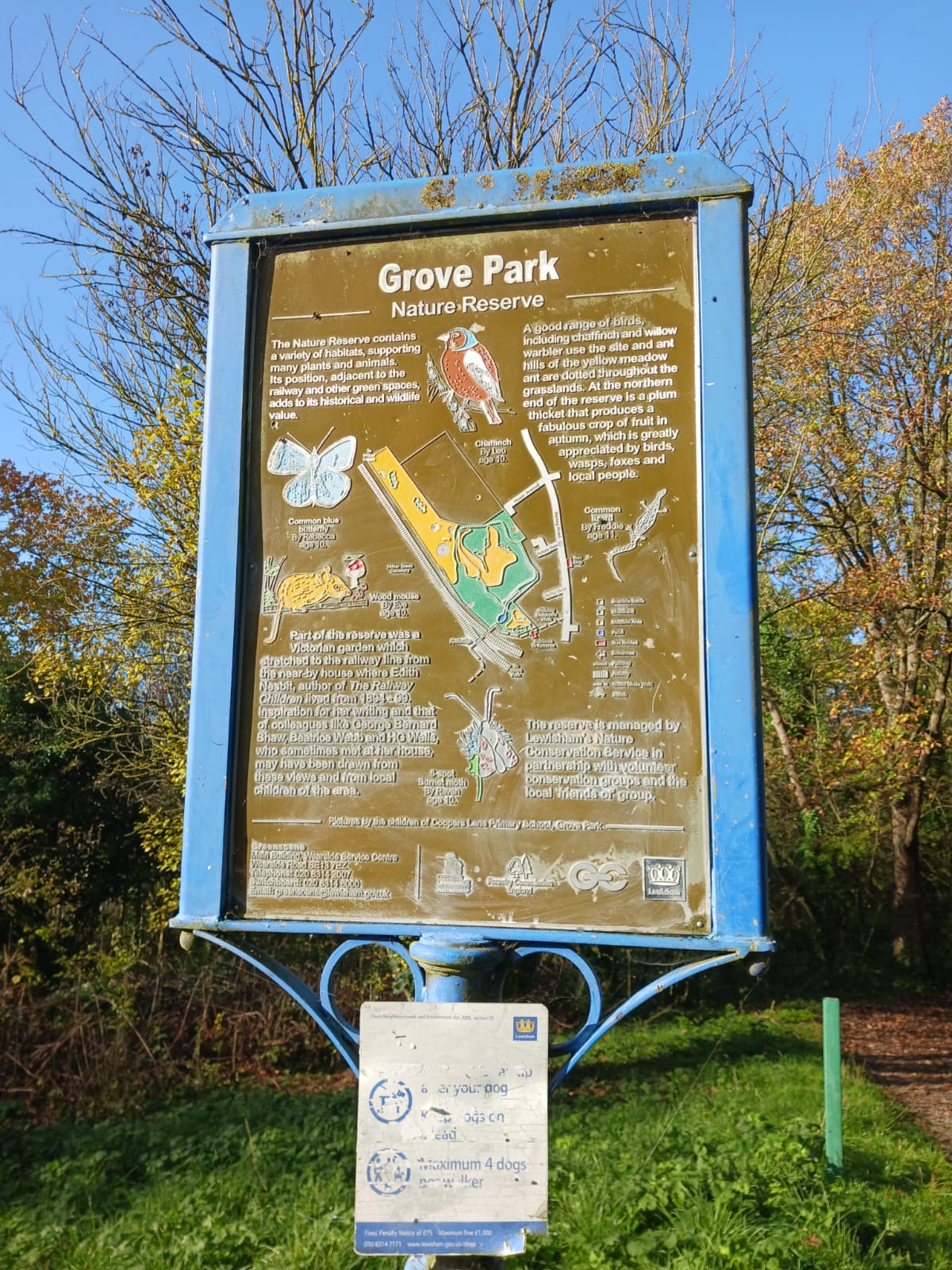

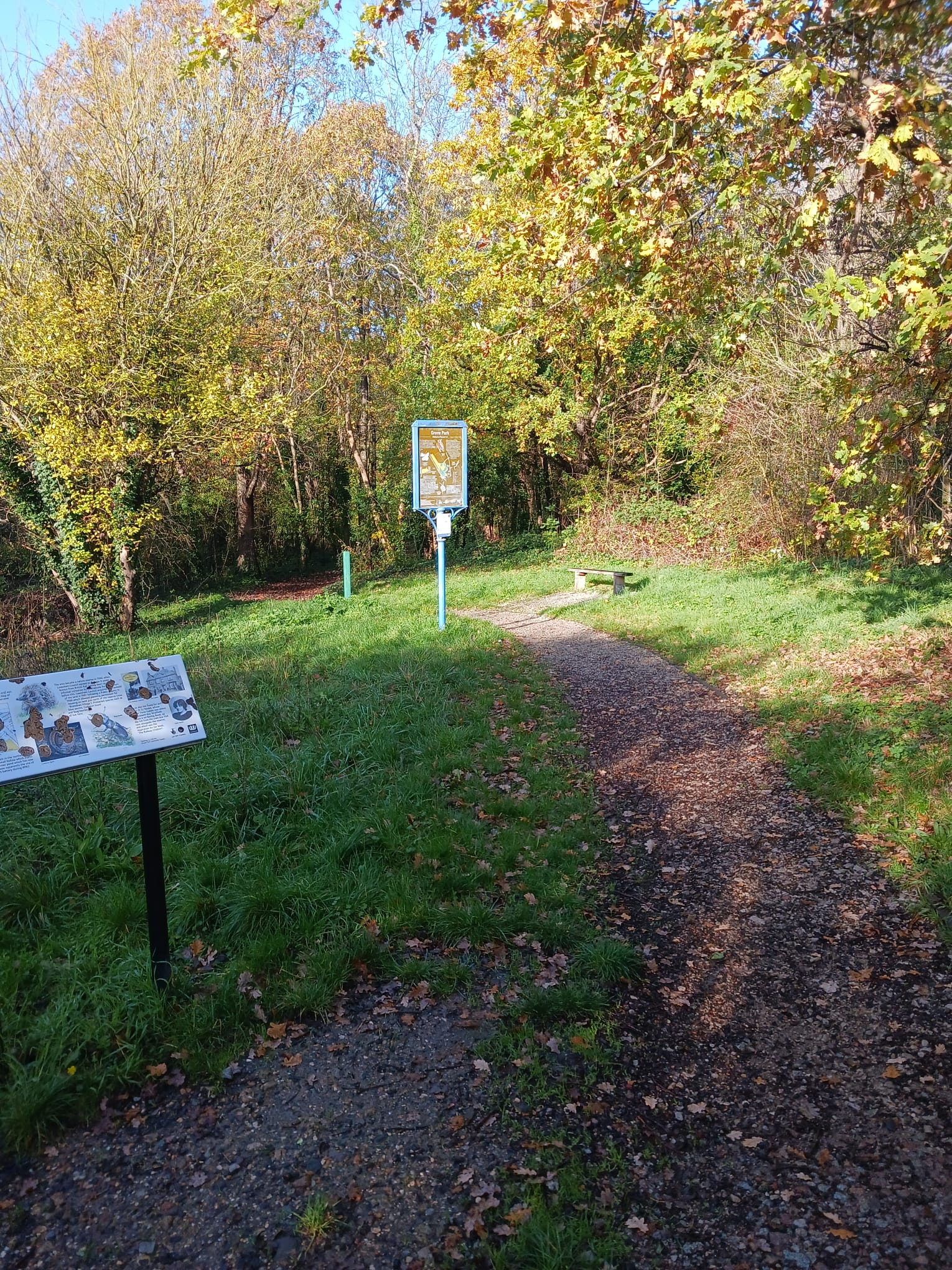

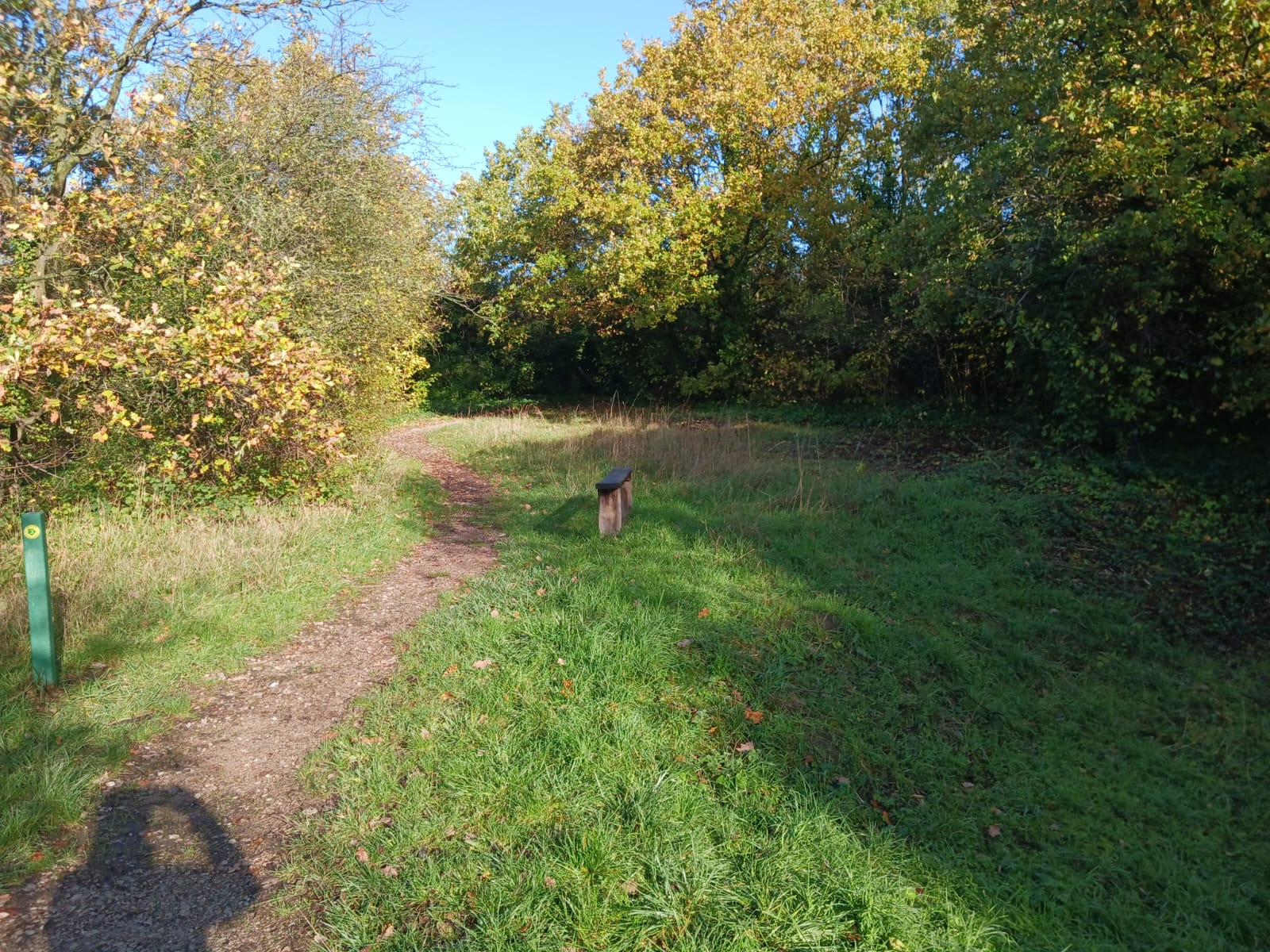

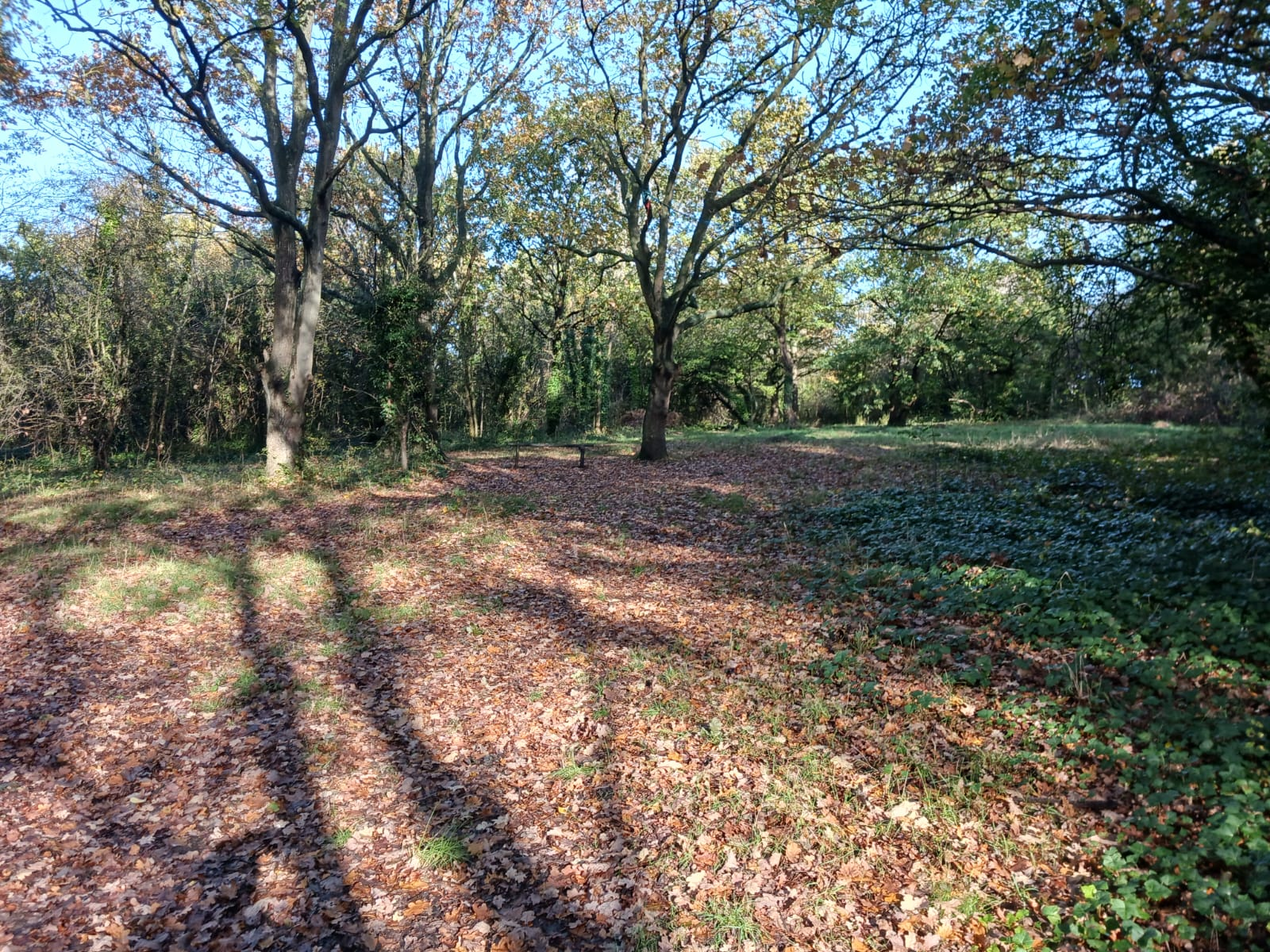

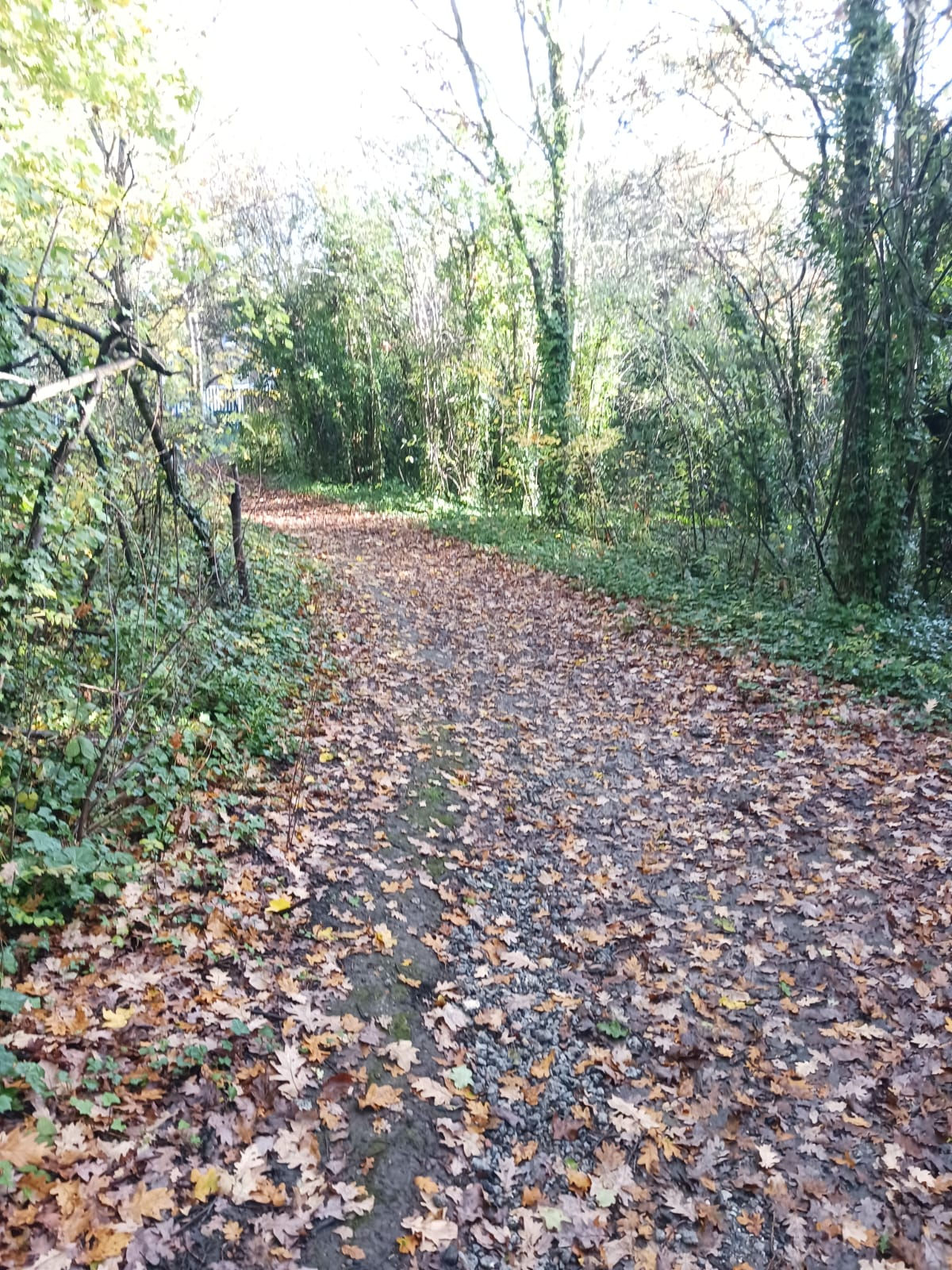

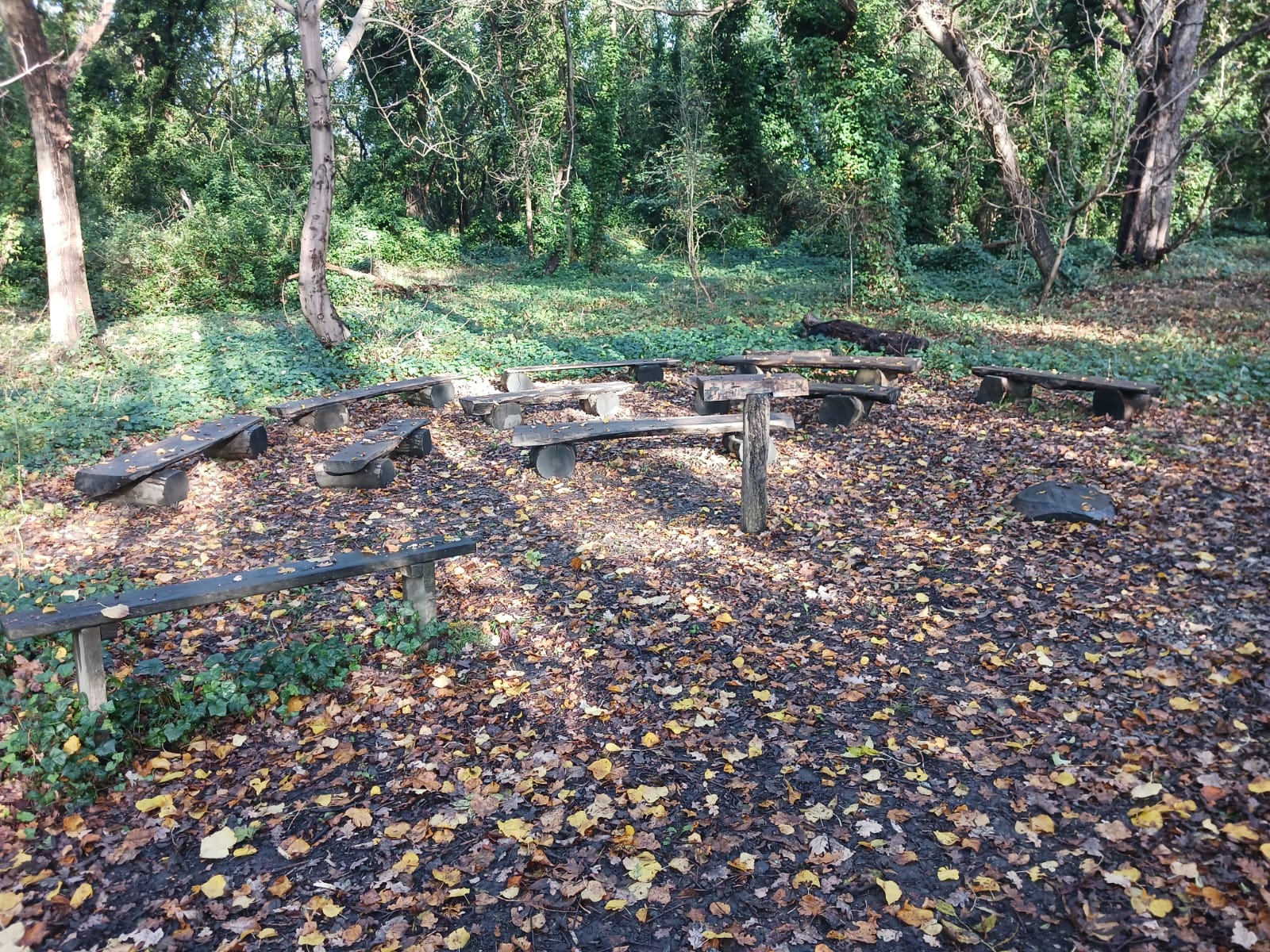

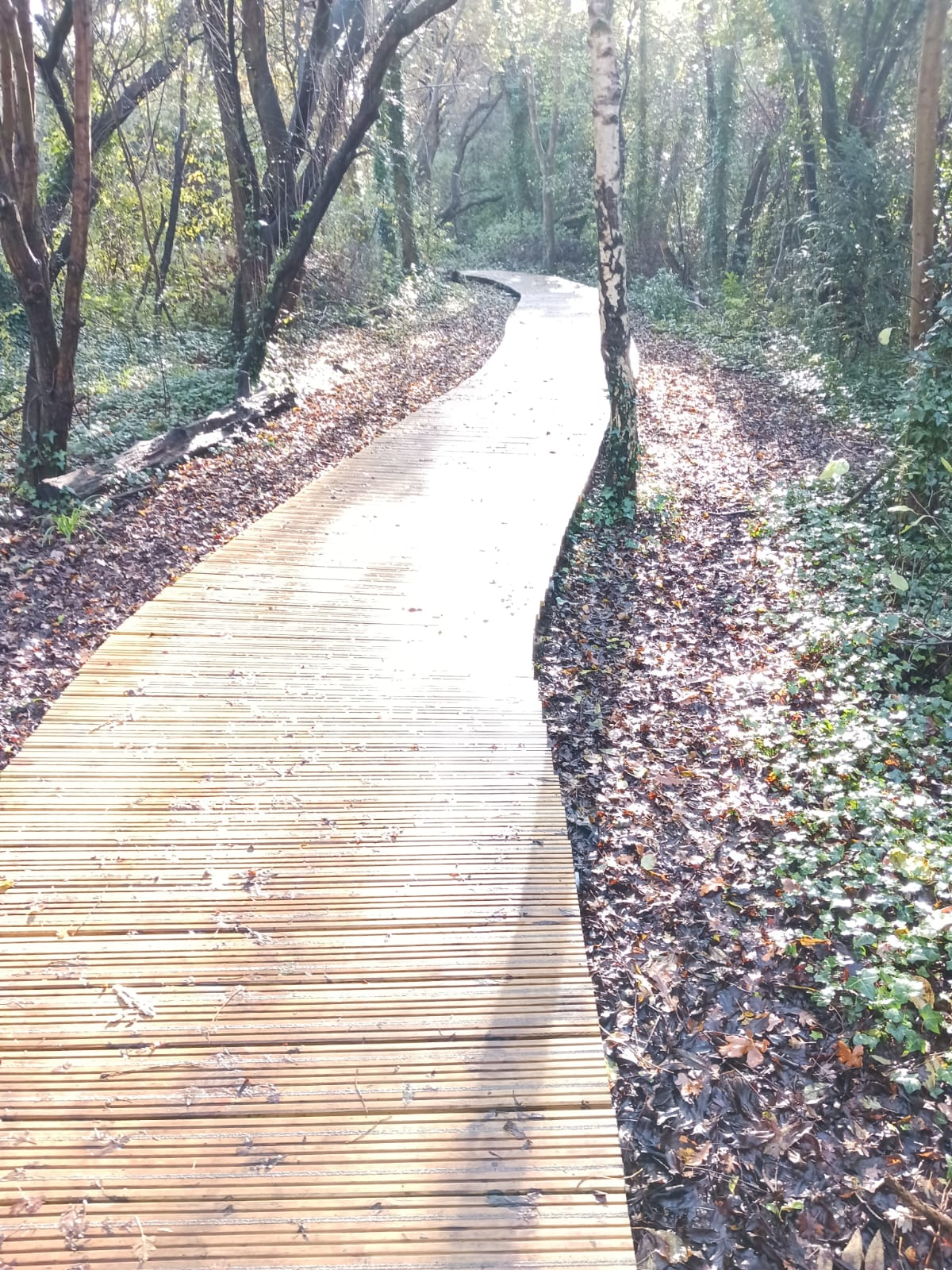

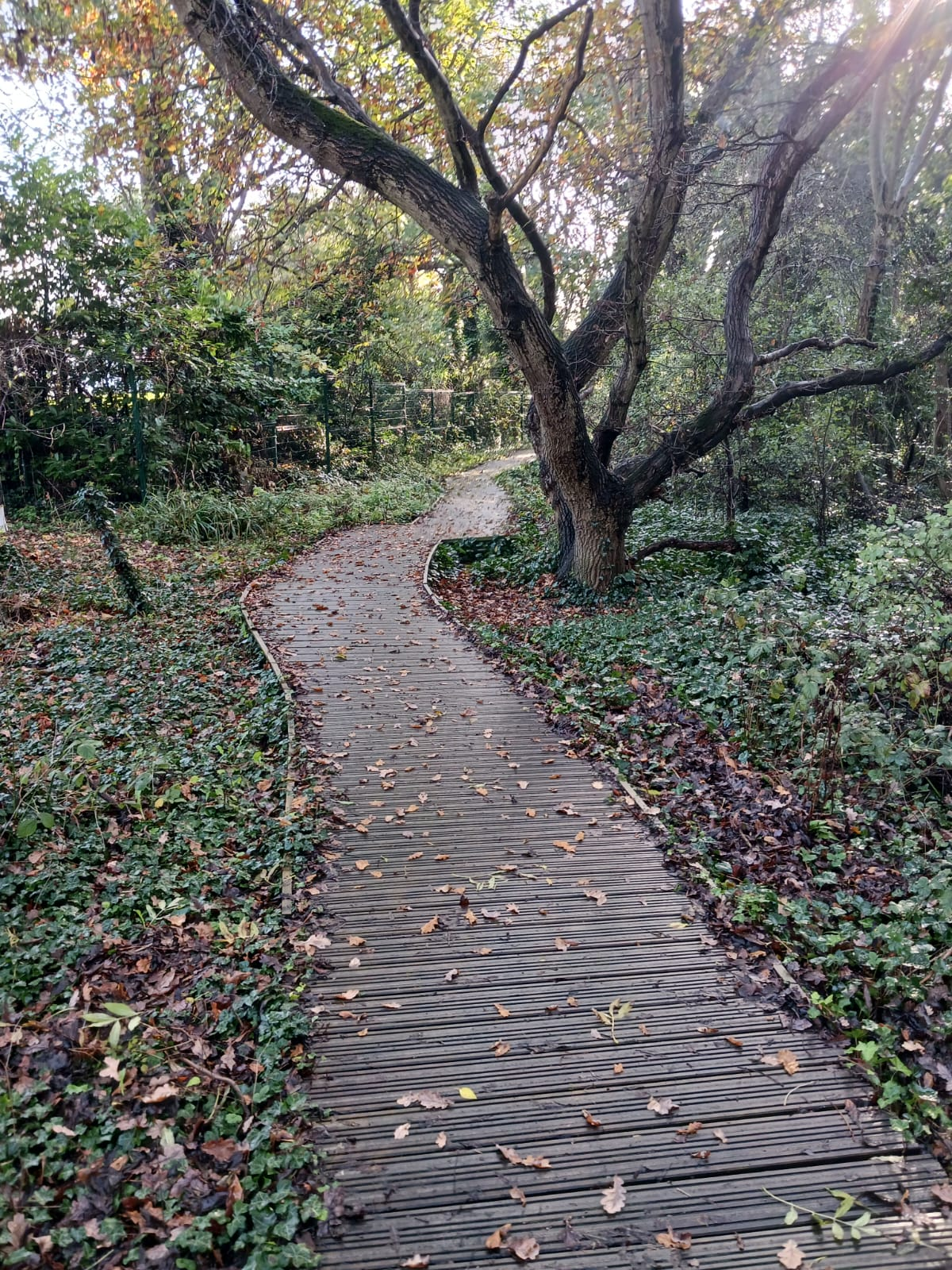

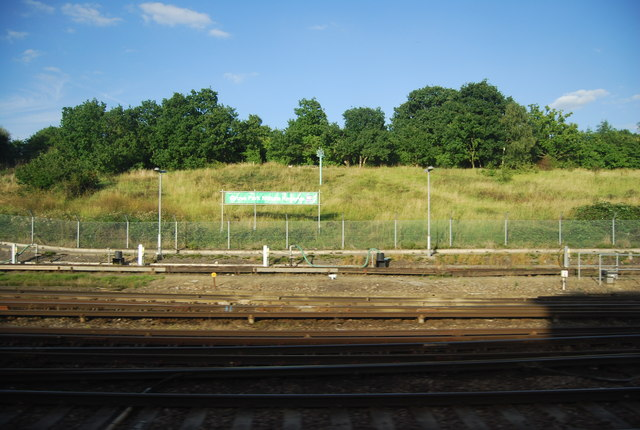
