= Hither Green Cemetery =

Burial ground in southeast London, England

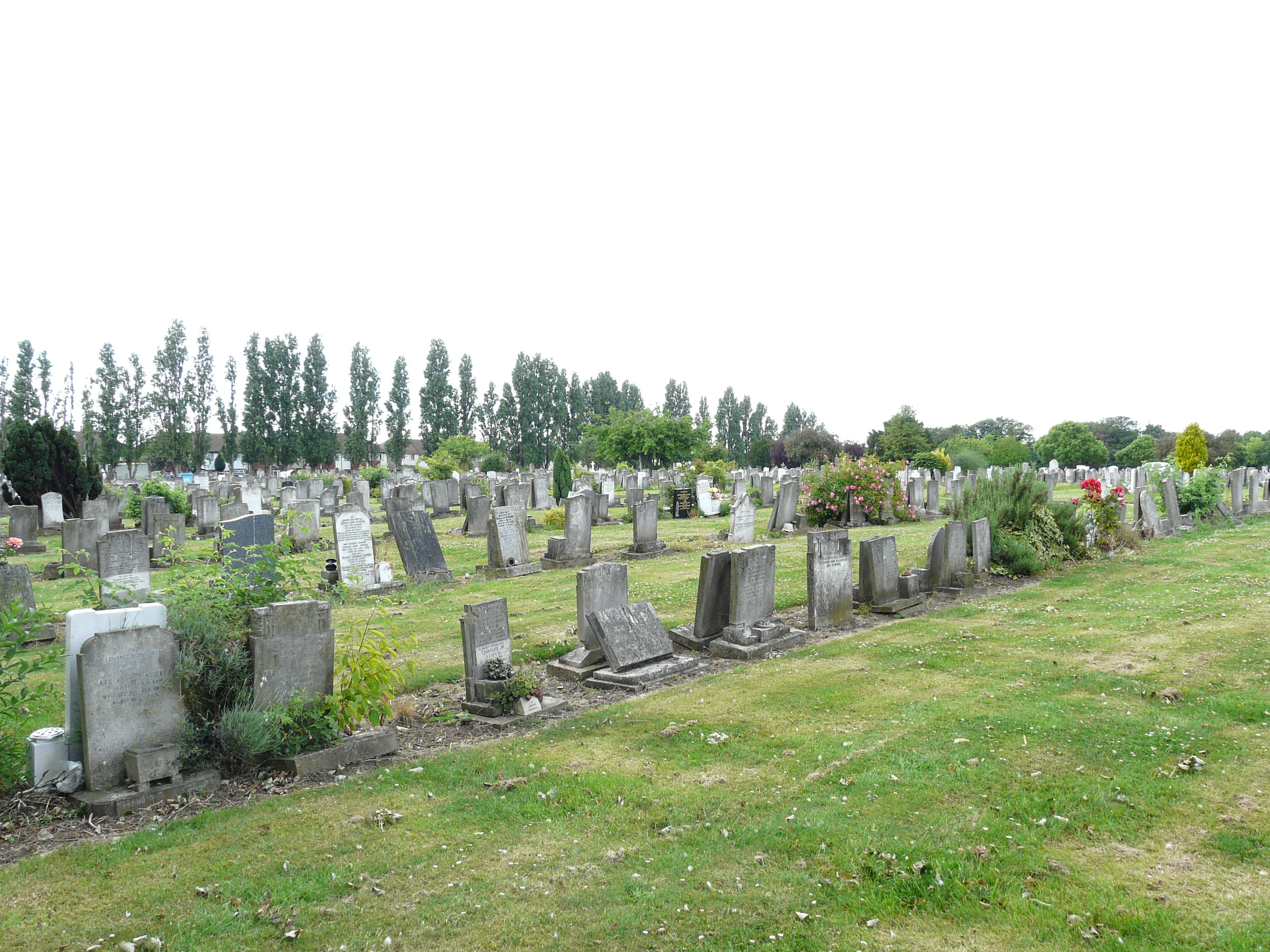
- Hither Green Cemetery
- Interactive map of Hither Green Cemetery

Details
- Established: 1873
- Location: Verdant Lane, Grove Park, Lewisham, southeast London
- Country: England
- Coordinates: 51°26′11″N 0°0′39″E
- Owned by: Lewisham Council
- Size: 15 hectares (37 acres)
- Find a Grave: Hither Green Cemetery

Hither Green Cemetery, opened as Lee Cemetery in 1873, is a large cemetery located on the east side of Verdant Lane in southeast London, England. The cemetery is situated between Catford, Hither Green, Downham, Grove Park and Lee, west of the railway line connecting Grove Park and Hither Green stations, and close to Grove Park Sidings and Grove Park Nature Reserve. Next to the cemetery is Lewisham Crematorium, which opened in 1956.

== History ==
When the cemetery opened in 1873, it was named Lee Cemetery, although Lee's church and centre are about 1.5 miles (2.5 km) north of the cemetery; the land was part of the Lee civil parish at the time. The original cemetery occupied what is now the northernmost part of the cemetery, located on a road named Hither Green Lane, later renamed Verdant Lane. The cemetery later expanded southward into lands previously occupied by the fields of Shroefield Farm.

The cemetery was designed by Francis Freeman Thorne (buried in the cemetery) and included two Gothic chapels built by William Webster – one Anglican, one for dissenters (the Dissenters' Chapel was for people belonging to nonconformist, i.e.: non-Anglican, churches) – and ornamental entrance gates. The original gate lodge was demolished in the 1960s. Opened in 1956, Lewisham Crematorium was designed by Lewisham borough architect, M. H. Forward.

The Dissenters' Chapel was recorded as boarded up and fenced off in 2016 and 2020. In 2019, the Anglican Chapel was closed during the COVID-19 pandemic, and Lewisham Council subsequently refurbished the building, installing modern audio-visual equipment and environmentally-friendly building systems. It was officially reopened for funerals, memorials, weddings and other events in September 2025.

== Notable graves and memorials ==
=== 1939–1945 War Memorial ===
In the cemetery, there is a memorial to all those who died at their post during World War II, erected in 1951. This is situated next to the Sandhurst Road School memorial.

=== Military war graves ===
The cemetery contains the graves of 39 Commonwealth service personnel of World War I and 198 from World War II. Those whose graves could not be marked by CWGC headstones are listed on the Screen Wall memorial in the main War Graves plot.

=== Civilian war graves ===
- There is a large terraced area which was built as a memorial to the 38 children and six teachers who died when Sandhurst Road School was bombed on Wednesday 20 January 1943.
- Next to the bombing memorial is a grave of 31 of the children and one teacher whose families chose to bury their dead together.

=== Other graves ===
- Seraphino Antao (1937–2011) – Kenyan athlete
- Errol Christie (1963–2017) – English professional boxer and boxing trainer
- William Colbeck (1871–1930) – mariner who made two journeys to Antarctica
- Maxwell Confait (1945–1972) – murdered in Catford in 1972
- Leland Lewis Duncan (1862–1923) – English public servant, antiquary and author
- Edward Owen Greening (1836–1923) – British co-operative and radical activist
- Montague Holbein (1861–1944) – British champion cyclist and swimmer
- Mike Jeffery (1933–1973) – music business manager (Note: Guilfoyle notes "as a strange aftermath to his burial, at his father’s request, his body was exhumed from the cemetery in 1981 by Home Office license. His remains were later cremated at Hither Green Crematorium without ceremony!")
- Melton Prior (1845–1910) – English artist and war correspondent for The Illustrated London News (plus his wife, Alabaster, killed by a tram in Lewisham in 1907)
- Joseph Bryant Rotherham (1828–1910) – English biblical scholar
- David Thompson Seymour (1831–1916) – soldier and the inaugural commissioner of the Queensland Police Service

Jane Cannon Cox (d.1917), a suspect in the 1876 poisoning of lawyer Charles Bravo in Balham, is buried in the cemetery.

==== Cremations ====
Notable people cremated at Lewisham Crematorium include Polish Submariner Borys Karnicki (1985), medium Doris Stokes (1987), opera singer Lina Prokofiev (1989), and comedian Malcolm Hardee (2005).

== Gallery ==
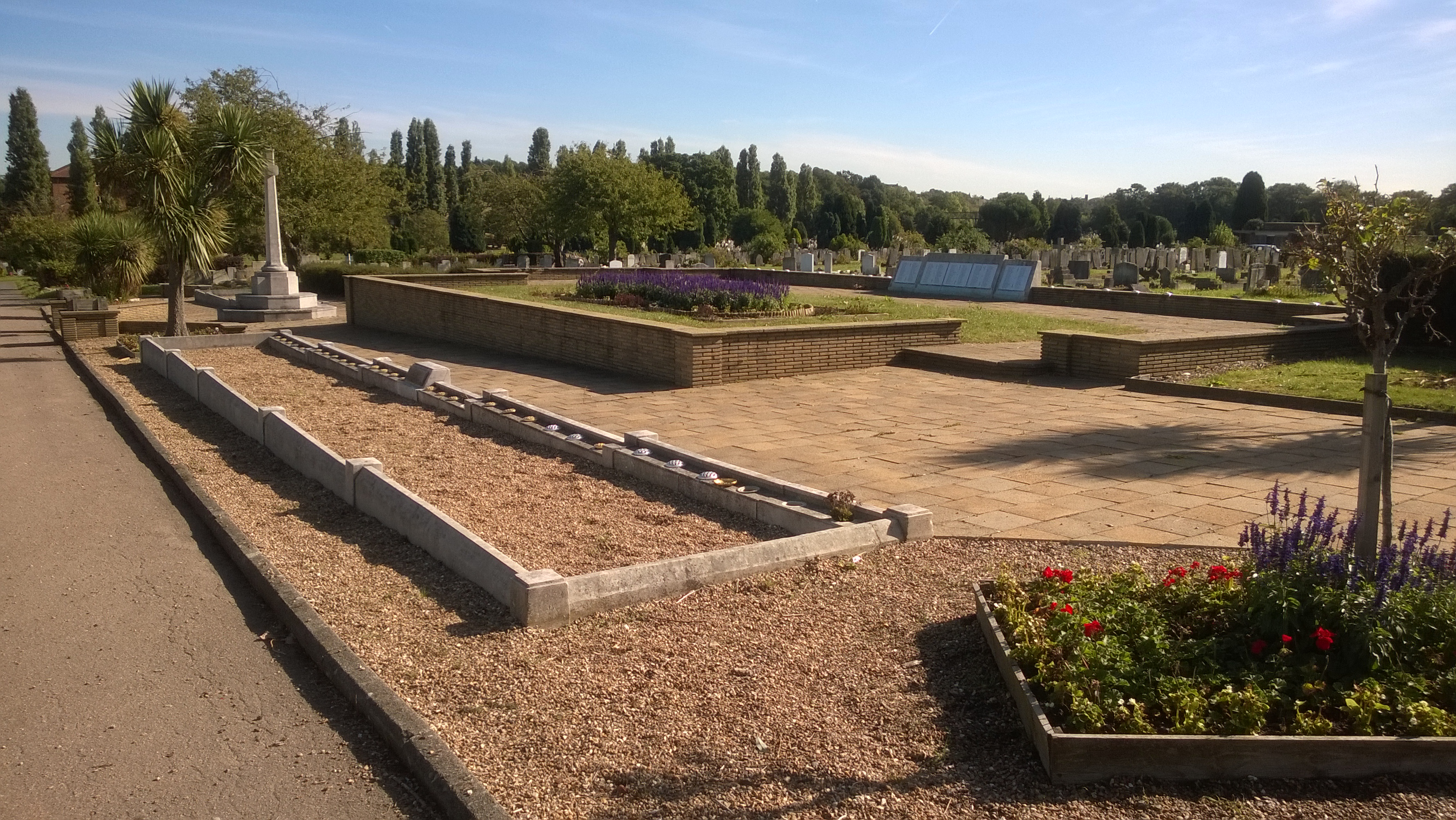
Memorials to the victims of the Second World War and of the bombing of Sandhurst Road School, Catford.

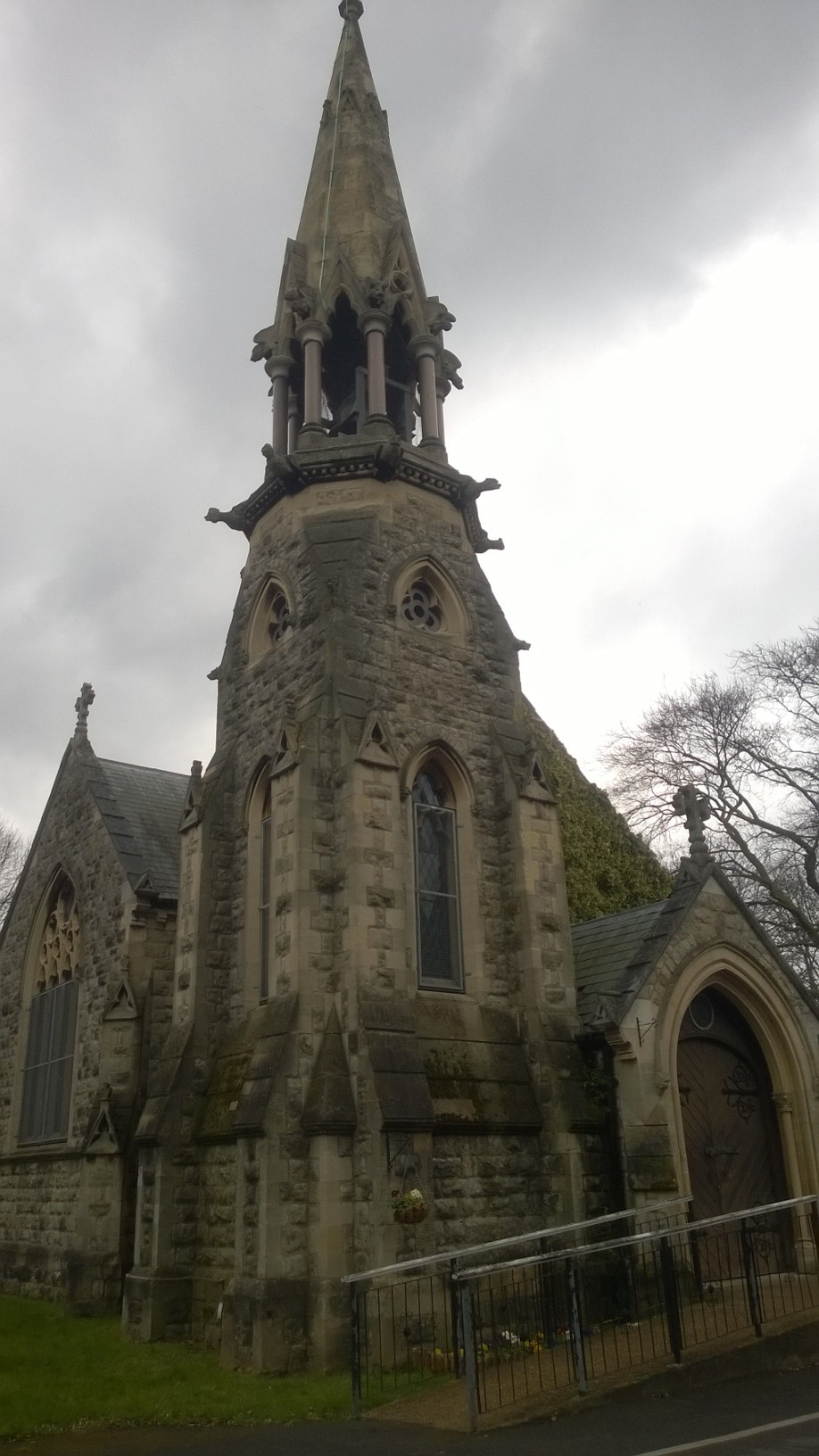
The Anglican Chapel in Hither Green Cemetery, south east London.

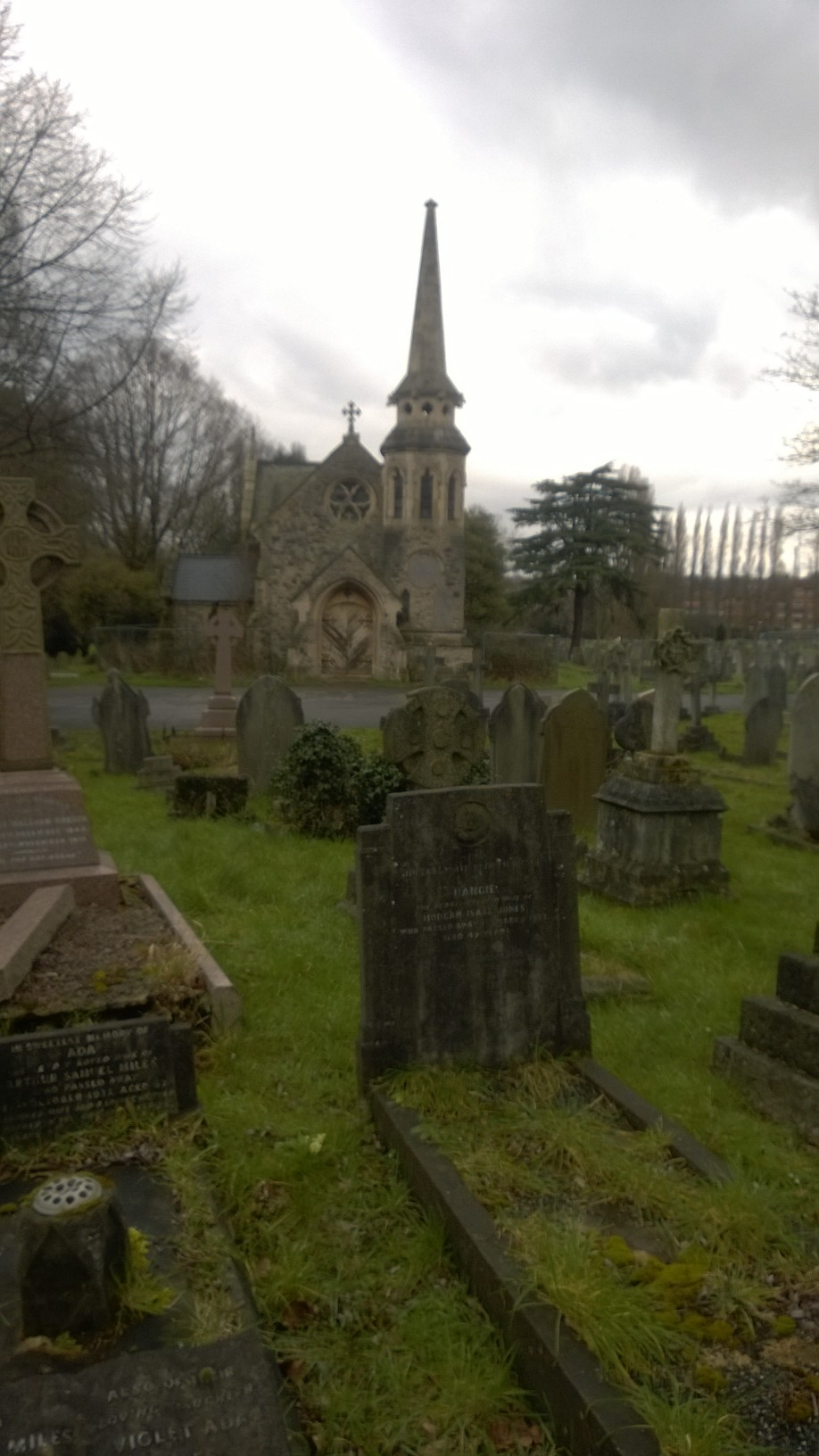
The abandoned and disused Dissenters' Chapel in Hither Green Cemetery, south east London.

== Transport links ==
=== Bus ===
Hither Green Cemetery and Lewisham Crematorium is best served by the 284 bus route serving Grove Park, Lewisham, Ladywell, Catford station and Catford Bridge station.

They are also served by the London Buses route 124 bus route from Eltham, Middle Park and Downham or Catford.

=== Train ===
The cemetery and crematorium is within walking distance of Hither Green station and Grove Park station.
