= Northbrook Park, London =

Park in London, England

Northbrook Park
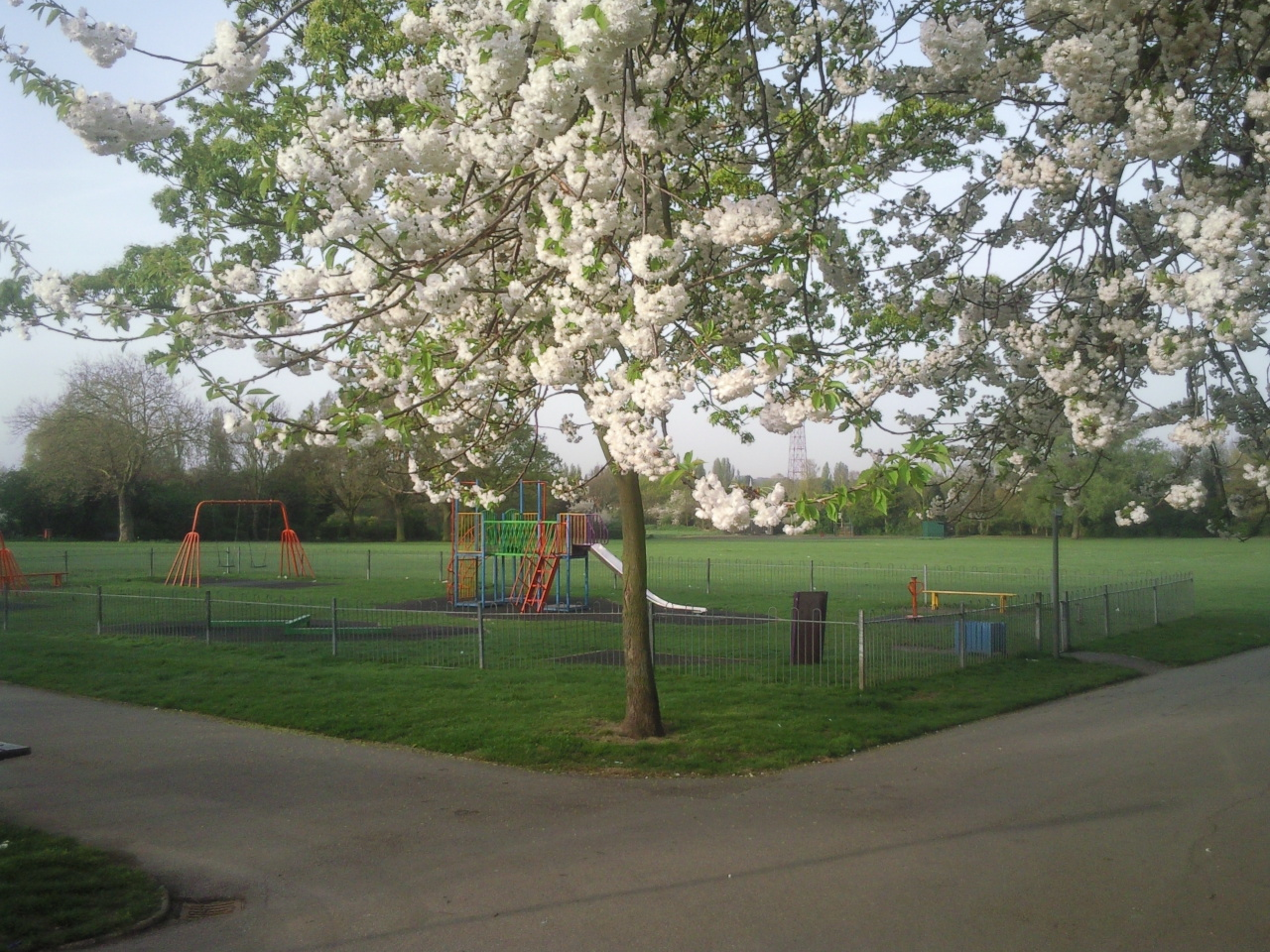
- Northbrook Park, April 2011, looking southwest

- Location within London Borough of Lewisham
- Type: Public park
- Location: Grove Park/Lee, London Borough of Lewisham, England
- Coordinates: 51.442°N 0.014°E
- Area: 9 acres (3.6 ha)
- Created: 1898 (gifted to public), 1903 (opened)
- Owner: London Borough of Lewisham
- Operator: Glendale Grounds Management
- Open: 8am - dusk
- Status: Open year round
- Awards: Green Flag Award; 2017, 2020, 2021
- Public transit: Lee railway station, Buses 261, 160, 273, 202, 660
- Website: lewisham.gov.uk/inmyarea/openspaces/parks/northbrook-park

Northbrook Park is a public park located on Baring Road south of Lee Green and north of Grove Park in the London Borough of Lewisham, southeast London, England. It is roughly 9 acres (3.6 ha) in size, and contains a large central field bounded by trees, a children's playground, with a sandpit and splash pool, a multipurpose game court, two football pitches, and outdoor gym equipment. The park was previously a field named Ten-Acre Field, despite actually being 7 acres (2.8 ha), and part of the Baring Estate of Lee. In 1898, Thomas Baring, 1st Earl of Northbrook gifted part of his family's estate to public use in commemoration of the Diamond Jubilee of Queen Victoria. The Park was designed by Lt Col J J Sexby, Chief Officer of the London County Council's Parks Department, then was officially opened on 14 March 1903. In the past the park contained a larger playground, a paddling pool, a "legal" graffiti wall, a pond, a bowling green and a tennis court.

== Description ==
Northbrook Park is a public park in Grove Park, currently managed by Glendale Grounds Management for the London Borough of Lewisham. It is one of Lewisham's open spaces, and is open all year from 08:00 every morning, and closes near dusk, with times ranging from 16:00 to 21:00 in the evening, depending on time of year. The park is roughly 9 acres (3.6 ha) in size, approximately 220 m (241 yd) wide east to west and around 260 m (284 yd) long north to south. A large central field, around 4.5 acres (1.8 ha) in size takes up roughly half the park's total area, and is around 125 m (137 yd) north to south, 190 m (208 yd) east to west and is flat ground with short grass and very few trees. There is a straight concrete path joining the two gated entrances on Baring Road, and a long circular concrete path that surrounds the large central field. A short metal fence built to keep dogs out, follows the path and surrounds the central field, which contains a football pitch, a second smaller junior football pitch, and outdoor gym equipment. An old stone sundial erected in May 1903, with engraving describing the gift of the land by Lord Northbrook to commemorate Queen Victoria's Jubilee, stands at the front of the park off the straight path, but it is in disrepair. There is a small fenced playground with slides, swings, a zip line, a splash pool, a sandpit a roundabout and climbing frames in the northeast corner just inside the circular path, it was constructed around 2000, and improved in 2012. There is a thin strip of woodland surrounding the central field, including oak trees, mostly outside of the path, with fewer trees inside the path. The northwest corner is more overgrown and contains scrubland set aside as a wildlife area, this is the site of the original children's playground. South of the main field is an old bowling green, that is now used as a dog exercise area. South of this is a triangular piece of overgrown wooded ground with dirt paths cutting through it, this area used to be allotments and was not part of the original park grounds, it is now set aside as a forest school area. Just off the southwest corner of the central field there is a fenced multipurpose concrete game court, where a pond was previously sited.

== Location ==
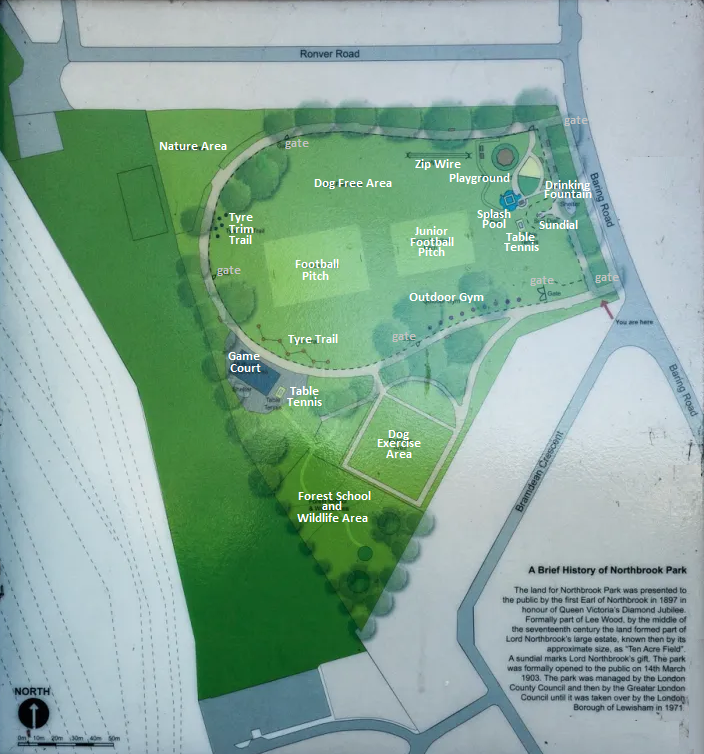
Map of Northbrook Park on the sign at the front of the park, August 2021, with added labels

Northbrook Park is located between Grove Park and Lee Green in the London Borough of Lewisham in southeast London, England, and is around 12 km (7.5 mi) southeast of Charing Cross. The park lies on the west side of Baring Road, part of the A2212 road, and has the postcode SE12 0JS. Just north of the park entrance on Baring Road there is a parade of shops on either side of the road, including a pub, several cafés, restaurants and take-aways, newsagents and off licence shops among others, and also a church and primary school. Northbrook Park is around 1.2 km (0.75 mi) north of Grove Park centre, 1 km (0.62 mi) southwest of Horn Park, 1.7 km (1.1 mi) south of Lee Green, and 1.5 km (0.93 mi) southeast from Hither Green. The park is separated from Grove Park Nature Reserve to the south by 200 m (220 yd) wide area of residential cul-de-sac streets that were constructed in the 1980s.

=== Boundaries ===
On the east side of the park iron railings with two entrance gates join the park to Baring Road. The northern side has a wooden fence separating the park from the back gardens of houses on Ronver Road, and the southeast border is a wooden fence backing on to the back alley of Bramdean Crescent. The western metal fence separates Northbrook Park from a small patch of woodland, which has the South Eastern Main Line railway and Grove Park Sidings on the other side. A closed equestrian facility which was named Pink Willow Equestrian Centre was next to the park's northwest corner, behind a wooden fence.

=== Transport ===
Northbrook Park is located on Baring Road, part of the A2212 road, Westhorne Avenue and St. Mildred's Road, part of the South Circular or A205 road are within 0.5 km (0.31 mi) of the park to the north. The 261 bus serves the bus stops along Baring Road near the park entrance, on its route from Lewisham to Bromley or Locksbottom. London Buses 160, 202, 273, and 660 serve roads within 0.5 km (0.31 mi) including the South Circular Road. The Nearest railway stations are Lee 1 km (0.62 mi) to the north, Grove Park 1.5 km (0.93 mi) to the southeast and Hither Green 1.5 km (0.93 mi) to the northwest.

== History ==
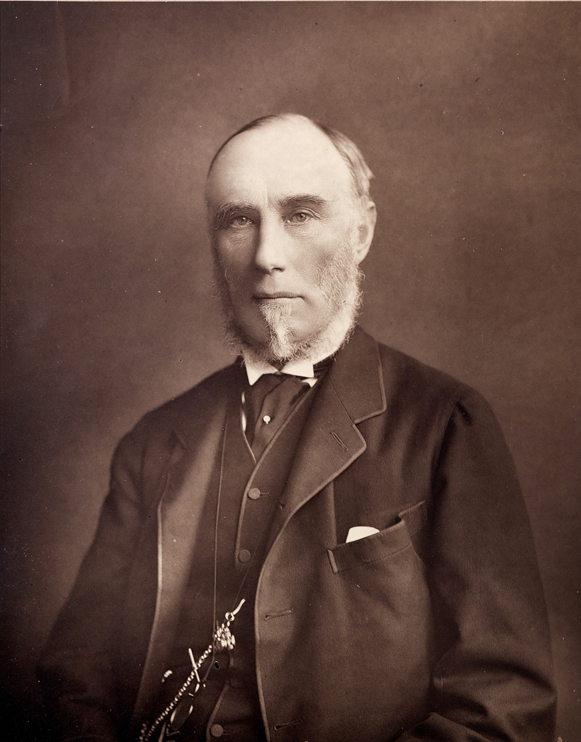
Thomas Baring, 1st Earl of Northbrook, gifted Ten-Acre Field to public use in 1898, to commemorate the Diamond Jubilee of Queen Victoria. Northbrook Park was completed and opened to the public 5 years later in 1903

Before it was a public park, the area which is now Northbrook Park was previously a field with roughly the same dimensions as the original park, known locally as the Ten-Acre Field, despite actually only being 7 acres (2.8 ha) in size. The field was part of the Baring estates in Lee and was originally within the Lee civil parish of the Hundred of Blackheath, in the Lathe of Sutton at Hone, Kent. After the Local Government Act 1888 the field with the rest of Lee became part of the County of London in 1889 which was created that year.

In 1897 the Diamond Jubilee of Queen Victoria was celebrated, the following year in 1898 Thomas Baring, 1st Earl of Northbrook offered the land for public use to commemorate the Jubilee. After residents attended the London County Council's Parks and Open Spaces Committee in 1898, the new park was designed by Lt Col J J Sexby, Chief Officer of the London County Council's Parks Department. The park was officially opened by Mr John Piggott on 14 March 1903 and named Northbrook Park after Thomas Baring's title. Later that year, in May 1903, an engraved sundial was erected at the front of the park, near the path between the two gates, to mark the gift of the land by Lord Northbrook, and the commemoration of Queen Victoria's Jubilee.

After the London Government Act 1899, The County of London was split into boroughs in 1900, and Northbrook Park became part of the South ward of the Metropolitan Borough of Lewisham. In turn, after the London Government Act 1963, the County of London was abolished and replaced with the larger Greater London in 1965. Northbrook Park was then included within the London Borough of Lewisham which was created that year, and remains to the present. Between 1978 and 1998 Northbrook Park was within the St. Mildred's electoral ward. The Lewisham electoral wards were revised, and since 2002 Northbrook Park has been within the Grove Park ward.

=== Previous features ===
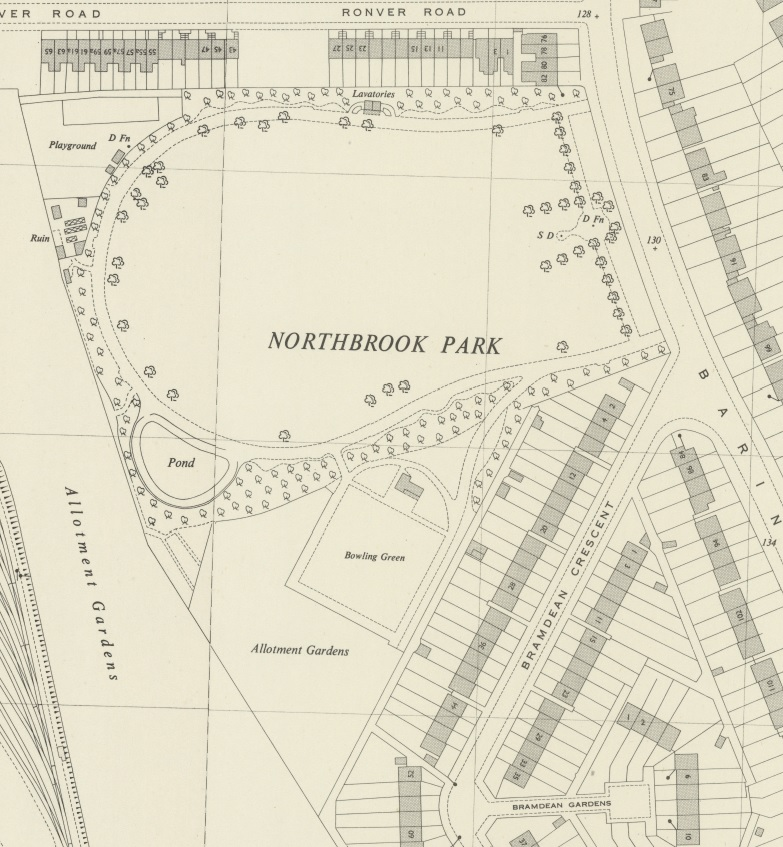
Section of Ordnance Survey map surveyed in 1948 and published in 1949 showing features of Northbrook Park and surrounding area at that time

There was a pond in the southwest corner of the Ten-Acre Field from at least the 1870s, which was incorporated as a feature at the back of Northbrook Park. Two drinking fountains were installed in the park near the path, one at the front where the plinth still remains, and another at the rear in the northwest corner. In May 1903 permission for the construction of a sundial was granted, it was erected at the front of the park near the drinking fountain and the stone base was engraved with words describing the gift of the land by Lord Northbrook commemorating Queen Victoria's Diamond Jubilee. A small group of buildings including greenhouses were constructed at the very back of the park next to the western fence, The part of the main field at the front of Northbrook Park was set aside as two sports fields, a bowling green in the northeast corner, and a tennis court in the southeast corner.

In the 1940s the sports fields at the front of the park were removed, and a separate square bowling green was added to the south of the main field on land which was originally outside the park boundaries. Around the same time a triangular piece of land south of the new bowling green started being used for gardening allotments, as was a 2 km long stretch of land to the west of the park border following the railway line, all the way from Grove Park in the south to St. Mildred's Road to the north. By the 1940s public toilets had been added to Northbrook Park off on the north side off the path and a children's playground had also been constructed just off the path in the northwest corner of Northbrook Park near the greenhouses and other buildings, which came to include climbing frames, swings, roundabouts, seesaws, and slides.

By the 1980s the pond had been filled in and paved over, near that site a brick wall roughly 2 metres (6 ft 7 in) tall and 30 metres (98 ft 5 in) long became a popular graffiti location and was designated as a legal graffiti site; the drinking fountain at the front of the park was also demolished. Most of the buildings at the back of the park were demolished and the area just south of the playground became a paddling pool. Almost all of the allotments had disappeared by the 1980s, leaving two small patches, one to the south at Grove Park and one to the northwest of the park next to St. Mildred's Road, the allotments immediately west of Northbrook Park became woodland. The triangular piece of land to the south of the park and new bowling green also ceased to be used as allotments and the land became part of Northbrook Park increasing its area to its current size of 9 acres (3.6 ha).

=== Recent history ===
In the 1990s Northbrook Park's bowling green stopped being used, the green itself remains but is now designated as a dog exercise area. The toilets, playground and pool were all demolished around 2000, and a newer children's playground was constructed at the front of the park in the northeast corner near the path and sundial, this playground was smaller than the previous one, with a swing, a slide and a climbing frame, designed for younger children. The southern triangular part of the park that was previously allotments has been designated as a forest school area. In the 2000s the legal graffiti wall was demolished.

In 2010 a local 7-year-old boy named Ryan Wells sent a letter and photographs to the Mayor of Lewisham, Sir Steve Bullock, asking for Northbrook Park to be improved, with concerns over, lack of facilities in the park especially for older children, disrepair of playground equipment, litter, antisocial behaviour, dog faeces and aggressive dogs. Bullock met with Wells, and the Grove Park assembly was awarded £10,000 for improvements to the park, for improving play equipment for older children and tidying up overgrown areas. Wells, with help from his mother, Michelle Ball, and others set up a Community Group and raised £225,000 from various groups including the Grove Park Assembly, London and Quadrant Housing, Groundwork Community Spaces and many others. The community group applied for lottery funding, and were accepted. £50,000 of the raised money was awarded by National Lottery Community Fund, when the cause won the public's vote on People's Millions. Among the improvements were, erecting a short metal fence surrounding the central field to prevent dogs fouling on the play area or bothering playing children, and adding more equipment to the playground, such as a zipline, a splash pool, a basket swing, a net climbing frame, a roundabout for toddlers, a sandpit and a hammock. In 2012 the £10,000 Mayor's Fund paid for the installation of a new drinking fountain at the front of the park near the playground, the following year in 2013, some of the raised funds paid for a fenced multipurpose game court which was constructed on the site of the previous pond.

In 2015 Northbrook Park Community Group was successful in an application for funding, and was awarded a £3,000 grant from SELCHP towards clearing and improving an overgrown area at the back of the park, with new fences, small gates, a pathway, a sensory garden and bird feeders. Northbrook Park has won the Green Flag Award in 2017, 2020, and 2021, a flag pole was erected at the front of the park near the sundial to celebrate the award.
