= Burnt Ash Pond =

Nature reserve in Lee, London, England

Coordinates: 51.4421°N 0.0208°E

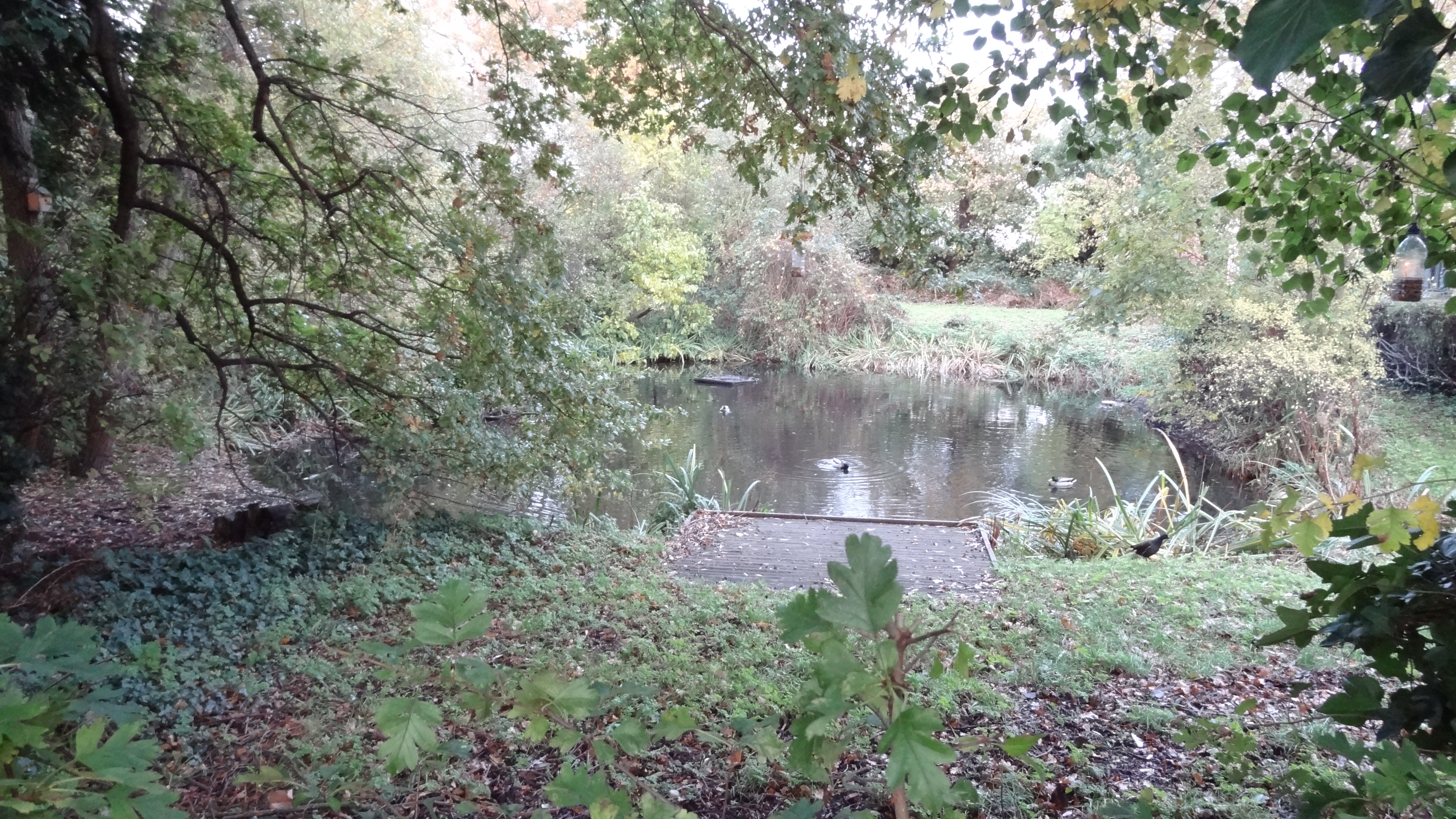

Burnt Ash Pond is a local nature reserve in Lee in the London Borough of Lewisham. It is a pond surrounded by railings in Melrose Close. It is not normally open to the public, but can be viewed from the road.

It is thought to have been originally an old farm pond, and by 1908 it was in the garden of a large house, which has since been demolished. When Lewisham Council built the houses in Melrose Close in 1983–84 the local branch of the London Wildlife Trust campaigned to preserve the pond, and it is now managed by the council as an educational nature reserve. The pond is well vegetated both in the pond and on its margins. Plants include yellow iris, great willowherb and hoary willowherb.
