= Elmstead =

Elmstead may refer to:

- Elmstead, Essex, a village in Essex, England
  - Elmstead Market, a hamlet in Essex, England
- Elmstead, London, an area of Greater London, England
  - Elmstead Pit, a geological SSSI
  - Elmstead Wood, a woodland
  - Elmstead Woods railway station
- Elmstead, Ontario, an area of the town of Lakeshore, Ontario, Canada

== See also ==
- Elmsted, a village in Kent, United Kingdom
