= Sundridge, London =

Coordinates: 51.4137°N 0.0221°E

Sundridge Park
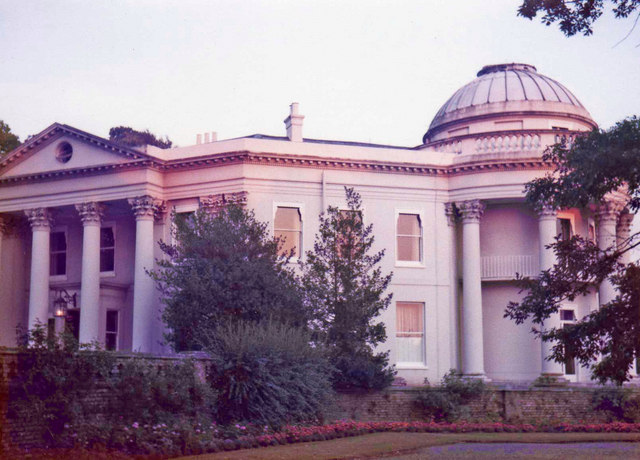
- Sundridge Park Manor

- Location within Greater London
- London borough: Bromley
- Ceremonial county: Greater London
- Region: London
- Country: England
- Sovereign state: United Kingdom
- Post town: BROMLEY
- Postcode district: BR1
- Dialling code: 020
- Police: Metropolitan
- Fire: London
- Ambulance: London
- UK Parliament: Bromley and Biggin Hill
- London Assembly: Bexley and Bromley

Sundridge Park, also known simply as Sundridge, is an area of Greater London within the London Borough of Bromley and prior to 1965 it was in the historic county of Kent. It is situated north of Bromley, north-west of Widmore and Bickley, south of Grove Park and south-east of Downham. In the twentieth century Sundridge names began to overlap somewhat with neighbouring Plaistow, for example, the main Sundridge shopping parade by the station sits directly east of Plaistow Green, with business and facilities in the area using the two names interchangeably, and Plaistow Cemetery is actually on the Sundridge side of the border. However, during the early twenty first century there have been deliberate attempts to re-establish the separate identities of both villages, Sundridge has its own village sign, and representation has been made to the local council for a village sign for Plaistow. Plaistow refers especially to the area north of Sundridge Park station along Burnt Ash Lane, part of the A2212 road which runs north to south between Grove Park and Bromley.

== History ==
Originally known as 'Sundresse', it is first mentioned in a charter of 987. In the middle ages the land was owned by the Le Blund family. In the early 1700s a large house was built on the site of Sundridge Park Manor; it was purchased and demolished by Sir Claude Scott in 1795, and the current building built in its place set in parkland.

== Sundridge Park mansion ==
Sundridge Park Manor is a Grade I listed mansion that was designed by John Nash and built by Samuel Wyatt. It has been used as a management and conference centre but is to be split into luxury apartments, a process that was underway as of March 2020. Much of the mansion's former grounds now forms Sundridge Park Golf Club.

== Politics and government ==
Sundridge is part of the Bickley and Sundridge ward for elections to Bromley London Borough Council.

== Transport ==
=== Rail ===
Sundridge Park railway station, provides the area with National Rail shuttle services to Bromley North and Grove Park where connections can be made for services to London Charing Cross and London Cannon Street via Lewisham as well as to Orpington and Sevenoaks.

=== Buses ===
Sundridge is served by four London Buses routes

- 126 to Bromley or to Eltham via Grove Park & Mottingham.
- 261 to Lewisham via Grove Park & Lee Green or to Locksbottom via Bromley & Bromley Common
- 314 to Eltham via Elmstead, Coldharbour & New Eltham or to New Addington via Bromley, Hayes, Coney Hall & Addington Village
- 336 to Catford via Downham & Bellingham and to Locksbottom via Bromley, Bickley, Southborough & Bromley Common

== Notable residents ==
- David Bowie - musician, lived at 4 Plaistow Grove from 1955–65.
- Peter Kropotkin - Russian anarchist, lived at 61 Crescent Road for a period.

== Gallery ==
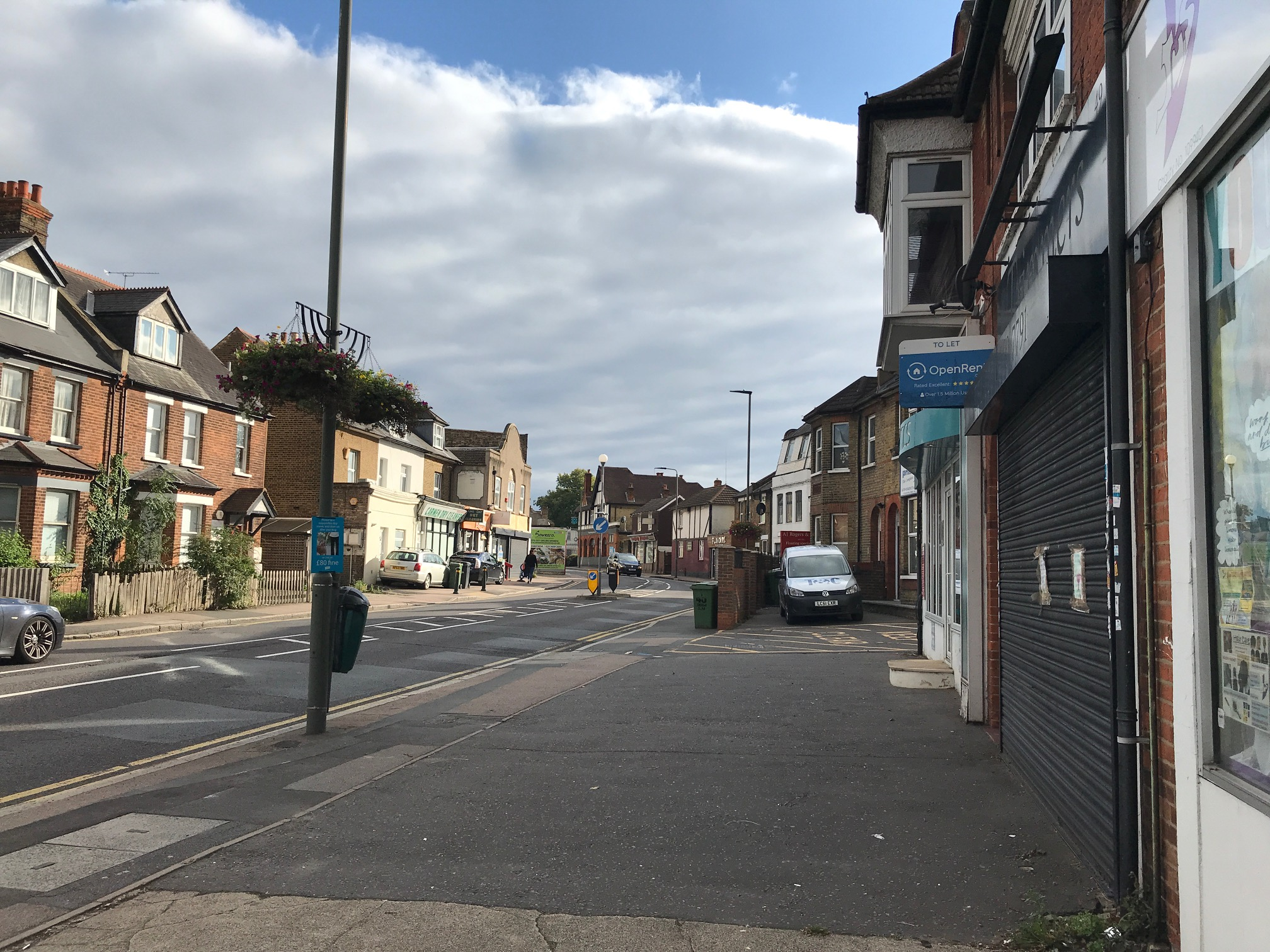
Shops along College Road

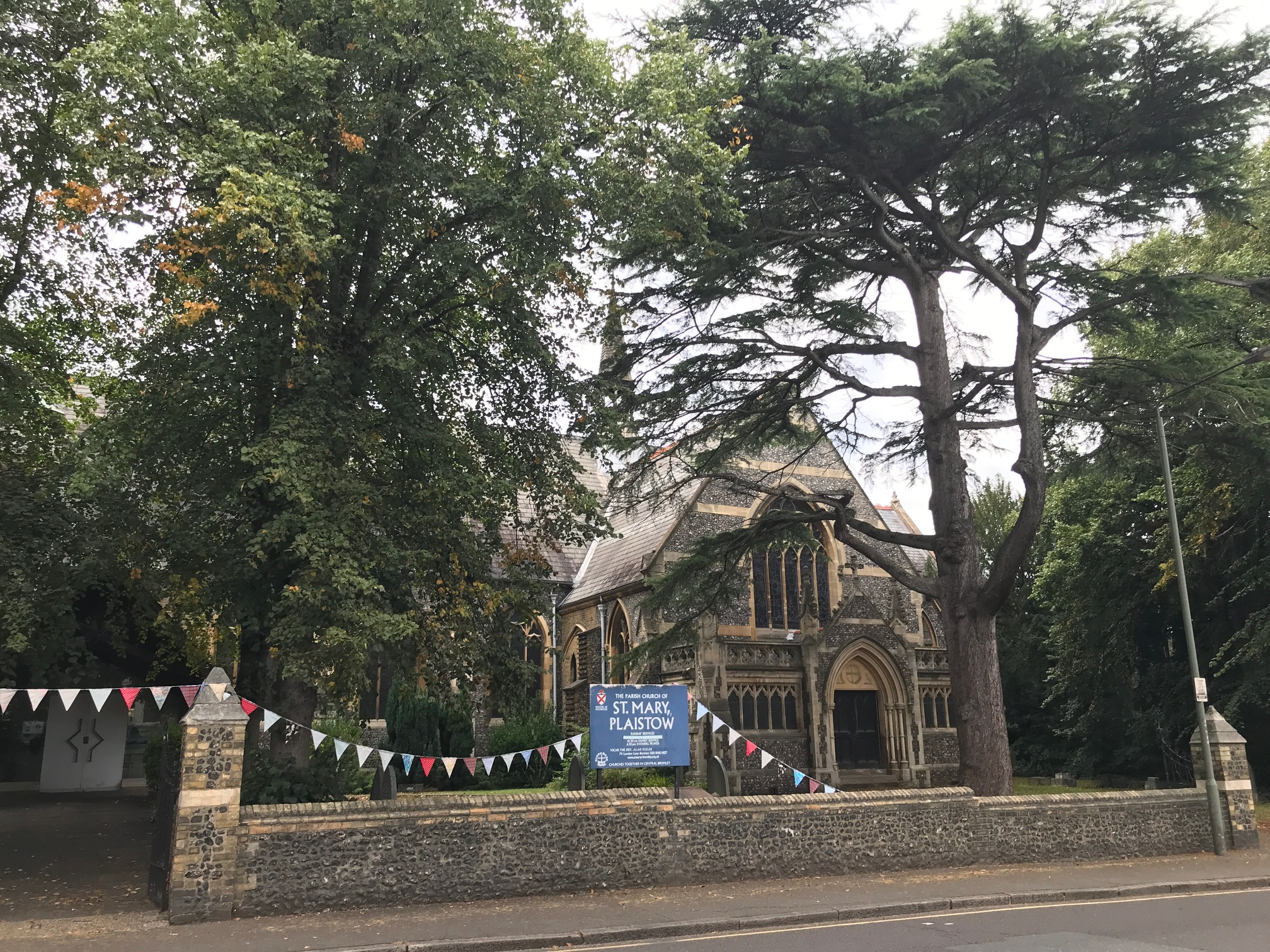
St Mary's Church, built 1861-63

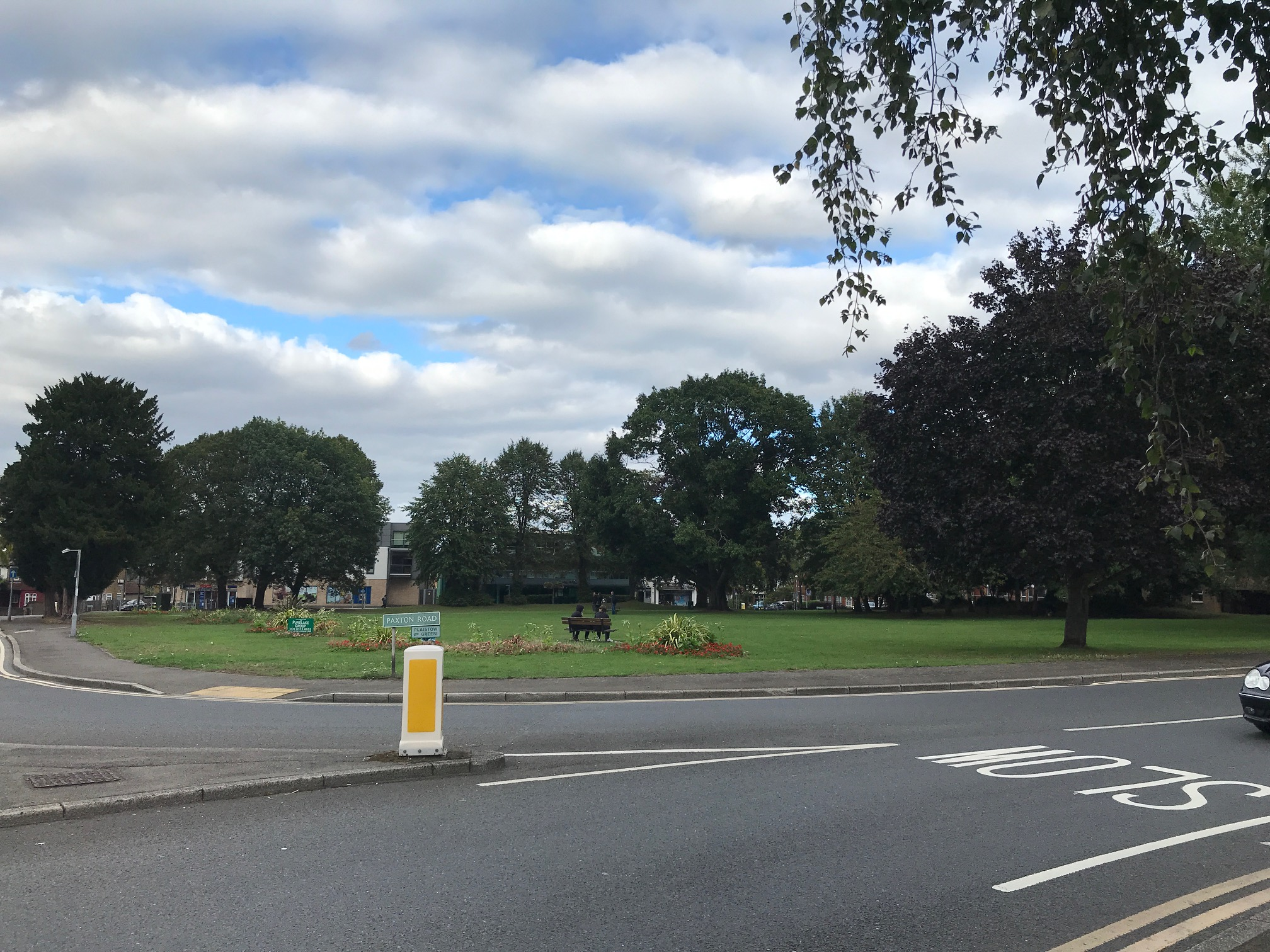
Plaistow Green

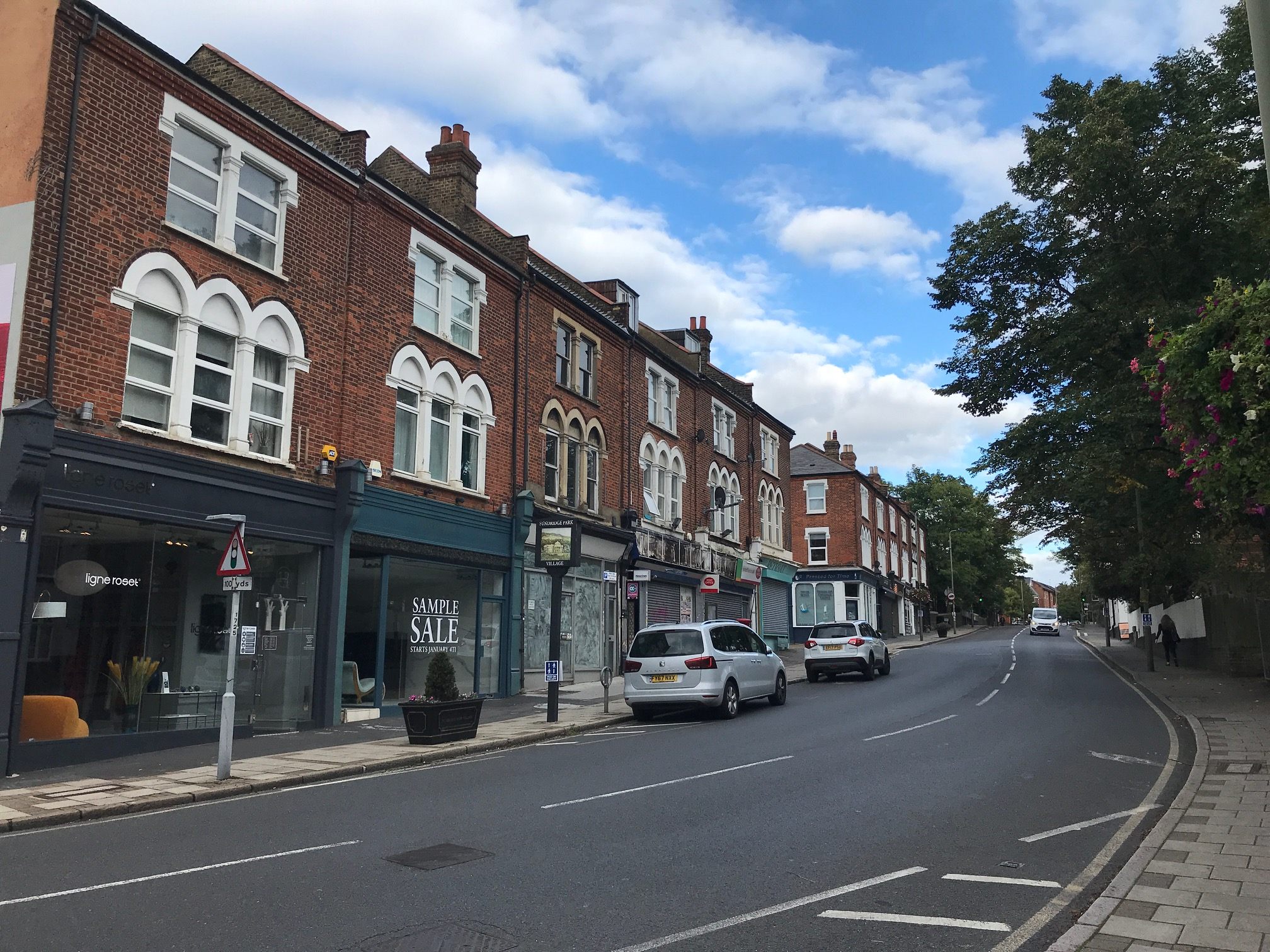
The shopping parade along Plaistow Lane, looking east

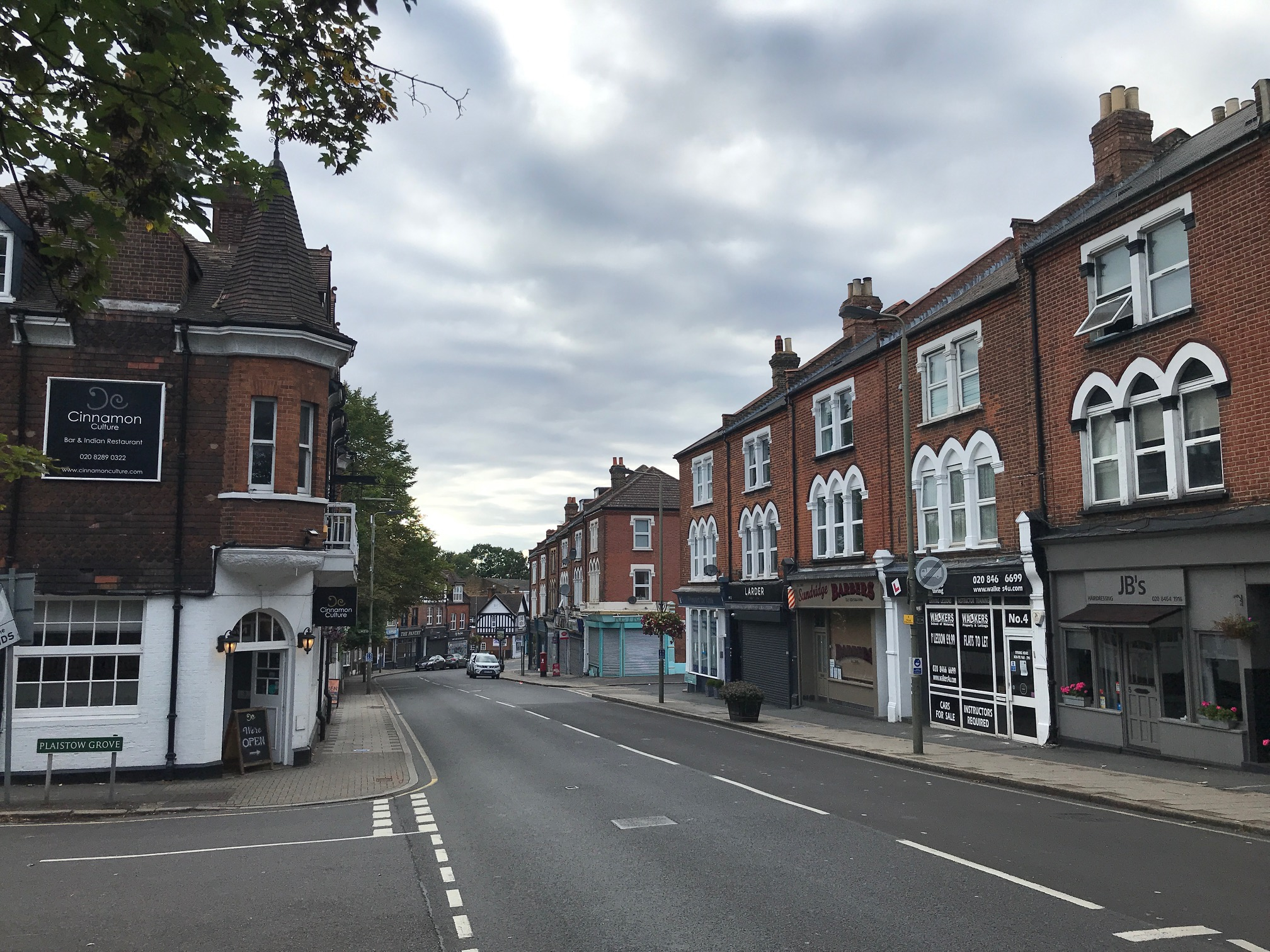
The shopping parade looking west

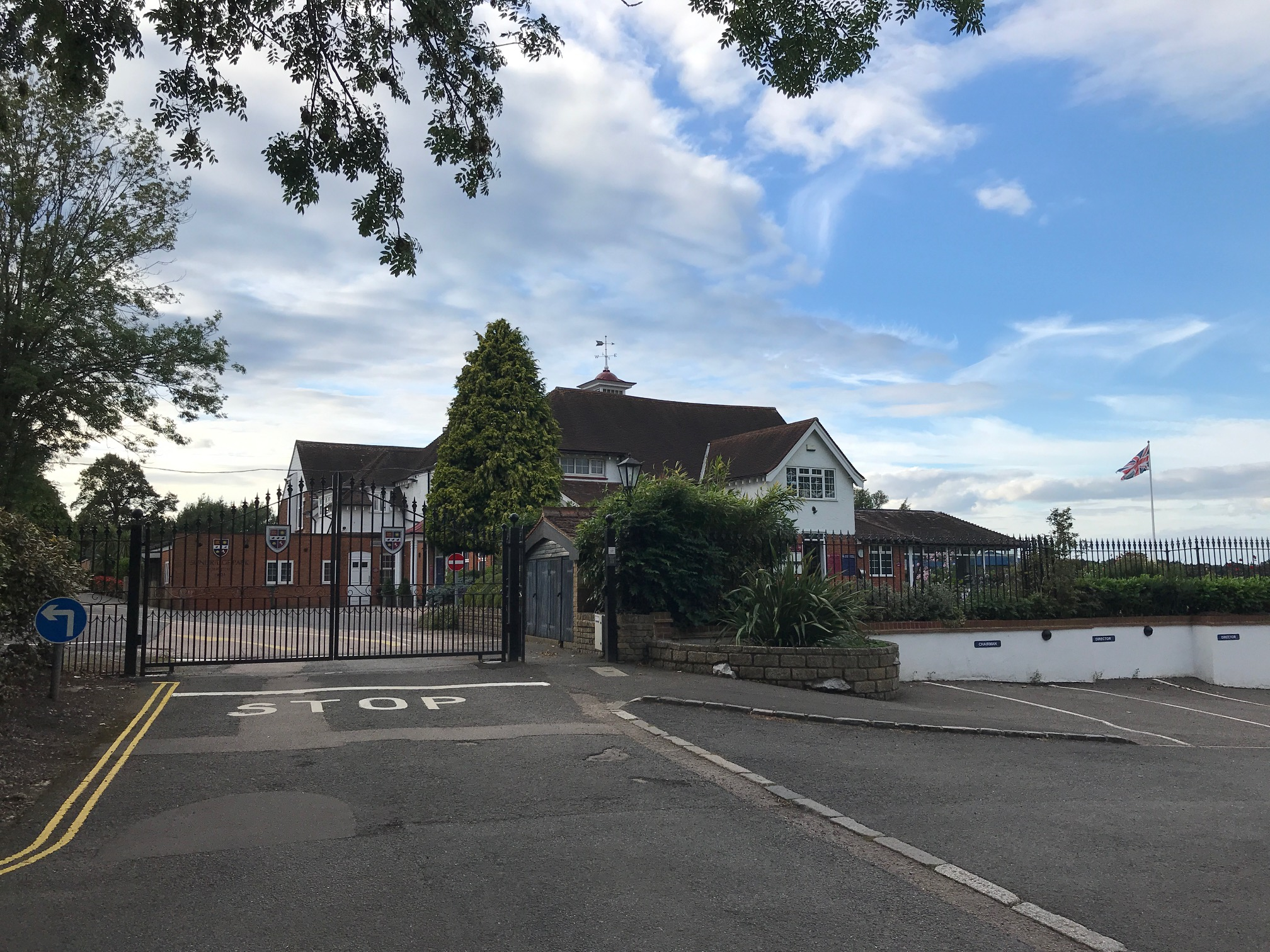
Sundridge Park Golf Club
