= Sundridge =

Sundridge may mean:

- Sundridge, Ontario, a village in Ontario, Canada
- Sundridge, Kent, a village in Kent, England
- Sundridge, London, a suburb in the London Borough of Bromley southeast London
  - Sundridge Park railway station, a railway station in the London Borough of Bromley
- Duke of Argyll, who holds a subsidiary title of Baron Sundridge
