= Plaistow, Bromley =

Coordinates: 51.413369°N 0.015561°E

Plaistow
- Location within Greater London
- Population: 15,122 (2011 Census. Plaistow and Sundridge Ward)
- London borough: Bromley
- Ceremonial county: Greater London
- Region: London
- Country: England
- Sovereign state: United Kingdom
- Postcode district: BR1
- Police: Metropolitan
- Fire: London
- Ambulance: London
- UK Parliament: Bromley and Biggin Hill
- London Assembly: Bexley and Bromley

Plaistow (/ˈplɑːstoʊ/ PLAHST-oh, /ˈplæstoʊ/ PLAST-oh, or /ˈpleɪstoʊ/ PLAYST-oh) is an area of south-east London located in the London Borough of Bromley and, until 1965, in the historic county of Kent. It is located south of Downham and Grove Park and north of Sundridge Park and Bromley. Nowadays Plaistow overlaps somewhat with Sundridge, for example the main Sundridge Park shopping parade by the station sits directly east of Plaistow Green, with business and facilities in the area using the two names interchangeably. Plaistow now refers especially to the area north of Sundridge Park station along Burnt Ash Lane, part of the A2212 road which runs north to south between Grove Park and Bromley.

== History ==
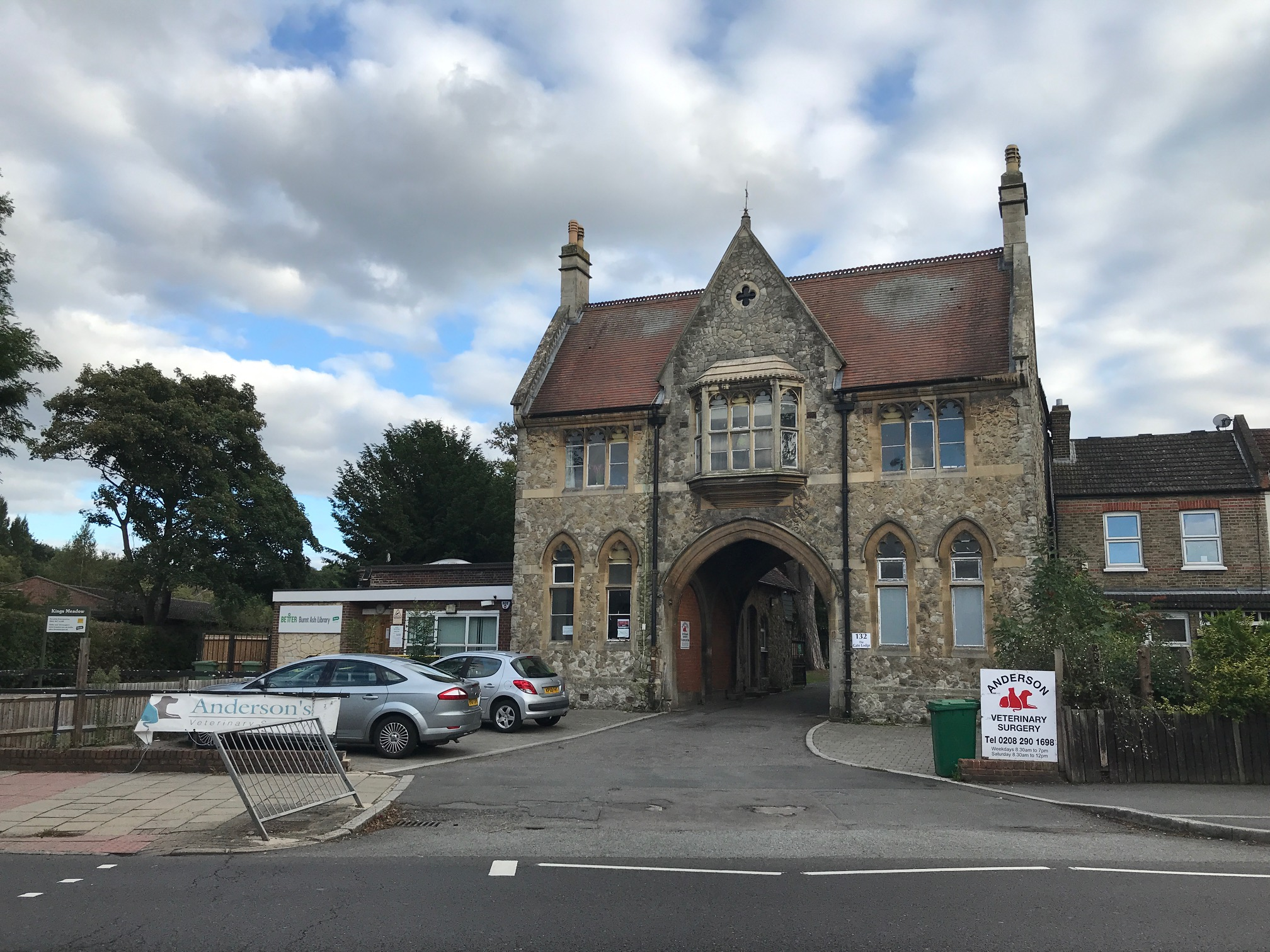
Entrance gate to Plaistow Cemetery, built by WR Mallett in 1893, with Burnt Ash Library to the left

The area is first mentioned in 1278, and is thought to refer to games that were played here. Much of the area was purchased by the banker Peter Thellusson in 1777, and he built Plaistow Lodge here as his home (now converted into Parish Church of England Primary School and listed at grade II*). An iron church was later built besides the lodge in 1875. Housing development by the People's Freehold Land Society began after the arrival of the railway in 1878 (later rebuilt in 1896). St Mary's Church was consecrated in 1863 and enlarged three times between 1881 and 1900. The churchyard closed for burials in 1893 when Plaistow Cemetery opened. In 1926 a wall was built along Valeswood Road after complaints by local residents that 'vulgar' working class persons from the Downham estate were cutting through the area on their way to Bromley town centre. The wall remained in place for roughly 10 years.

== Governance ==
Plaistow is part of the Bromley and Biggin Hill constituency for elections to the House of Commons of the United Kingdom.

Plaistow is part of the Plaistow ward for elections to Bromley London Borough Council.

== Gallery ==
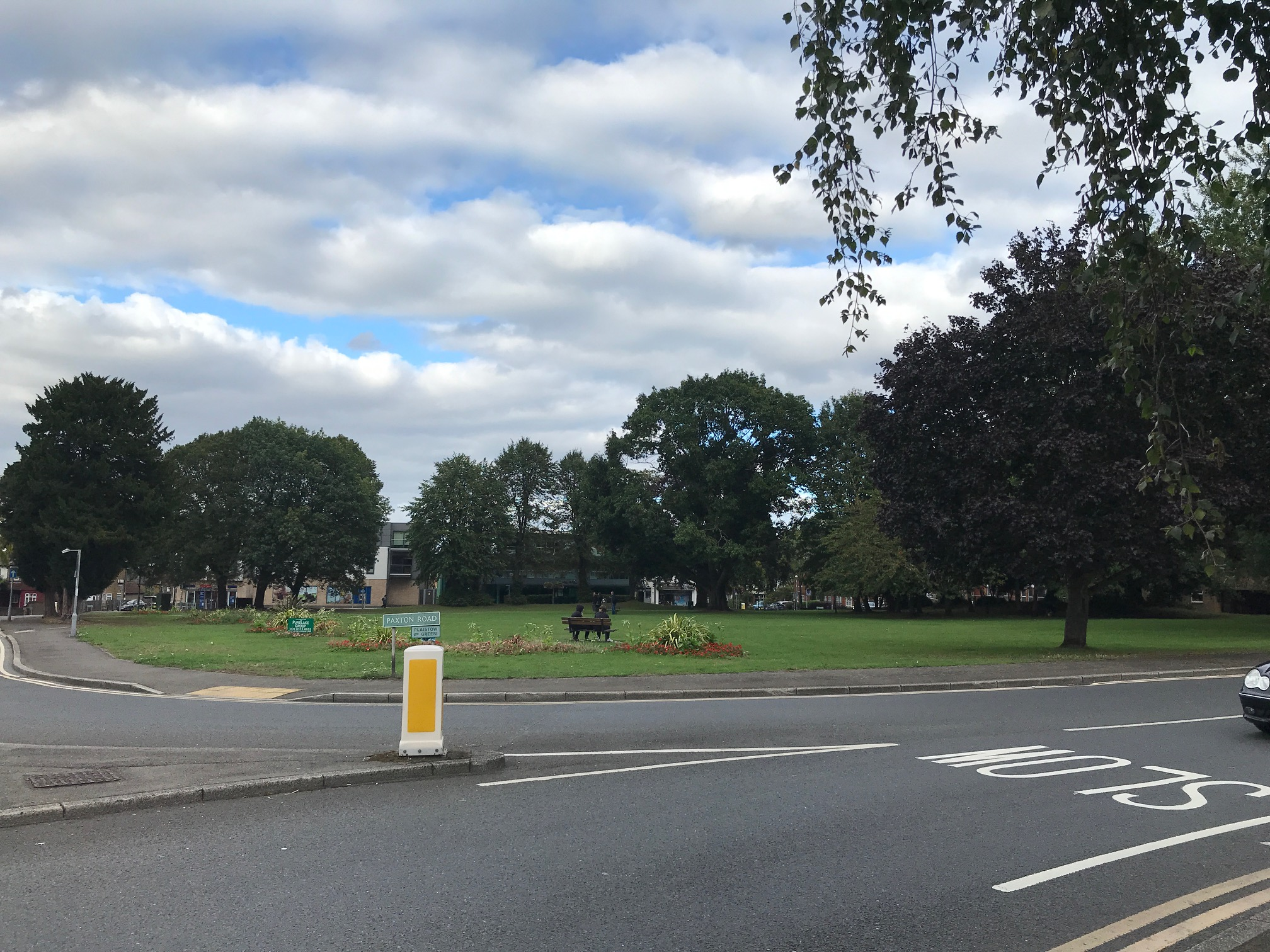
Plaistow Green

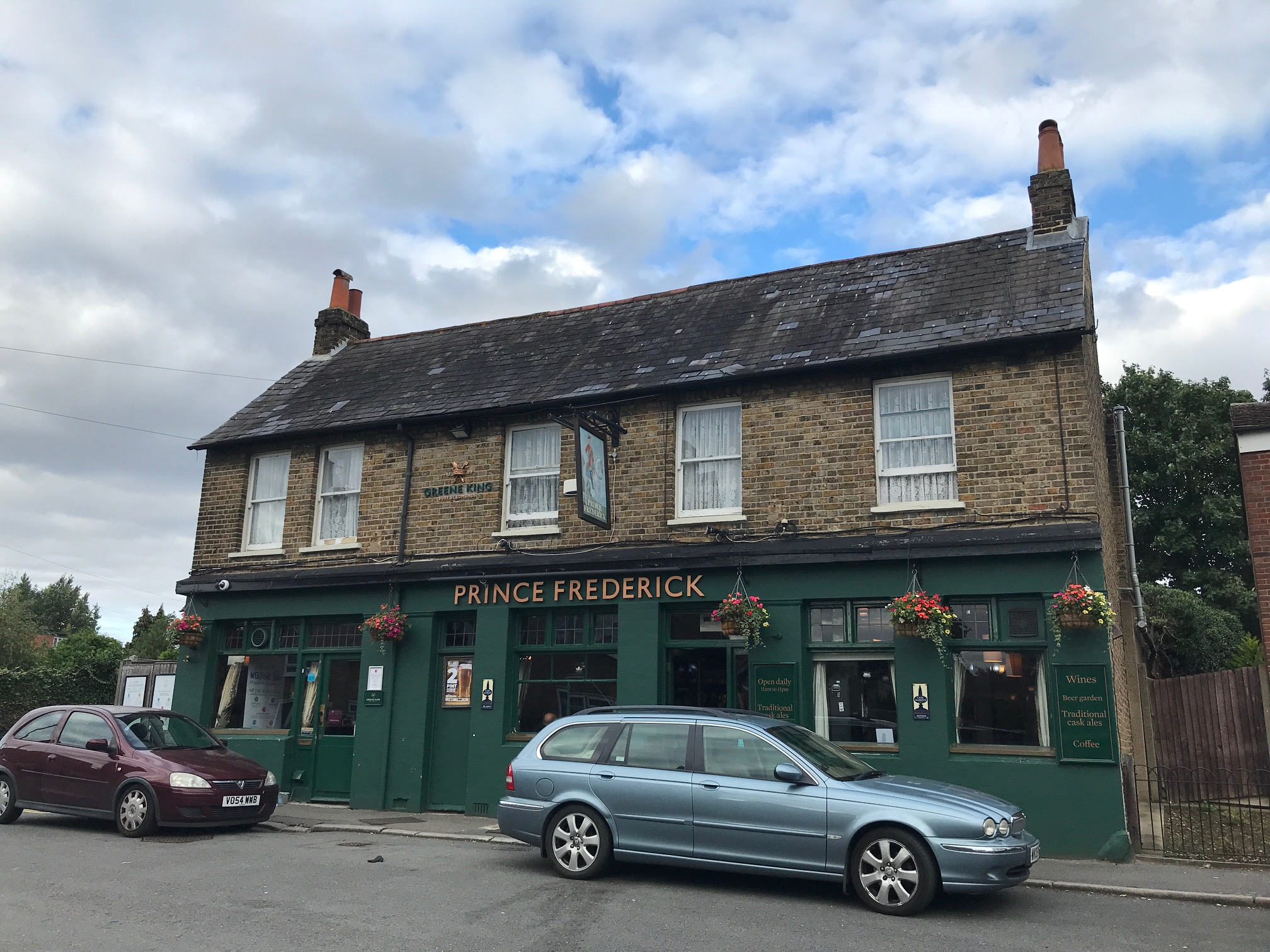
The Prince Frederick pub, Nichol Lane

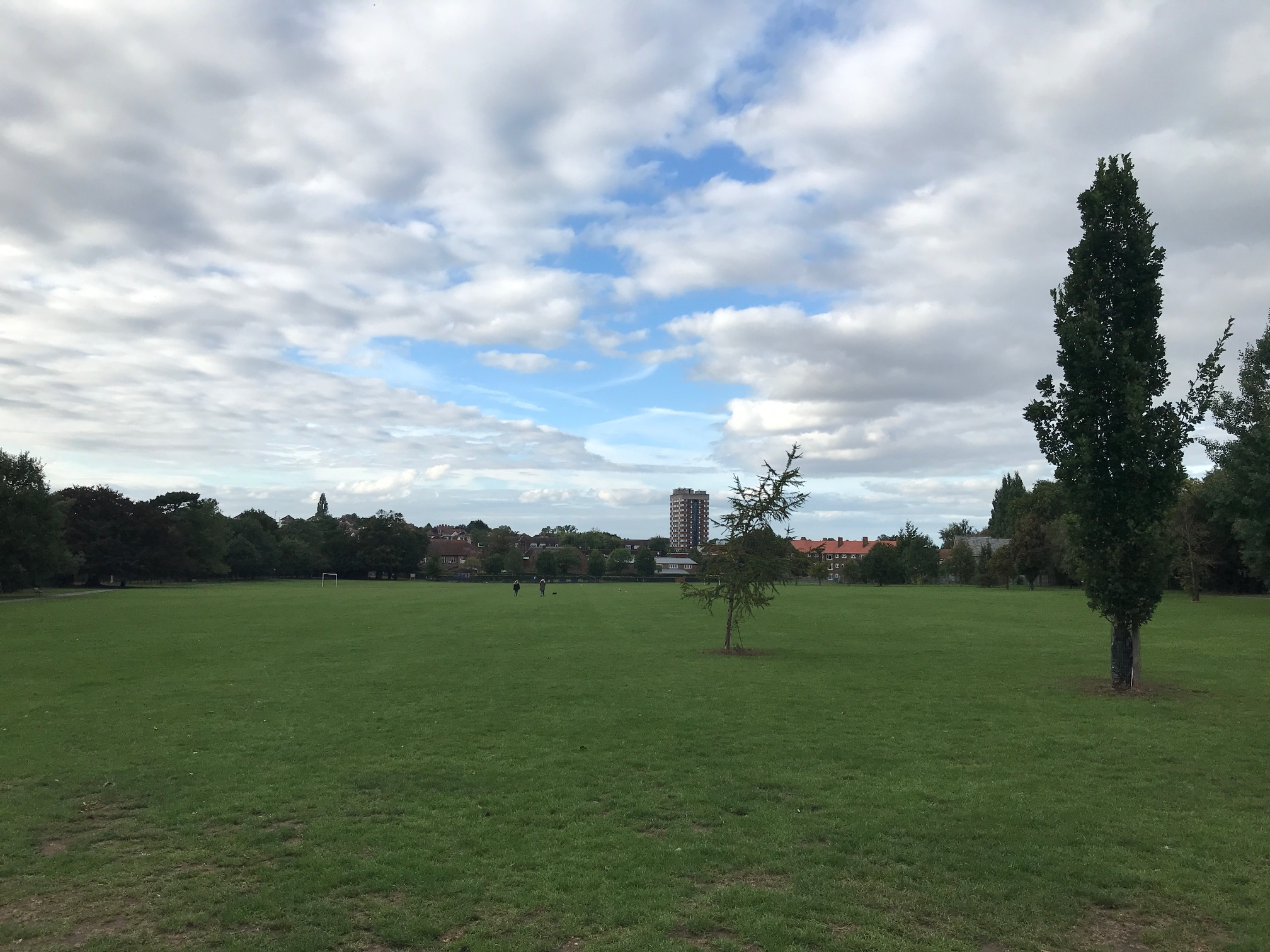
King's Meadow

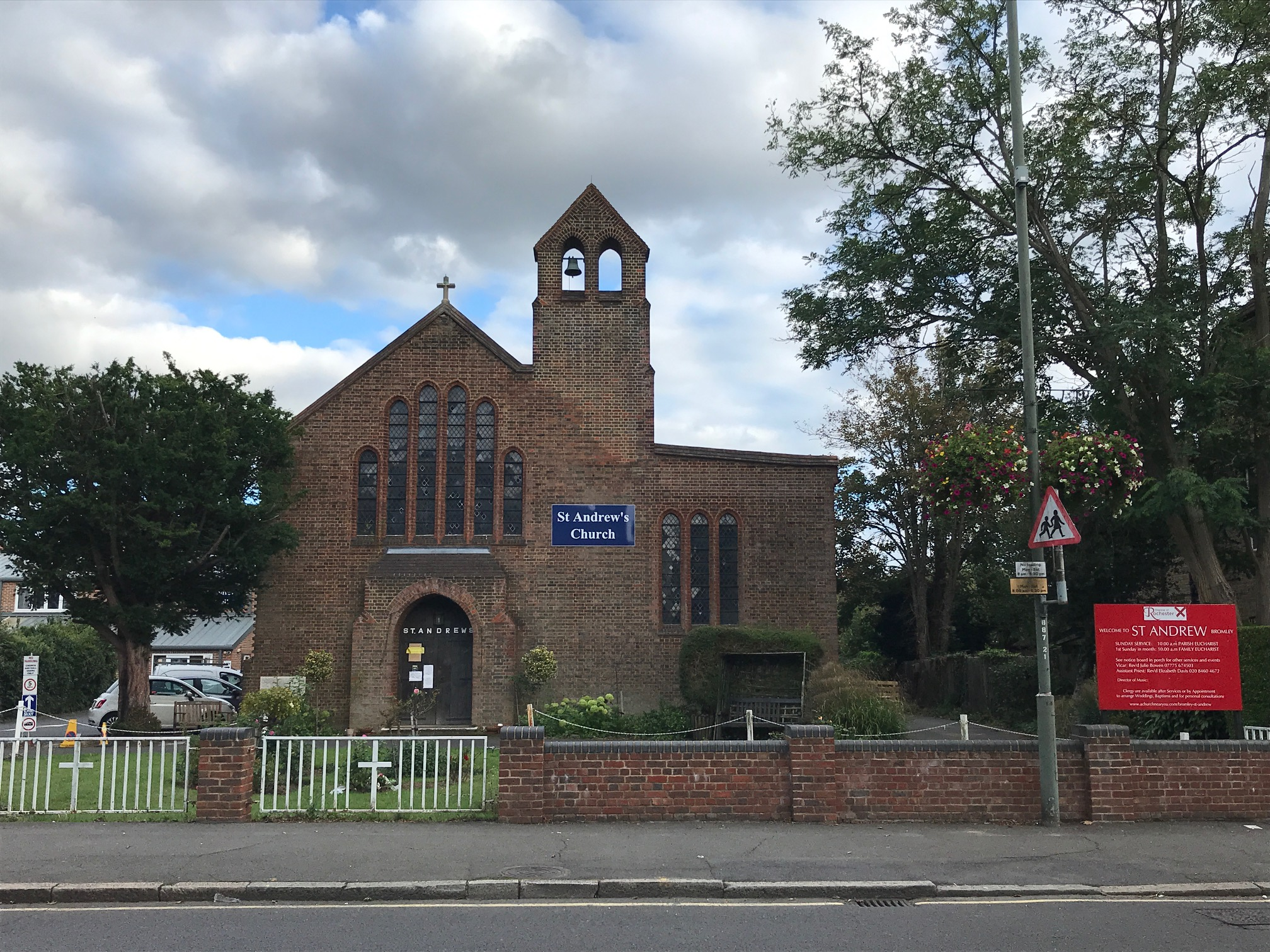
St Andrew's Church, Burnt Ash Lane, built in 1929 by Sir Charles Nicholson

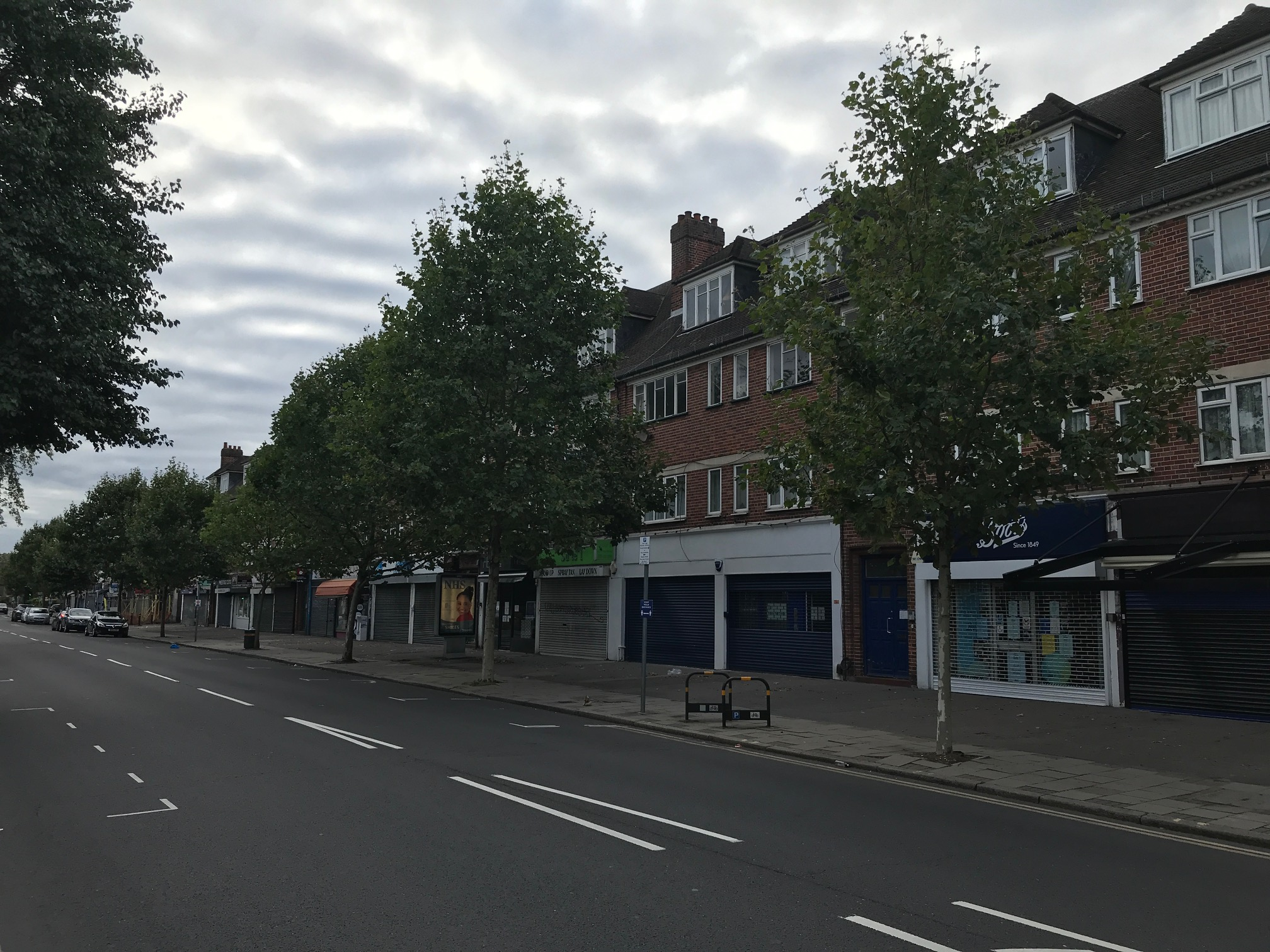
Shops along Burnt Ash Lane
