= Sundridge Park railway station =

National Rail station in London, England

Sundridge Park
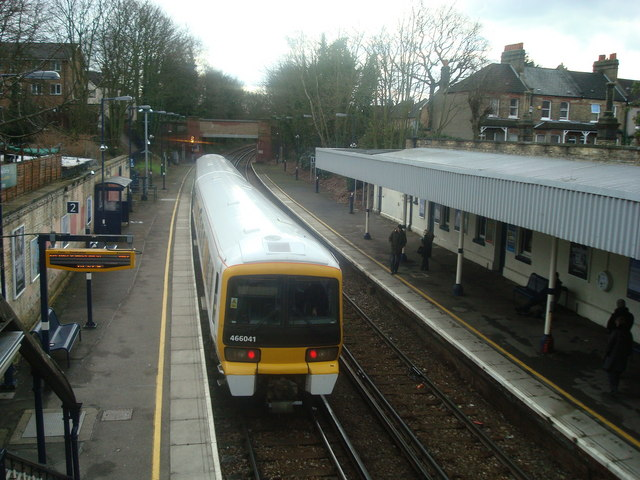
- Interactive map of Sundridge Park

General information
- Location: Sundridge
- Local authority: London Borough of Bromley
- Managed by: Southeastern
- Station code: SUP
- DfT category: E
- Number of platforms: 2
- Fare zone: 4

National Rail annual entry and exit
- 2020–21: ▼37,852
- 2021–22: ▲0.109 million
- 2022–23: ▲0.142 million
- 2023–24: ▲0.176 million
- 2024–25: ▲0.193 million

Key dates
- 1 January 1878: Opened as Plaistow
- 1 July 1894: renamed Sundridge Park

Other information
- External links: Departures; Facilities
- Coordinates: 51.4137°N 0.0221°E

Sundridge Park railway station serves Sundridge and Plaistow in the London Borough of Bromley in Greater London, in London fare zone 4. It is 10 miles 12 chains (16.3 km) down the line from Charing Cross.

The station, and all trains serving it, are operated by Southeastern.

== Location ==
Sundridge Park station is located between Bromley and Grove Park, on Plaistow Lane, Bromley, on the northern edge of the borough of Bromley. The station is so close to Bromley North (just 770 yards (700 m) up the line) that the latter's platform indicator is a part of the starting signal for the southbound platform. The station's namesake of the vast Sundridge Park, which is currently entirely occupied by a private golf course and inaccessible as a park, is located about 550 yards (500 m) north east of the station.

== Services ==
All services at Sundridge Park are operated by Southeastern using Class 465 EMUs.

The typical off-peak service is two trains per hour in each direction between Bromley North and Grove Park, from where connections are available to London Charing Cross, London Cannon Street, Orpington and Sevenoaks. The service is increased to three trains per hour during the morning peak only.

No services call at the station on Sundays or Bank Holidays.

100% of trains from Sundridge Park in 2024 arrived on time, one of five stations with this record.

Preceding station	National Rail	Following station
Grove Park	Southeastern Bromley North Line Monday-Saturday only	Bromley North

== Connections ==
London Buses route 314 serves the station.

== Future proposals ==
Proposals have been put forward by Transport for London and the London Borough of Bromley for the Bromley North Line to be extended and connected to either the Docklands Light Railway via a link south of Lewisham, to the Tramlink system from Beckenham Junction, or to an extension of the Bakerloo line from Elephant and Castle. These schemes have not been taken beyond the proposal stage and recommendations are expected to be published around 2017.

Additionally, it has been suggested that the Bromley North Line could be connected to London Overground via an extended service from New Cross, although the problems of line capacity make this seem an unlikely solution.

Bromley North Line

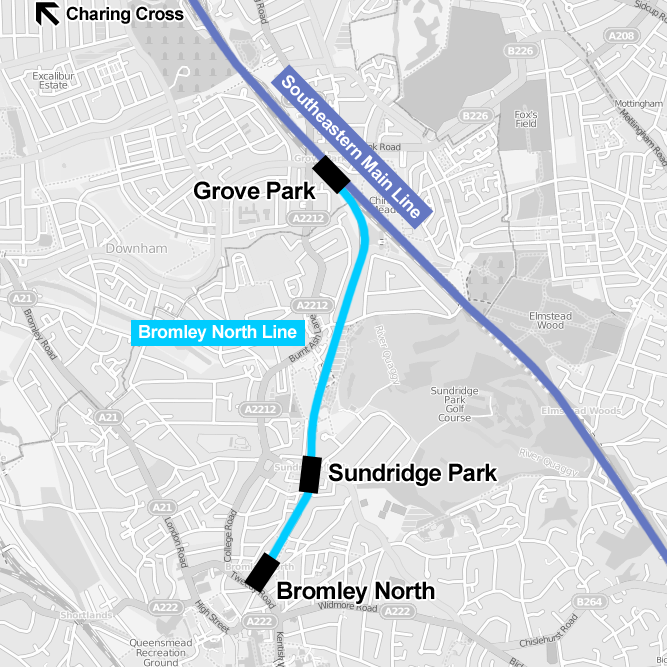
The Bromley North Line in south-east London

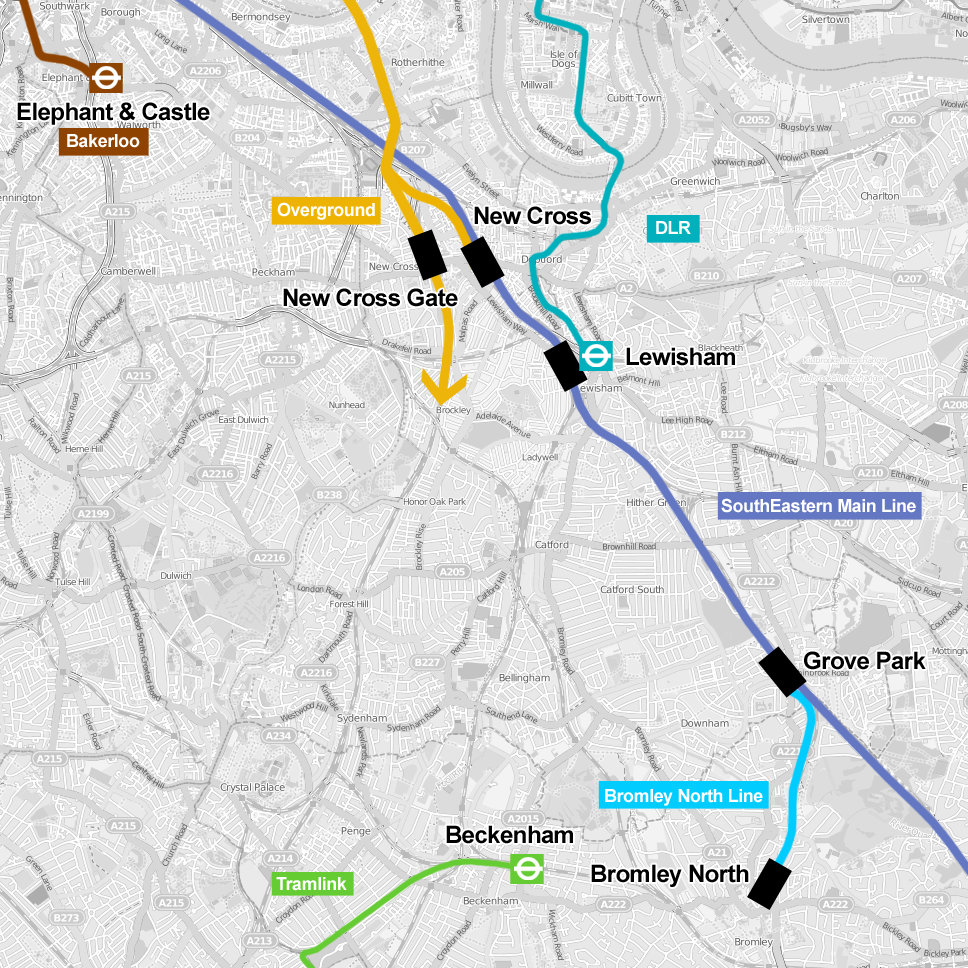
Nearby transport lines which have been proposed to be connected to the Bromley North Line in the future
