= Elmstead Pit =

Geological site in England

Coordinates: 51.4171°N 0.0453°E

- Site of Special Scientific Interest
- Location of Elmstead Pit.
- Area of search: Greater London
- Grid reference: TQ42327066
- Interest: Geological
- Area: 0.05 ha (0.12 acres)
- Notification date: 1985
- Location map: Magic Map

Elmstead Pit is a geological Site of Special Scientific Interest in Elmstead in the London Borough of Bromley. Formerly known as Rock Pits, it is a small site, with an area of 0.05 hectares (0.12 acres). It is a Geological Conservation Review site.

The pit exposes an important layer of the Oldhaven or Blackheath Beds laid down about 50 million years ago during the Eocene epoch. It has a rich and diverse selection of fossil fauna from a sub-tidal estuarine environment. Fossils include molluscs, sharks' teeth and fish scales. The geological features help to explain the changes in the disposition of land and sea in the London area during the Eocene.

The site is located opposite Elmstead Woods railway station, and there is no public access.

== See also ==
- List of Sites of Special Scientific Interest in Greater London
