= Elmstead, London =

Coordinates: 51.4155°N 0.0501°E

Elmstead
- Location within Greater London
- OS grid reference: TQ425705
- London borough: Bromley
- Ceremonial county: Greater London
- Region: London
- Country: England
- Sovereign state: United Kingdom
- Post town: CHISLEHURST
- Postcode district: BR7
- Dialling code: 020
- Police: Metropolitan
- Fire: London
- Ambulance: London
- UK Parliament: Eltham & Chislehurst
- London Assembly: Bexley and Bromley

Elmstead is a residential district in south-east London, England, within the London Borough of Bromley. It is located north-east of Bromley.

== History ==
=== Toponymy ===
The name is recorded in 1320 as Elmsted and means 'place where elm trees grow'. The name was shared with Elmstead Place mansion and the woodland of Elmstead Wood. After the local railway station opened it took the name Elmstead Woods.

== Geography ==
Elmstead Wood has public access from Elmstead Lane and other locations. It lies on the Green Chain walk. It is adjacent to Sundridge Park Golf Club.

Elmstead Pit, opposite the railway station, is a geological Site of Special Scientific Interest which has important fossils from the Eocene epoch 50 million years ago.

=== Nearby areas ===
Elmstead borders Mottingham to the north and north east, Chislehurst to the east and south east, Bickley to the south, Sundridge to the south west and west and Grove Park to the north west.

== Transport ==
=== Rail ===
Elmstead Woods railway station serves the area with Southeastern services to London Charing Cross and London Cannon Street via Lewisham as well as to Orpington and Sevenoaks.

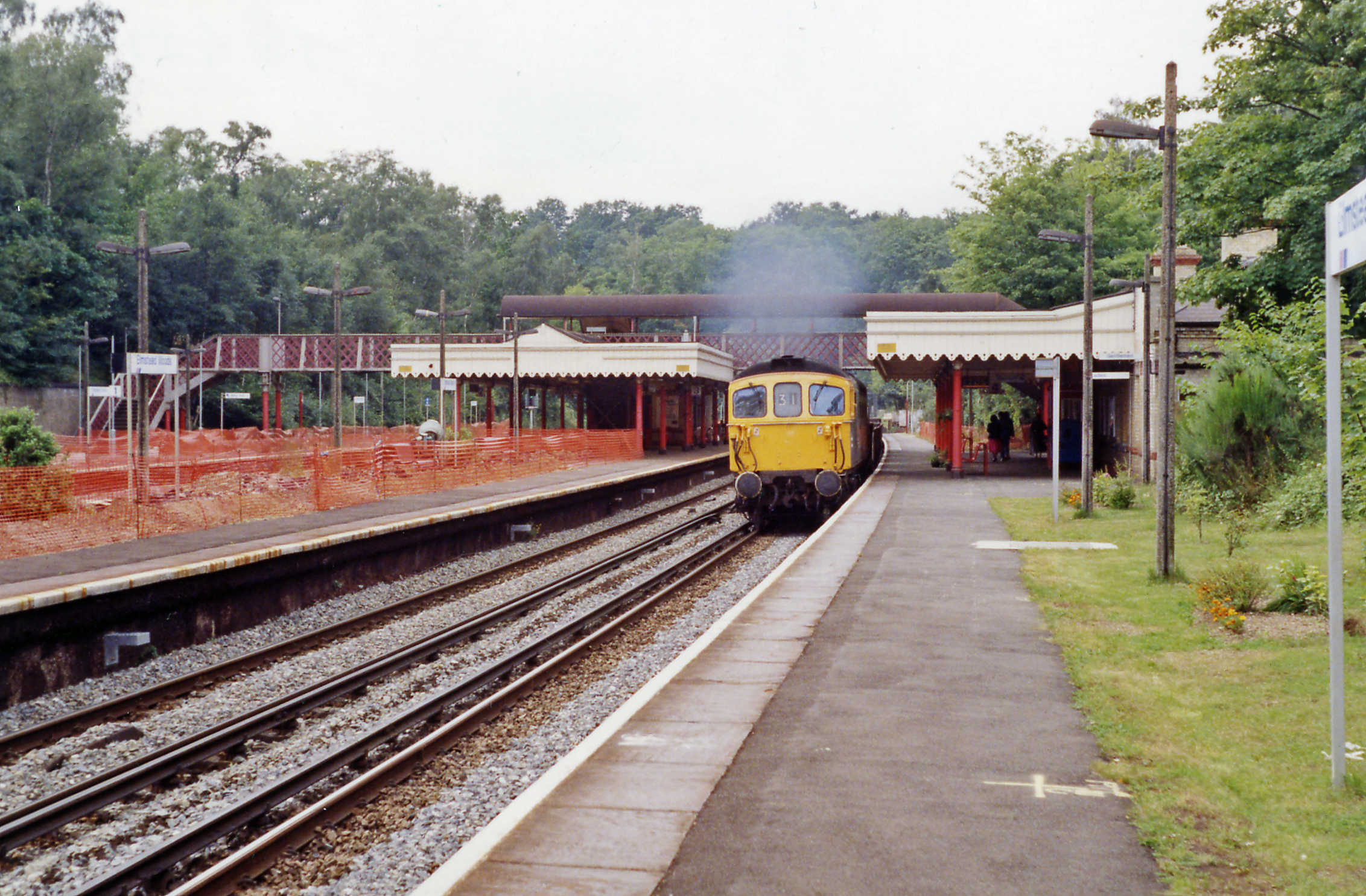
Elmstead Woods station, 1991

=== Buses ===
Elmstead is served by one Transport for London bus service.

- 314 to Eltham and to New Addington via Bromley.

== Sport ==
Elmstead has a senior football club, F.C. Elmstead, who play at Oakley Road in Bromley.
