= Grove Park railway station =

National Rail station in London, England

Grove Park
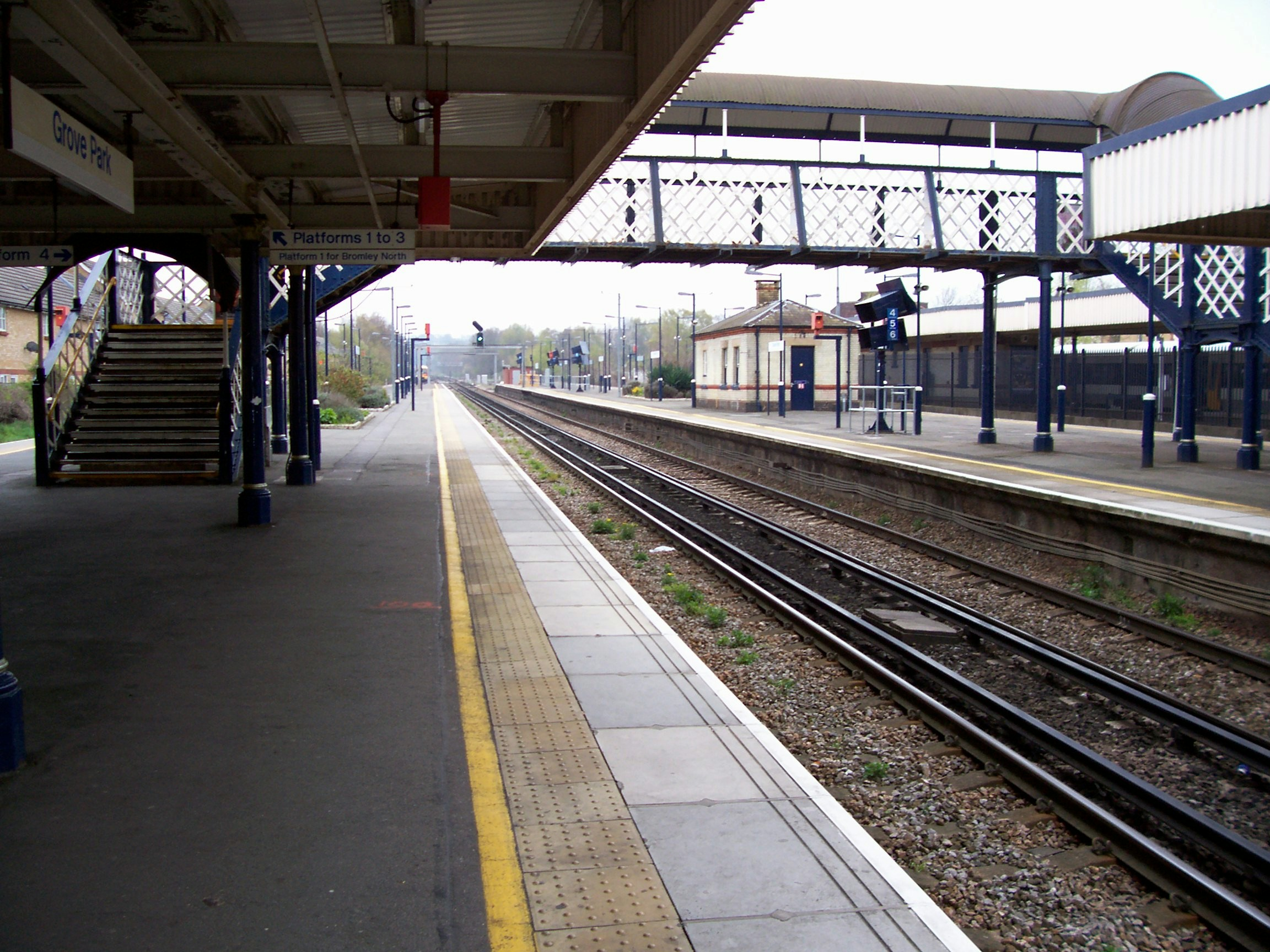
- Interactive map of Grove Park

General information
- Location: Grove Park
- Local authority: London Borough of Lewisham
- Managed by: Southeastern
- Station code: GRP
- DfT category: C2
- Number of platforms: 5
- Fare zone: 4

National Rail annual entry and exit
- 2020–21: ▼0.785 million
- Interchange: ▼81,447
- 2021–22: ▲1.584 million
- Interchange: ▲0.216 million
- 2022–23: ▲2.009 million
- Interchange: ▲0.276 million
- 2023–24: ▲2.138 million
- Interchange: ▲0.328 million
- 2024–25: ▲2.297 million
- Interchange: ▲0.365 million

Key dates
- 1 November 1871: Opened

Other information
- External links: Departures; Facilities
- Coordinates: 51.4306°N 0.0219°E

Grove Park is a railway station in southeast London, England. It is located on Baring Road (the A2212) within London fare zone 4, and serves the areas of Grove Park and Downham in the London Borough of Lewisham. It is 8 miles 78 chains (14.4 km) down the line from London Charing Cross.

It serves as an interchange between local South Eastern Main Line services and the Bromley North Line shuttle. Prior to 1952, there was also a connection to trams.

The station was opened in 1871.

== Platforms ==
As of September 2025, there are five platforms. Platform 1 serves Bromley North branch line, while platforms 2 to 5 are on the South Eastern Main Line, which runs from London Charing Cross and London Cannon Street to Dover. The adjacent stations are Elmstead Woods to the south, Hither Green to the north, and Sundridge Park on the Bromley North branch line.

== Services ==
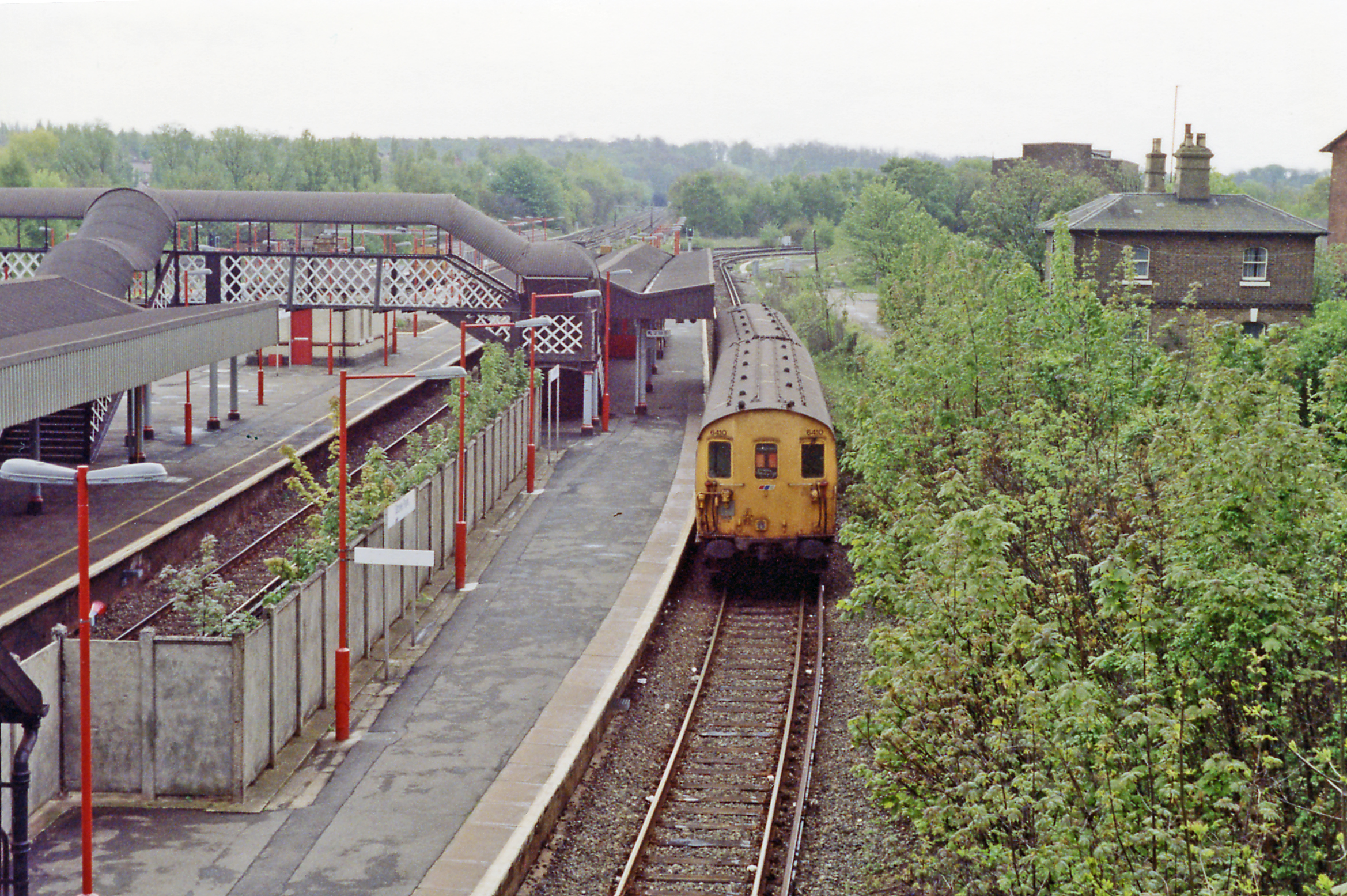
Grove Park station in Network SouthEast colours with a Class 416 calling in 1992

All services at Grove Park are operated by Southeastern using Class 376, 465, 466 and 707 EMUs.

The typical off-peak service in trains per hour is:

- 2 tph to London Charing Cross (non-stop from Lewisham to London Bridge)
- 2 tph to London Cannon Street (all stations except Lewisham)
- 4 tph to Orpington of which 2 continue to Sevenoaks
- 2 tph to Bromley North

On Sundays, the station is served by a half-hourly service between Sevenoaks and London Charing Cross via Lewisham, with no service to Bromley North.

Preceding station	National Rail	Following station
Hither Green	Southeastern Grove Park Line	Elmstead Woods
Terminus	Southeastern Bromley North Line Monday-Saturday only	Sundridge Park

== Connections ==
London Buses routes 124, 126, 136, 181, 261, 273, 284, 638, SL4 and night route N136 serve the station.
