= Bromley North Line =

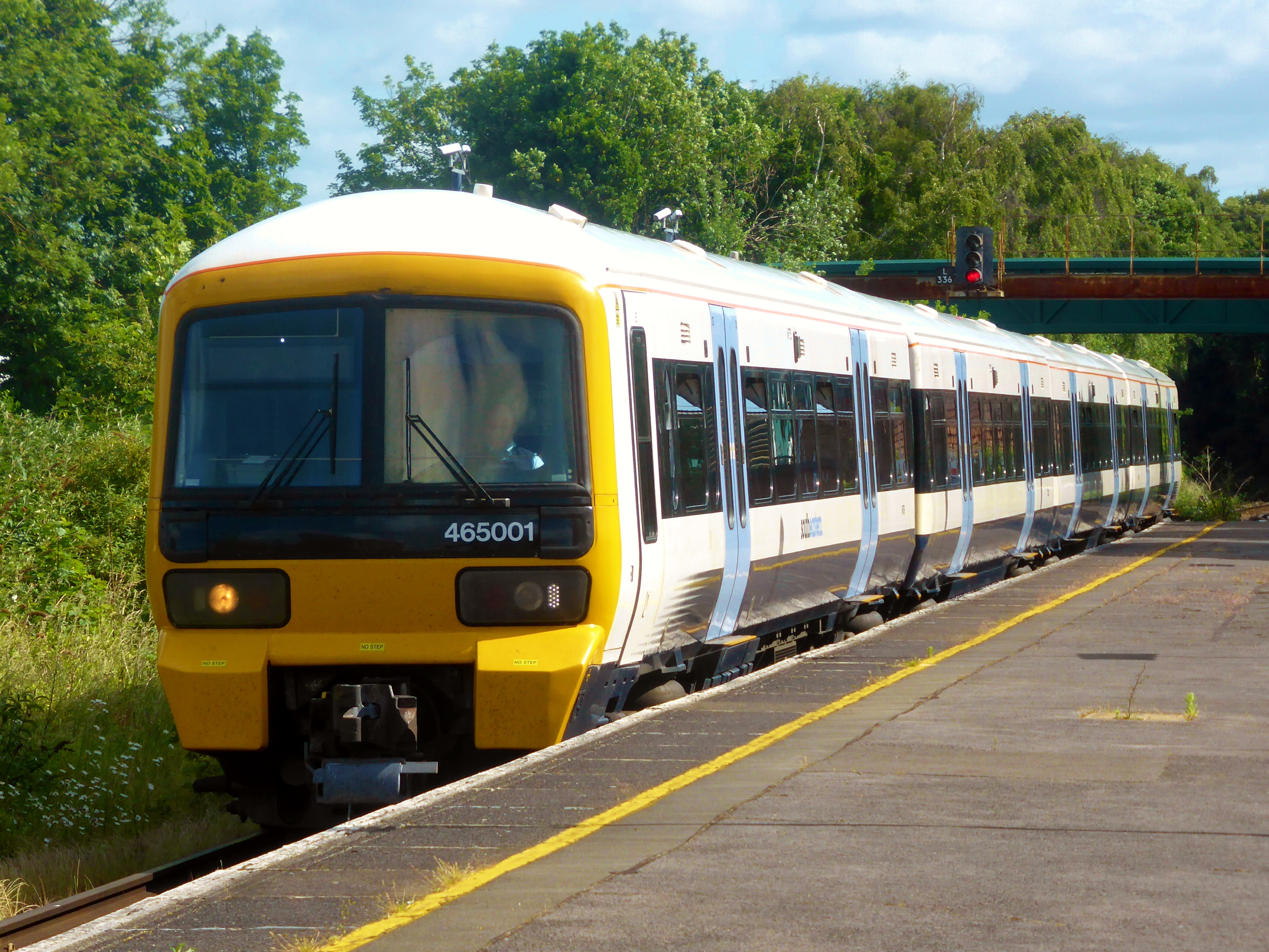
- Southeastern Class 465 unit 465001 at Bromley North.

Overview
- Status: Operational
- Owner: Network Rail
- Locale: Greater London
- Termini: Grove Park; Bromley North
- Stations: 3

Service
- Type: Suburban rail, Heavy rail
- System: National Rail
- Services: 1
- Operator: Southeastern
- Depot: Hither Green
- Rolling stock: Class 465 "Networker"

Technical
- Num of tracks: 2
- Character: Branch line
- Track gauge: 1,435 mm (4 ft 8 1/2 in) standard gauge
- Electrification: 750 V DC third rail
- Operating speed: 40 mph (64 km/h)

The Bromley North line is a less than 2-mile (3.2 km) long branch line in Greater London that connects at Grove Park with the South Eastern Main Line operated by Southeastern. Since the 1990s, the line which has two stations of its own has been served almost exclusively by shuttle services to and from Grove Park railway station in the London Borough of Lewisham, where passengers can change trains for onward journeys towards Central London, as well as towards Kent. Network Rail records the line as route SO350.

== History ==
The line was built by the 'Bromley Direct Railway Company', in co-operation with the South Eastern Railway (SER), to compete with the London, Chatham and Dover Railway, which owned the other Bromley station, Bromley South. It was authorised by the Bromley Direct Railway Act 1874 (37 & 38 Vict. c. cxix), and opened on 1 January 1878 and was worked by the SER from the outset. The two companies were merged the following year by the South-eastern Railway Act 1879 (42 & 43 Vict. c. cliii).

The line was electrified at 750 V DC (third rail) with the other SECR urban routes from 1926 by Southern Railway.

== Services ==
A shuttle service operates, known by the staff as "the popper". The service is two trains per hour in each direction. This service increases to three trains per hour during morning peak time. There are no services on Sundays and public holidays on the branch line, however this will be introduced from December 2026.

Through services were originally operated from Bromley North to Holborn Viaduct, Victoria, Cannon Street and Charing Cross. These were cut to a peak-hours only service in 1976, and were then withdrawn completely in 1990, except during engineering works.

== Trains ==
Class 465 rolling stock primarily operates on this route. Until 2010 this was the only 'true branch', that is branch-only service, in Greater London for trains to be worked with a driver and a guard. Since 2010 this is now driver-only, as mirrors and monitors have been provided on the platforms to allow the driver to look back.

== Future proposals ==
The Southeastern Main Line into central London is at full capacity. Service patterns have begun to entrench all longer distance service destinations as direct, many trains per hour, stations. Therefore, Southeastern consider that it is not economically justifiable to reinstate direct services from Bromley North into central London, and consequently all (non-contingency Bromley South backup) services must terminate at Grove Park for the foreseeable future.

Various proposals have been put forward to convert the Bromley North Line to an alternative mode of transport to make better use of this isolated piece of rail infrastructure. In the 1980s, a plan to partially convert the line into a heritage railway using retired London Underground rolling stock was considered, but did not ultimately come to fruition.

Transport for London have indicated that they are considering a number of possible options for connecting the Bromley North Line to one of the other public transport systems in London, including:

- incorporation into the Docklands Light Railway via a link south of Lewisham
- incorporation into London Underground by extending the Bakerloo line from Elephant and Castle
- conversion for tram use as an extension of the Tramlink system
- incorporation into the London Overground via New Cross — problems of line capacity make this a less likely solution.

These schemes have not been taken beyond the proposal stage and recommendations are expected to be published around 2017. In a report published by the London Borough of Bromley in 2012, proposals to extend Tramlink beyond Beckenham Junction into Bromley town centre are outlined, with a further option to continue this route along the Bromley North Line to Grove Park. The report also considers the Bakerloo line extension favourably, but notes difficulties with tunnelling between Lewisham and Grove Park, and with the provision of a depot. The Tramlink proposal also features in the Rail Utilisation Strategy report by Network Rail.

Bromley North Line

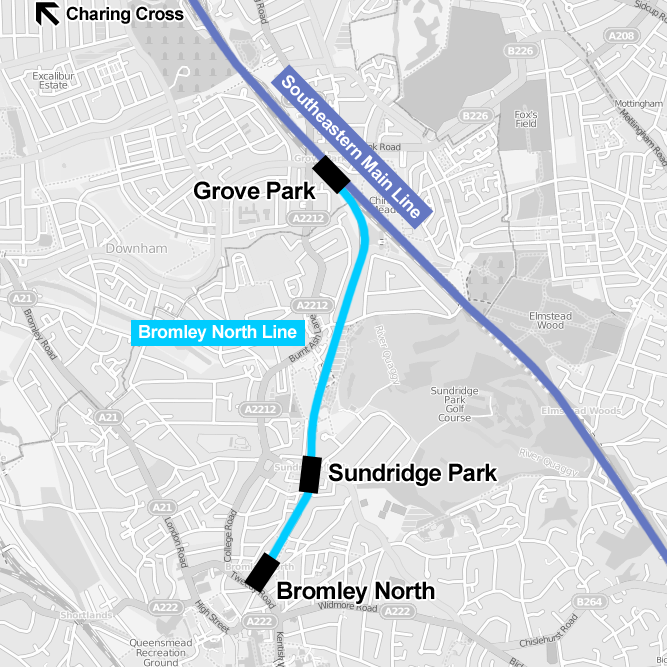
The Bromley North Line in south-east London

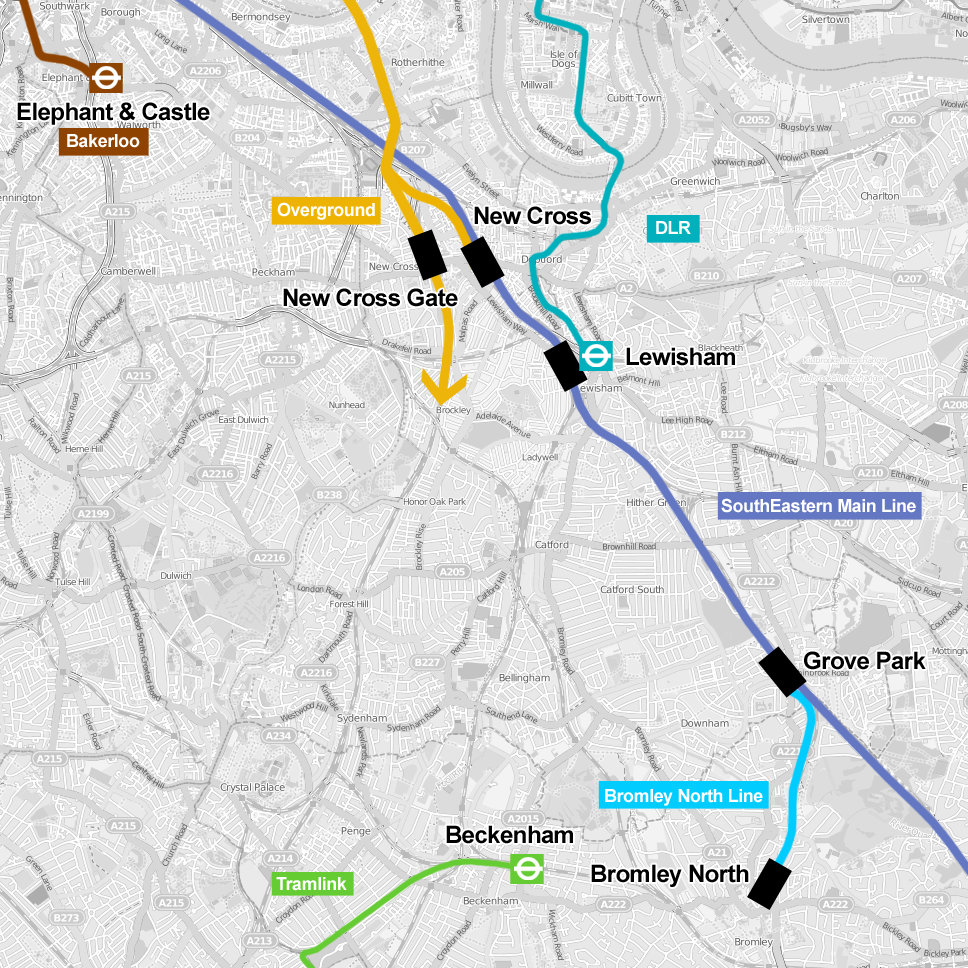
Nearby transport lines which have been proposed to be connected to the Bromley North Line in the future

== Sources ==
- Body, Geoffrey (1989). Railways of the Southern Region. Patrick Stephens. ISBN 1-85260-297-X.
