= St Mary's Church, Bromley =

Church of England parish church

Coordinates: 51.4131°N 0.0150°E

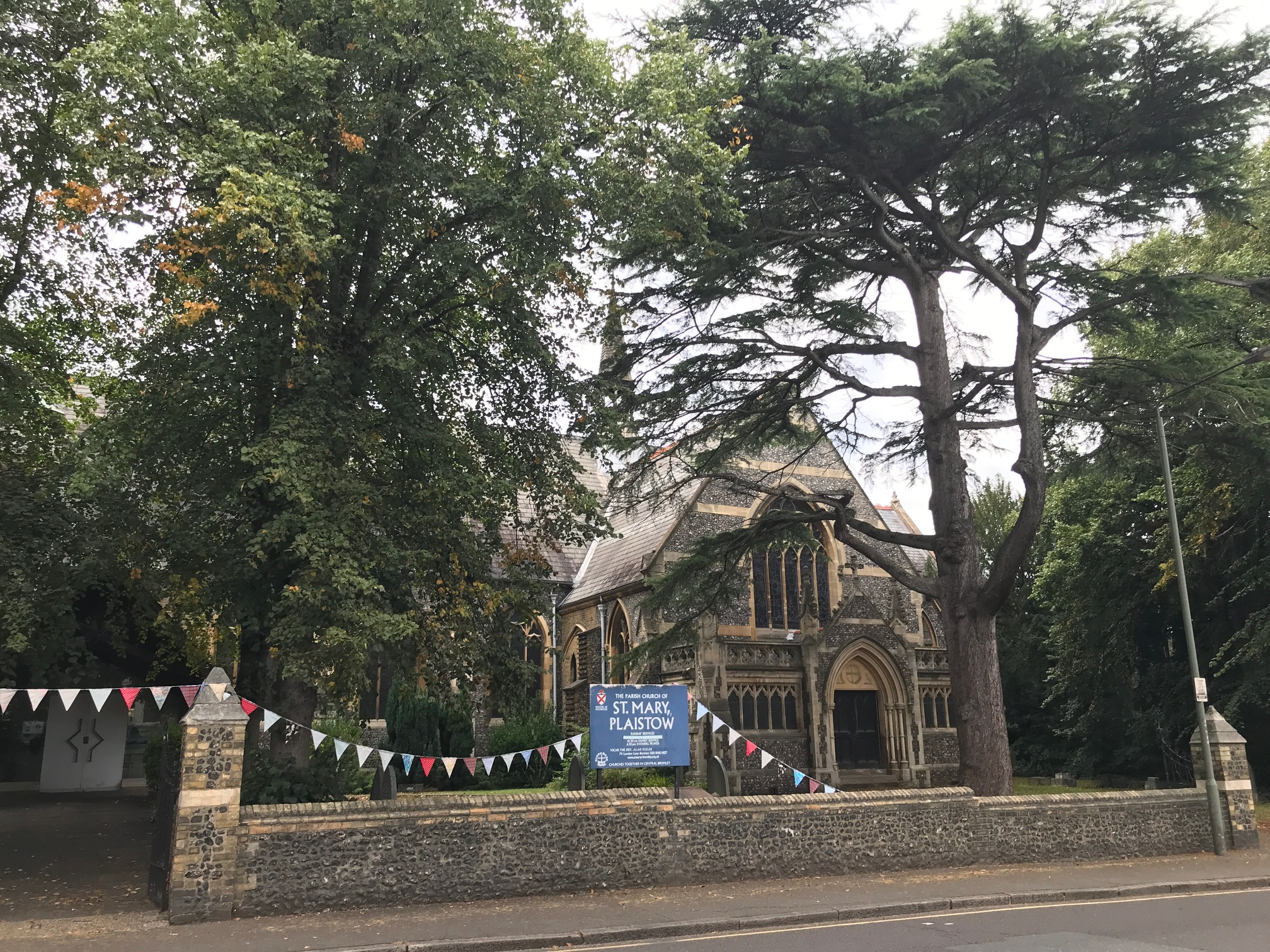
St Mary's Church

St Mary's Church, Bromley is a Church of England parish church in what was the village of Plaistow in Bromley. It was consecrated in 1863 and enlarged three times between 1881 and 1900. Its churchyard closed for burials in 1893 when Plaistow Cemetery opened. In order to avoid confusion with churches of similar names it is sometimes called "St Mary Plaistow, Bromley".
