= Bromley North railway station =

National Rail station in London, England

Bromley North
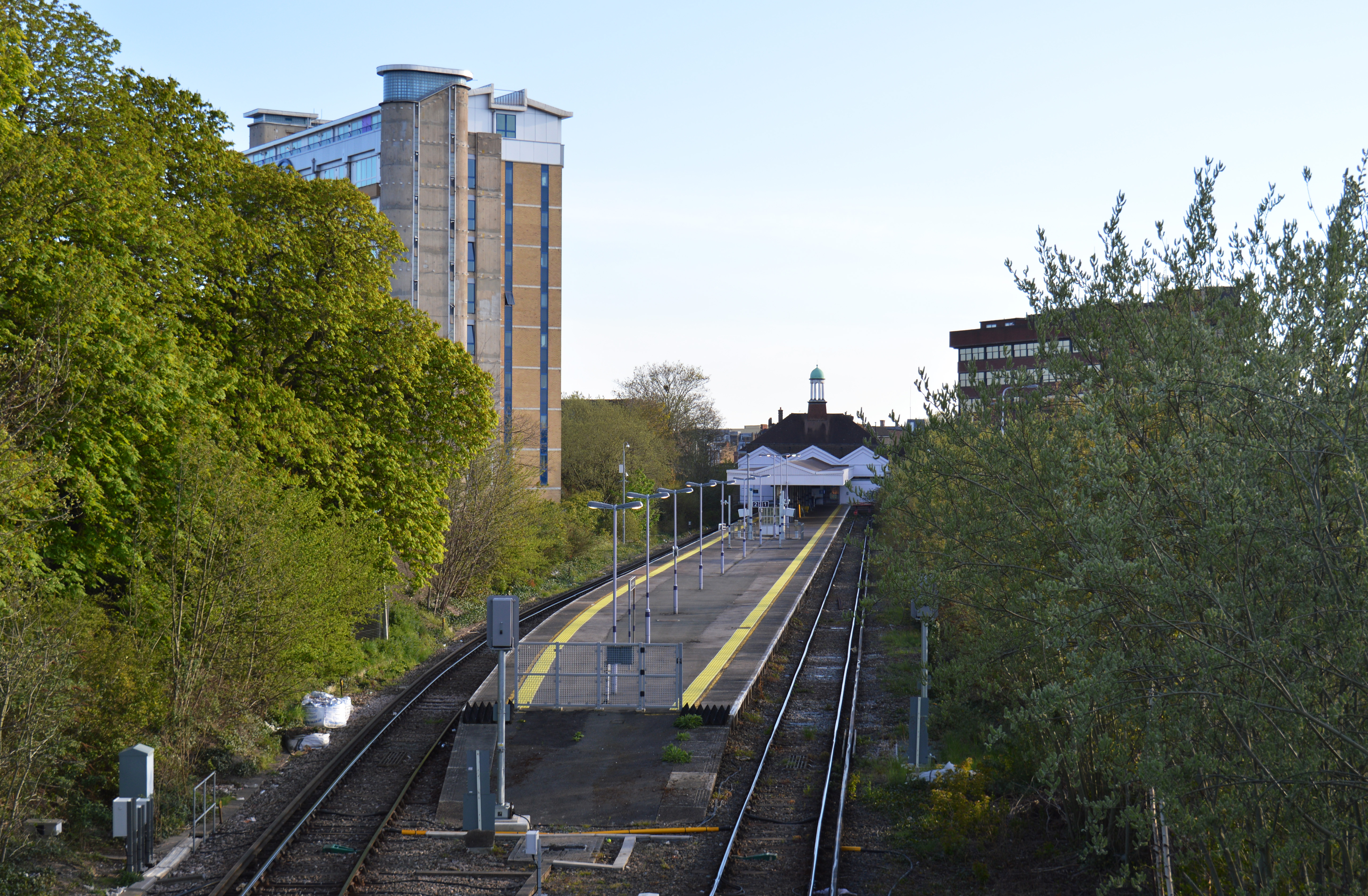
- Interactive map of Bromley North

General information
- Location: Bromley
- Local authority: London Borough of Bromley
- Managed by: Southeastern
- Station code: BMN
- DfT category: D
- Number of platforms: 2
- Accessible: Yes
- Fare zone: 4
- OSI: Bromley South

National Rail annual entry and exit
- 2020–21: ▼63,164
- 2021–22: ▲0.150 million
- 2022–23: ▲0.180 million
- 2023–24: ▲0.202 million
- 2024–25: ▲0.226 million

Key dates
- 1 January 1878: Opened
- 1926: Rebuilt

Listed status
- Listed feature: Bromley North Station
- Listing grade: II
- Entry number: 1186833
- Added to list: 31 August 1990; 36 years ago

Other information
- External links: Departures; Facilities
- Coordinates: 51.4088°N 0.0179°E

Bromley North railway station is in the London Borough of Bromley in south-east London, in London fare zone 4. It is 10 miles 47 chains (17.0 km) down the line from London Charing Cross. The station and all trains serving it are operated by Southeastern. It is the terminus of the short Bromley North Branch Line from Grove Park.

== History ==
The station was opened in 1878. It was extensively rebuilt by the Southern Railway in 1925-1926 by the Chief Architect to the Southern Railway, James Robb Scott.

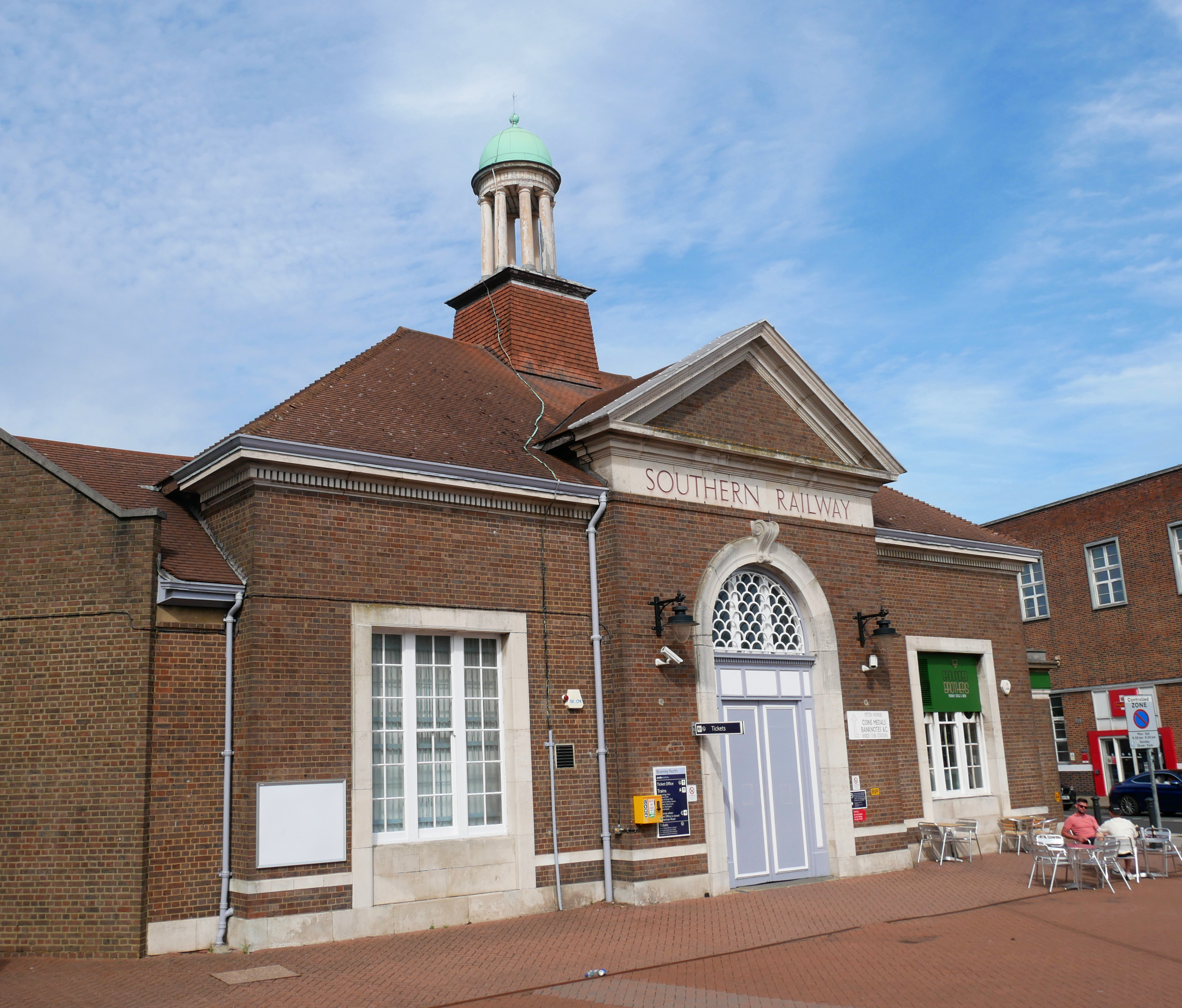
The station entrance on Tweedy Road.

The building has been Grade II listed since 31 August 1990.

== Services ==
=== Historical services ===
After opening the station trains had direct services to Holborn Viaduct, London Victoria, London Bridge, London Cannon Street and London Charing Cross. From April 1976 this was cut back to a peak hour service before being withdrawn completely in 1990. In order to get from Bromley North to Central London passengers have to change at Grove Park.

=== Current services ===
All services at Bromley North are operated by Southeastern using Class 465 EMUs.

The typical off-peak service is two trains per hour to and from Grove Park, from where connections are available to London Charing Cross, London Cannon Street, Orpington and Sevenoaks. The service is increased to three trains per hour during the morning peak.

There is no service at the station on Sundays or public holidays.

Preceding station	National Rail	Following station
Sundridge Park	Southeastern Bromley North Line Monday-Saturday only	Terminus

== Connections ==
Bromley North is a hub terminus for buses in outer southeast London, with 15 day routes (two of which are part of the Superloop express network), one 24-hour route and one night-operating route serving the station, of which 12 of the day routes terminate/commence at Bromley North.

London Buses routes 61, 119, 126, 138, 146, 227, 246, 261, 269, 314, 336, 352, 354, 367, SL3, SL5 and night route N3 serve the station.

== Future proposals ==
Proposals have been put forward by Transport for London and the London Borough of Bromley for the Bromley North Line to be extended and connected to either the Docklands Light Railway via a link south of Lewisham, to the Tramlink system from Beckenham Junction, or to an extension of the Bakerloo line from Elephant & Castle. These schemes have not been taken beyond the proposal stage and recommendations were expected to be published around 2018.

Additionally, it has been suggested that the Bromley North Line could be connected to London Overground via an extended service from New Cross, although the problems of line capacity make this seem an unlikely solution.

Bromley North Line

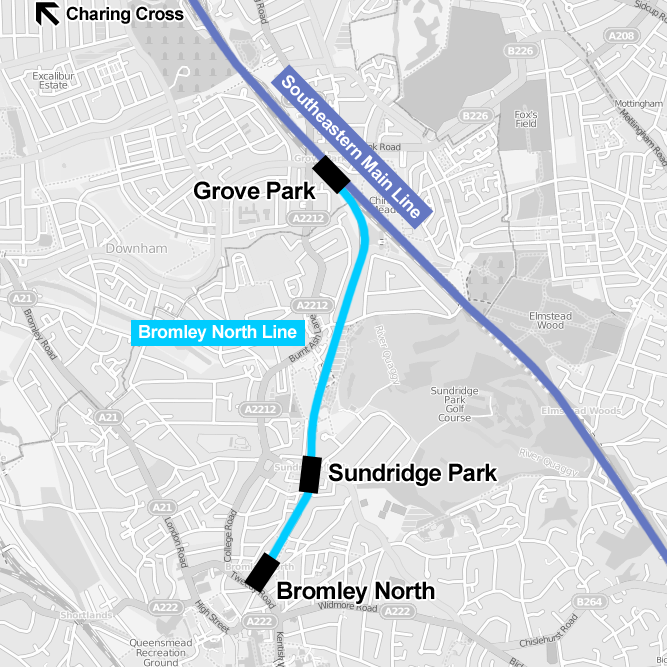
The Bromley North Line in south-east London

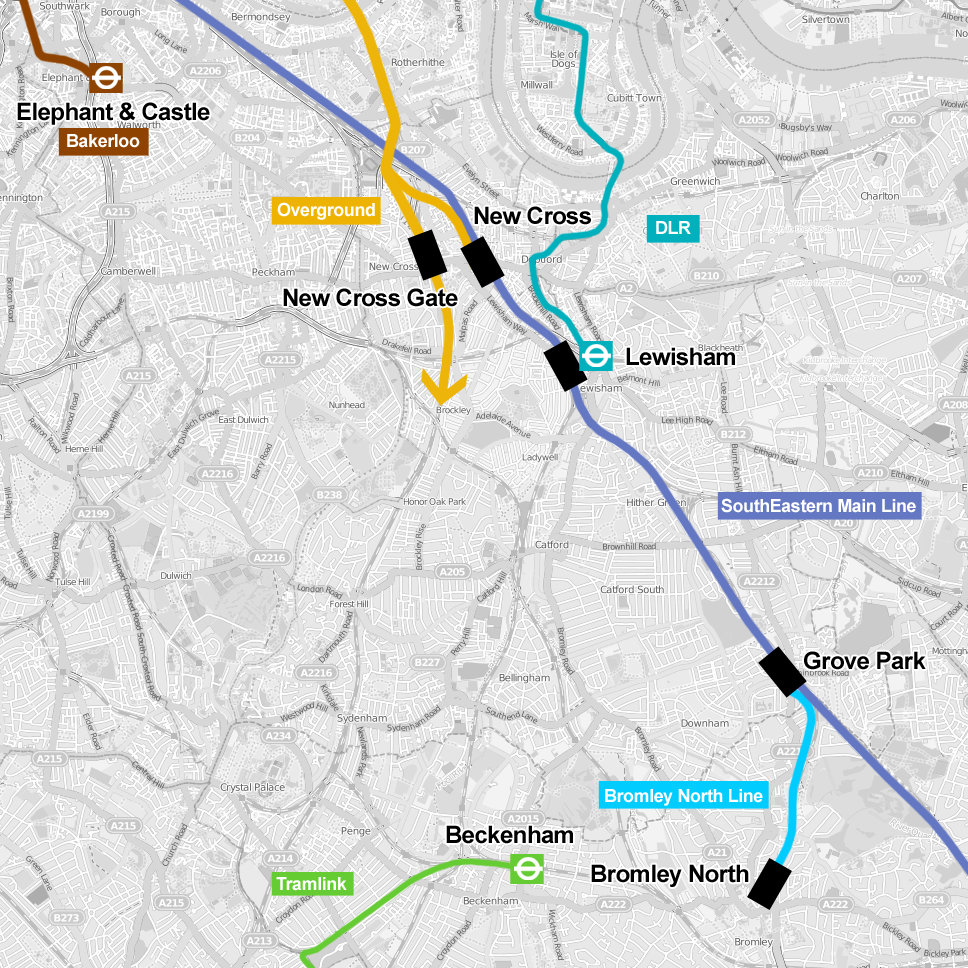
Nearby transport lines which have been proposed to be connected to the Bromley North Line in the future

== See also ==
- Bromley South railway station, the main station in Bromley.
