= Sundridge Park Mansion, London =

Building in Bromley, Greater London, England

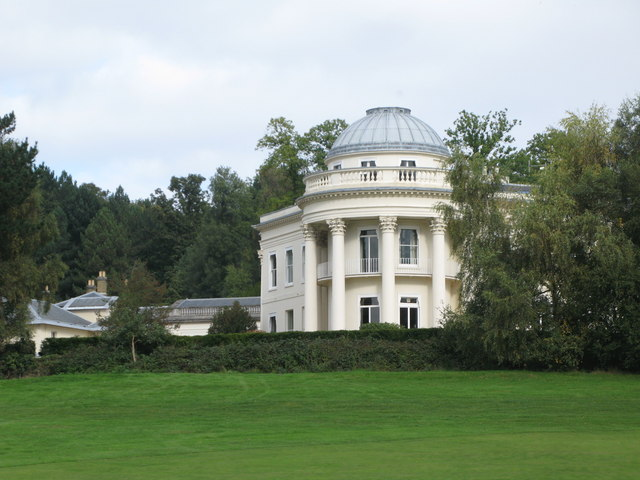
Sundridge Park Mansion

Sundridge Park Mansion in Bromley, near London is a Grade I building on the English Heritage List. It was built in about 1797 for Sir Claude Scott by the famous architect John Nash. It was the home of the Scott family for the next 120 years until 1920 when it was sold. It became a luxury hotel and later a training centre. Today it is a mansion which contains 22 apartments.

== Owners and residents ==
Sir Claude Scott (1742-1830) was a corn merchant and later became a banker and member of parliament. He amassed his wealth by assisting the government to make astute purchases of corn from foreign countries in times of scarcity in England. In 1767 he married Martha Eyre, the daughter of John Eyre of Stepney.

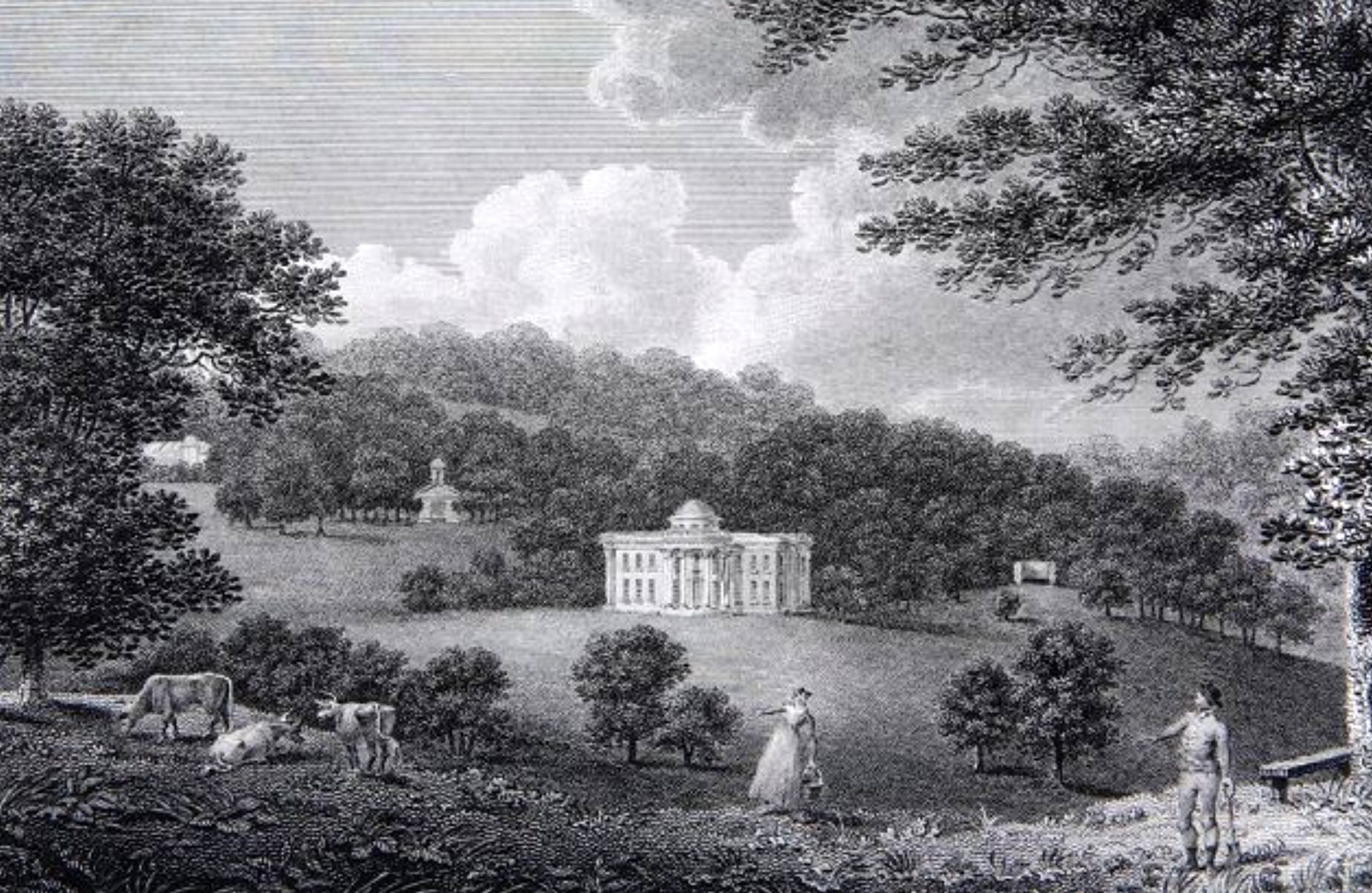
Engraving of Sundridge Park Mansion 1804

In 1797 he bought the Sundridge Park Estate and demolished the existing house. He appointed John Nash to build the new structure which still exists today. In his new home he became a collector of books and paintings. He was a Governor of the British Institution for the Promotion of the Fine Arts in England. He also had a huge collection of books which were listed in a catalogue after his death. In 1804 an engraving of his new house was made by William Angus which is shown.

In 1821 he bought the Lychett Estate in Dorset and he and his wife moved there to live. His son Sir Samuel Scott (1772-1849) moved into Sundridge Park and later inherited it when Claude died in 1830. Sir Samuel Scott was a member of Parliament and a banker. In 1796 he married Anne Ommanney the daughter and sole heiress of Edward Ommanney of Bloomsbury Square. The couple had two sons and two daughters. When Samuel died in 1849 Sundridge Park was inherited by his younger son Samuel Scott

Samuel Scott (1807-1869) was a major partner in the family banking firm Sir S. Scott and Co., London. He did not marry and lived alone at Sundridge Park. The 1851 Census records him living at the house with a butler, 2 footmen, a housekeeper, 3 housemaids and 2 kitchenmaids. He amassed a large fortune and when he died in 1869 he had 1.5 million pounds (230 million today). Because he had no children he left the bulk of his estate including Sundridge Park to his nephew Edward Henry Scott.

Sir Edward Henry Scott (1842-1883) was the son of Sir Claude Edward Scott, 3rd Baronet (1804–1874). In 1865 he married Emilie Packe (1840-1922) and the couple had two daughters and one son. Edward made extensive additions to the house. He bred pheasants on the estate and organised shooting parties. A frequent guest on these occasions was the then Prince of Wales, later to become Edward VII. He also held musical afternoons at Sunridge Park which the Prince attended.

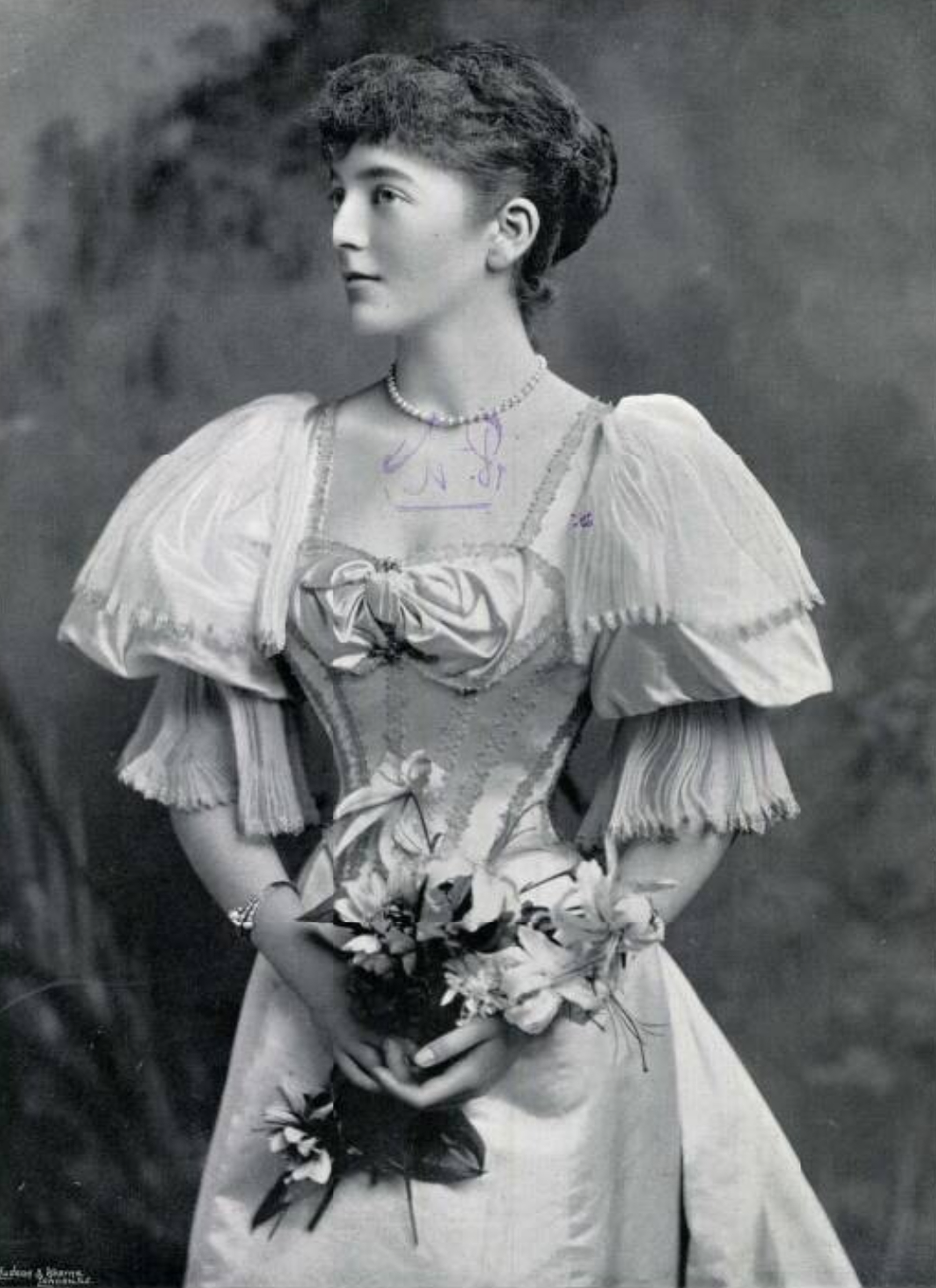
Lady Sophie Scott in 1897

When Edward died in 1883 his son Sir Samuel Scott, 6th Baronet (1873-1943) became the owner of Sundridge Park. He took possession of it when he came of age in 1894. In 1896 he married Sophie Cadogan (1874-1937), daughter of Sir George Henry Cadogan, 5th Earl of Cadogan. Their wedding was widely reported in the English and international newspapers and was attended by the Prince and Princess of Wales and the Duke and Duchess of York.

Lady Sophie Scott was a socialite. One magazine published when her father was Lord Lieutenant of Ireland described her in the following terms.

"Lady Sophie Scott, the younger daughter of Lord Cadogan is familiarly known in the Irish capital as “the princess”. During last season she was the centre of attractions at all the viceregal functions and her mother’s constant companion in her many and arduous duties. Yet she found time to be seen twice a week in the hunting field where she rode with the enthusiasm characteristic of the Cadogan family."

Sir Samuel Edward Scott was in the military for many years and served in the Boer War in 1900. He was also a member of parliament for twenty years. In 1901 he leased a large part of the grounds and the Sundridge Park Golf Club was formed. Sir Samuel was appointed as President. The house was leased as an hotel, the owners of the hotel eventually purchasing the freehold in 1920.
