= Elmstead Woods railway station =

National Rail station in London, England

Elmstead Woods
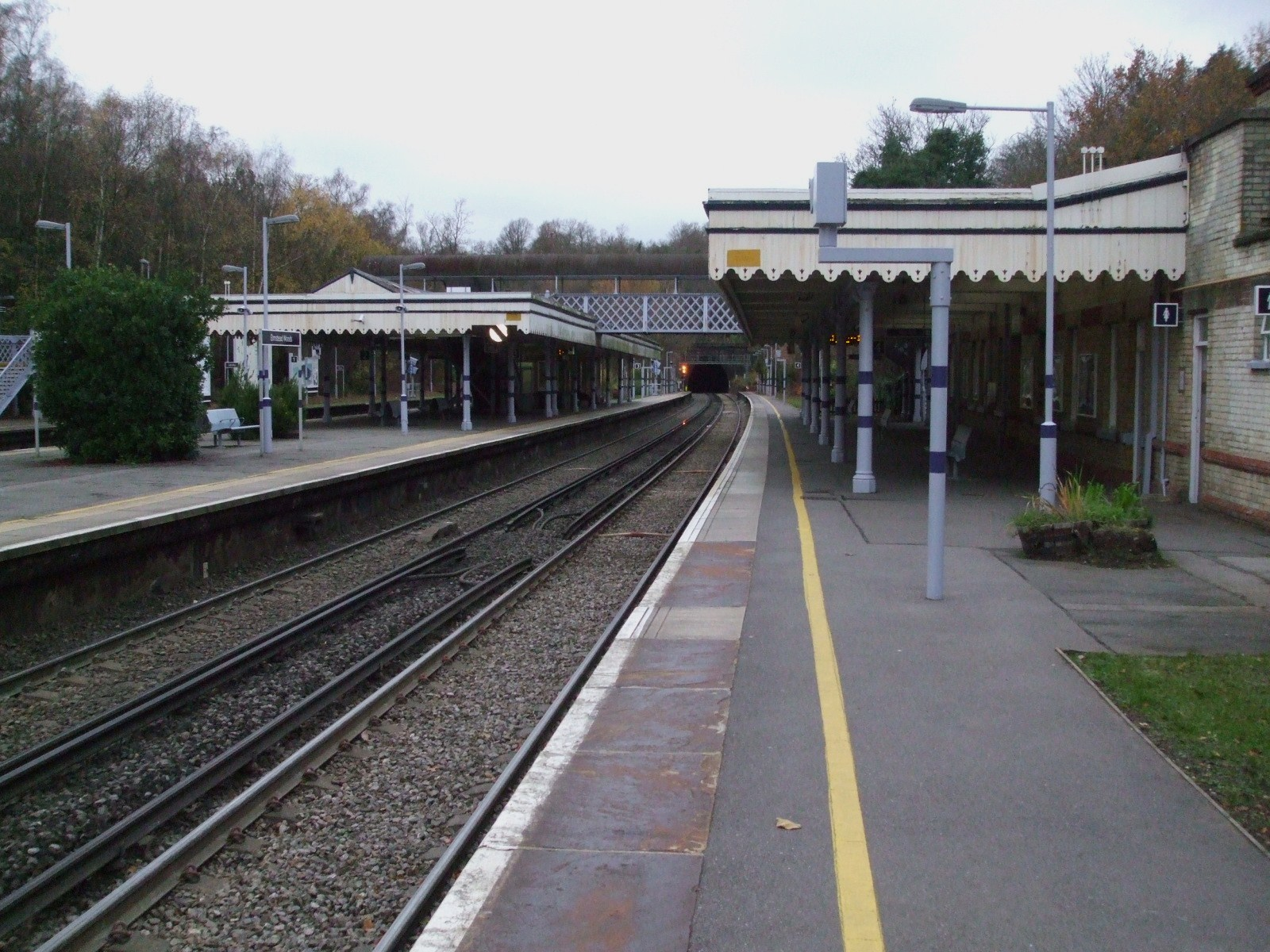
- Interactive map of Elmstead Woods

General information
- Location: Elmstead
- Local authority: London Borough of Bromley
- Managed by: Southeastern
- Station code: ESD
- DfT category: D
- Number of platforms: 4
- Fare zone: 4

National Rail annual entry and exit
- 2020–21: ▼0.242 million
- 2021–22: ▲0.608 million
- 2022–23: ▲0.781 million
- 2023–24: ▲0.868 million
- 2024–25: ▲0.927 million

Key dates
- 1 July 1904: Opened as Elmstead
- 1 October 1908: renamed Elmstead Woods

Other information
- External links: Departures; Facilities
- Coordinates: 51.4168°N 0.0441°E

Elmstead Woods railway station is on the South Eastern Main Line, serving the district of Elmstead in the London Borough of Bromley. It is 10 miles 21 chains (16.5 km) down the line from Charing Cross and is situated between Grove Park and Chislehurst stations.

It is in London fare zone 4, and the station and all trains are operated by Southeastern.

The station is named after Elmstead Wood.

== Services ==
All services at Elmstead Woods are operated by Southeastern using Class 376, 465, 466 and 707 EMUs.

The typical off-peak service in trains per hour is:

- 2 tph to London Charing Cross (non-stop from Lewisham to London Bridge)
- 2 tph to London Cannon Street (all stations except Lewisham)
- 4 tph to Orpington of which 2 continue to Sevenoaks

On Sundays, the station is served by a half-hourly service between Sevenoaks and London Charing Cross via Lewisham.

Preceding station	National Rail	Following station
Grove Park	Southeastern Grove Park Line	Chislehurst

== Connections ==
London Buses route 314 serve the station.
