= Grade I and II* listed buildings in the Royal Borough of Greenwich =

There are over 9,000 Grade I listed buildings and 20,000 Grade II* listed buildings in England. This page is a list of these buildings in the Royal Borough of Greenwich.

== Grade I ==
Name	Location	Type	Completed (Note: The date given is the date used by Historic England as significant for the initial building or that of an important part in the structure's description.)	Date designated	Grid ref. (Note: The grid reference is based on the British national grid reference system, sometimes known as OSGB36, used by the Ordnance Survey.) Geo-coordinates	Entry number (Note: The "List Entry Number" is a unique number assigned to each listed building and scheduled monument by Historic England.)	Image
Charlton House	Charlton	Community Centre	At present	19 October 1951	TQ4155977692; 51°28′50″N 0°02′14″E	1218593	Charlton House More images
Garden house at Charlton House	Charlton	Garden House	Mid-late 17th century	19 October 1951	TQ4148477773; 51°28′52″N 0°02′10″E	1291892	Garden house at Charlton House More images
Charlton House Gateway	Charlton	Gate	Late 17th century	19 October 1951	TQ4148877701; 51°28′50″N 0°02′10″E	1358935	Charlton House Gateway More images
Charlton House Stables	Charlton	Stable	17th century	19 October 1951	TQ4155677635; 51°28′48″N 0°02′14″E	1079066	Charlton House Stables More images
Church of St Alfege	Greenwich	Church	1711–14	19 October 1951	TQ3830677605; 51°28′50″N 0°00′35″W	1358970	Church of St Alfege More images
Eltham Palace Great Hall	Eltham	Great Hall	c. 1479	8 June 1973	TQ4241173987; 51°26′49″N 0°02′53″E	1079041	Eltham Palace Great Hall More images
Eltham Palace North Boundary Wall, Entrance Gateway and Spur Wall with Gateway	Eltham	Gate	Early 16th century	8 June 1973	TQ4261174106; 51°26′53″N 0°03′03″E	1211999	Eltham Palace North Boundary Wall, Entrance Gateway and Spur Wall with Gateway More images
Eltham Palace, Walls of Inner Courtyard with adjoining Chambers	Eltham	Bishops Palace	c. 1300	8 June 1973	TQ4242874058; 51°26′51″N 0°02′54″E	1218900	Eltham Palace, Walls of Inner Courtyard with adjoining Chambers More images
Eltham Palace South Moat Bridge	Eltham	Bridge	16th century	8 June 1973	TQ4240673939; 51°26′48″N 0°02′52″E	1358958	Eltham Palace South Moat Bridge More images
Eltham Palace North Moat Bridge	Eltham	Bridge	Late 15th century	8 June 1973	TQ4246174050; 51°26′51″N 0°02′55″E	1218925	Eltham Palace North Moat Bridge More images
Eltham Lodge	Eltham	Steps	1663–65	8 June 1973	TQ4293473831; 51°26′44″N 0°03′19″E	1358953	Eltham Lodge
Morden College	Greenwich	Sundial	1695	19 October 1951	TQ4036776436; 51°28′10″N 0°01′10″E	1289879	Morden College More images
National Maritime Museum	Greenwich	House	1616–1637	8 June 1973	TQ3871177697; 51°28′52″N 0°00′14″W	1211481	National Maritime Museum More images
Numbers 1 to 14 (consecutive): The Paragon, and Paragon Cottage and Paragon Lodge	Blackheath	Apartment	Since the war	19 October 1951	TQ3996676408; 51°28′10″N 0°00′49″E	1211997	Numbers 1 to 14 (consecutive): The Paragon, and Paragon Cottage and Paragon Lodge More images
Royal Arsenal, Royal Brass Foundry	Woolwich	Workshop	1716–1717	8 June 1973	TQ4373779063; 51°29′32″N 0°04′09″E	1078956	Royal Arsenal, Royal Brass Foundry More images
Royal Naval College, Gates, Gate Piers and Lodges to West Entrance	Greenwich	Gate		8 June 1973	TQ3836677798; 51°28′56″N 0°00′32″W	1078973	Royal Naval College, Gates, Gate Piers and Lodges to West Entrance More images
Royal Naval College, North East Building: Queen Anne's Quarter	Greenwich	Naval College	1699	8 June 1973	TQ3862878007; 51°29′03″N 0°00′18″W	1290044	Royal Naval College, North East Building: Queen Anne's Quarter More images
Royal Naval College, North West Building: King Charles Quarters	Greenwich	Pavilion	1712	8 June 1973	TQ3848877924; 51°29′00″N 0°00′25″W	1211337	Royal Naval College, North West Building: King Charles Quarters More images
Royal Naval College, Queen Mary's Quarter	Greenwich	Colonnade	1699	8 June 1973	TQ3867777909; 51°28′59″N 0°00′15″W	1211384	Royal Naval College, Queen Mary's Quarter More images
Royal Naval College, South West Building King William's Quarter	Greenwich	Colonnade	1703	8 June 1973	TQ3858977860; 51°28′58″N 0°00′20″W	1211426	Royal Naval College, South West Building King William's Quarter More images
Royal Naval College, Gate lodges at East Gate	Greenwich	Lodge		8 June 1973	TQ3869377970; 51°29′01″N 0°00′14″W	1358993	Royal Naval College, Gate lodges at East Gate More images
Royal Observatory, Flamsteed House	Greenwich Park, Greenwich	Pavilion	18th century	8 June 1973	TQ3884777335; 51°28′41″N 0°00′07″W	1358976	Royal Observatory, Flamsteed House More images
Royal Observatory, Former Great Equatorial Building	Greenwich Park, Greenwich	Observatory	Mid 19th century	8 June 1973	TQ3890677312; 51°28′40″N 0°00′04″W	1078998	Royal Observatory, Former Great Equatorial Building More images
Royal Observatory, the Transit House	Greenwich Park, Greenwich	House	17th century	8 June 1973	TQ3888877321; 51°28′40″N 0°00′05″W	1220877	Royal Observatory, the Transit House More images
Royal Observatory, Wall and Clock to Right of Entrance Gates	Greenwich Park, Greenwich	Wall		8 June 1973	TQ3888577339; 51°28′41″N 0°00′05″W	1220888	Royal Observatory, Wall and Clock to Right of Entrance Gates More images
Cutty Sark	Greenwich	Museum	By 1973	8 June 1973	TQ3830577866; 51°28′58″N 0°00′35″W	1079013	Cutty Sark More images
Ranger's House	Greenwich	House	c. 1690	19 October 1951	TQ3888776832; 51°28′24″N 0°00′06″W	1218679	Ranger's House More images
Vanbrugh Castle	Maze Hill, Greenwich	House	1717	19 October 1951	TQ3930877620; 51°28′49″N 0°00′17″E	1078943	Vanbrugh Castle More images

== Grade II* ==
Name	Location	Type	Completed	Date designated	Grid ref. Geo-coordinates	Entry number	Image
Charnel House to Church of St Nicholas	Greenwich	Charnel House	1697	19 October 1951	TQ3739777722; 51°28′54″N 0°01′22″W	1289734	Charnel House to Church of St Nicholas More images
Church of St Luke	Charlton	Church	Earlier church	19 October 1951	TQ4145777835; 51°28′54″N 0°02′09″E	1358934	Church of St Luke More images
Church of St Mary Magdalene	Woolwich	Church	1727–1739	26 March 1954	TQ4306879124; 51°29′35″N 0°03′34″E	1358969	Church of St Mary Magdalene More images
Church of St Michael and All Angels	Blackheath	Church	1828–1830	8 June 1973	TQ3996975896; 51°27′53″N 0°00′49″E	1079055	Church of St Michael and All Angels More images
Church of St Nicholas	Greenwich	Church	13th century	19 October 1951	TQ3739677745; 51°28′55″N 0°01′22″W	1358943	Church of St Nicholas More images
Church of St Nicholas (Plumstead)	Plumstead	Church	Medieval	26 March 1954	TQ4593178545; 51°29′13″N 0°06′02″E	1211745	Church of St Nicholas (Plumstead) More images
Cliefden House	Eltham	House	Early 18th century	26 March 1954	TQ4282374437; 51°27′03″N 0°03′15″E	1358945	Cliefden House More images
Eltham Court (Eltham Palace)	Eltham	Royal Palace	Medieval	6 July 1981	TQ4245874010; 51°26′50″N 0°02′55″E	1212906	Eltham Court (Eltham Palace)
Garden Wall to South of Moat of Well Hall Art Gallery	Eltham	Garden Wall		26 March 1954	TQ4244475071; 51°27′24″N 0°02′56″E	1212111	Garden Wall to South of Moat of Well Hall Art Gallery More images
Granada Cinema	Woolwich	Cinema	1936–1937	31 December 1973	TQ4323679160; 51°29′36″N 0°03′43″E	1212651	Granada Cinema More images
Main Building, Royal Military Academy	Woolwich	Barracks	1805–1808	8 June 1973	TQ4307877208; 51°28′33″N 0°03′32″E	1358936	Main Building, Royal Military Academy More images
Manna Mead	Greenwich	House	c. 1800	19 October 1951	TQ3844176812; 51°28′24″N 0°00′29″W	1212237	Manna Mead More images
Moat and Bridge to South of Well Hall Art Gallery	Eltham	Moat	16th century	26 March 1954	TQ4243975110; 51°27′25″N 0°02′56″E	1212110	Moat and Bridge to South of Well Hall Art Gallery More images
North and East Walls to Churchyard of St Nicholas and Gate Piers on West Wall	Deptford	Gate Pier	1697	8 June 1973	TQ3740077772; 51°28′56″N 0°01′22″W	1219793	North and East Walls to Churchyard of St Nicholas and Gate Piers on West Wall More images
North Boundary Wall of No. 20 Court Road	Eltham	Boundary Wall	Early 16th century	8 June 1973	TQ4265174110; 51°26′53″N 0°03′05″E	1291771	North Boundary Wall of No. 20 Court Road
No. 32 and 32A Court Yard	Eltham	Building	Late 16th century	8 June 1973	TQ4248474112; 51°26′53″N 0°02′56″E	1079040	No. 32 and 32A Court Yard
No. 47 and 49 Maze Hill	Greenwich	House	Early 18th century	5 April 1954	TQ3916377773; 51°28′54″N 0°00′10″E	1078940	No. 47 and 49 Maze Hill More images
No. 20 Blackheath Park	Blackheath	Detached House	1957–1958	29 March 1988	TQ3998875844; 51°27′51″N 0°00′50″E	1213442	No. 20 Blackheath Park
No. 34, 36 and 38 Court Yard	Eltham	Timber Framed Building	16th century	8 June 1973	TQ4247574106; 51°26′53″N 0°02′56″E	1218878	No. 34, 36 and 38 Court Yard
No. 6, 8, 10 and 12 Including Forecourt Piers in Front and Walls	Greenwich	Terrace	Early 18th century	19 October 1951	TQ3841977454; 51°28′45″N 0°00′29″W	1218993	No. 6, 8, 10 and 12 Including Forecourt Piers in Front and Walls More images
No. 85-91 Genesta Road and Attached Walls Gates and Gatepiers	Woolwich	Garage	1933	12 October 1978	TQ4418277570; 51°28′43″N 0°04′29″E	1247069	No. 85-91 Genesta Road and Attached Walls Gates and Gatepiers More images
Old brick wall between gardens in front of No. 34 and 36 Court Yard and along road frontage of these houses	Eltham	Wall	16th century	8 June 1973	TQ4248174090; 51°26′52″N 0°02′56″E	1358957	Old brick wall between gardens in front of No. 34 and 36 Court Yard and along road frontage of these houses
Orangery to former Eltham House, now at north end of grounds of No. 113 Eltham High Street	Eltham	Orangery	Late 17th century	26 March 1954	TQ4284074575; 51°27′08″N 0°03′16″E	1079017	Orangery to former Eltham House, now at north end of grounds of No. 113 Eltham High Street
Outer Courtyard Walls to West and South of Vanbrugh Castle	Maze Hill, Greenwich	Gate Pier	Early 18th century	8 June 1973	TQ3930977582; 51°28′48″N 0°00′17″E	1078944	Outer Courtyard Walls to West and South of Vanbrugh Castle More images
Paragon House	Blackheath	House	Late 18th century	19 October 1951	TQ3990676436; 51°28′11″N 0°00′46″E	1289733	Paragon House More images
Point House	Greenwich	House	1701	8 June 1973	TQ3841976821; 51°28′24″N 0°00′30″W	1289615	Point House More images
Royal Arsenal, Dial Square Entrance Range	Woolwich	Gate	1717–1720	8 June 1973	TQ4379479093; 51°29′33″N 0°04′12″E	1211005	Royal Arsenal, Dial Square Entrance Range More images
Royal Arsenal, Board Room (Old Royal Military Academy)	Woolwich	Pattern Shop	After 1806	8 June 1973	TQ4371279266; 51°29′39″N 0°04′08″E	1359015	Royal Arsenal, Board Room (Old Royal Military Academy) More images
Royal Arsenal, the Grand Store (West and South Ranges: Buildings 36 37 and 46; E Range: building 49)	Woolwich	Arsenal	1808–1813	8 June 1973	TQ4404979312; 51°29′40″N 0°04′25″E	1078958	Royal Arsenal, the Grand Store (West and South Ranges: Buildings 36 37 and 46; E Range: building 49) More images
Royal Artillery Barracks, Main Building	Woolwich	Barracks	1775–1782	8 June 1973	TQ4310478322; 51°29′09″N 0°03′35″E	1078918	Royal Artillery Barracks, Main Building More images
Severndroog Castle	Castle Wood Park, Shooter's Hill	House	1784	26 March 1954	TQ4319076196; 51°28′00″N 0°03′36″E	1289792	Severndroog Castle More images
Stretch of Old Wall Running East from South East Angle of Gate House Garden	Eltham	Wall	16th century	8 June 1973	TQ4260773996; 51°26′49″N 0°03′03″E	1218860	Stretch of Old Wall Running East from South East Angle of Gate House Garden
The Borough Hall and Meridian House	Greenwich		1939	13 November 1990	TQ 38235 77334	1213855	The Borough Hall and Meridian House More images
The Manor House	Eltham	House	1695	19 October 1951	TQ3864877075; 51°28′32″N 0°00′18″W	1358942	The Manor House
The Presbytery	Greenwich	Priests House	c. 1630	19 October 1951	TQ3857477170; 51°28′35″N 0°00′22″W	1079011	The Presbytery More images
The Rotunda	Woolwich	Garden Building	1814	8 June 1973	TQ4265078139; 51°29′03″N 0°03′11″E	1078987	The Rotunda More images
The Standard Reservoir Conduit House	Greenwich Park, Greenwich	Conduit House	Late 17th century or early 18th century	25 September 2009	TQ3863277246; 51°28′38″N 0°00′19″W	1393455	The Standard Reservoir Conduit House More images
The Woodlands	Westcombe Park	House	1772	19 October 1951	TQ4011277556; 51°28′47″N 0°00′59″E	1078946	The Woodlands More images
Trinity Hospital	Greenwich	Courtyard	1613–1617	19 October 1951	TQ3882978150; 51°29′07″N 0°00′07″W	1078961	Trinity Hospital More images
Wall along frontage of No. 32 and 32a Court Yard, and along north boundary of garden from front to rear	Eltham	Wall	16th century	8 June 1973	TQ4249474139; 51°26′54″N 0°02′57″E	1079039	Wall along frontage of No. 32 and 32a Court Yard, and along north boundary of garden from front to rear
Wall running 187 yards along west side of road from north east corner of No. 1 Court Yard to north east corner of Bramber House	Eltham	Wall	16th century	8 June 1973	TQ4261774231; 51°26′57″N 0°03′04″E	1358956	Wall running 187 yards along west side of road from north east corner of No. 1 Court Yard to north east corner of Bramber House More images
Walls Surrounding Garden of the Gate House	Eltham	Gate Pier	Late 17th century	8 June 1973	TQ4251974077; 51°26′52″N 0°02′58″E	1079038	Walls Surrounding Garden of the Gate House
Walls to North of Front Garden of Bramber House and Along Road Front	Eltham	Wall	16th century	8 June 1973	TQ4252974111; 51°26′53″N 0°02′59″E	1291744	Walls to North of Front Garden of Bramber House and Along Road Front
Well Hall Art Gallery	Eltham	Restaurant	1936	26 March 1954	TQ4245675107; 51°27′25″N 0°02′56″E	1289673	Well Hall Art Gallery More images
Woolwich Town Hall	Woolwich	Town Hall	1902–1906	8 June 1973	TQ4345278739; 51°29′22″N 0°03′53″E	1289668	Woolwich Town Hall More images
