= Shrewsbury Park =

Public park in London, England

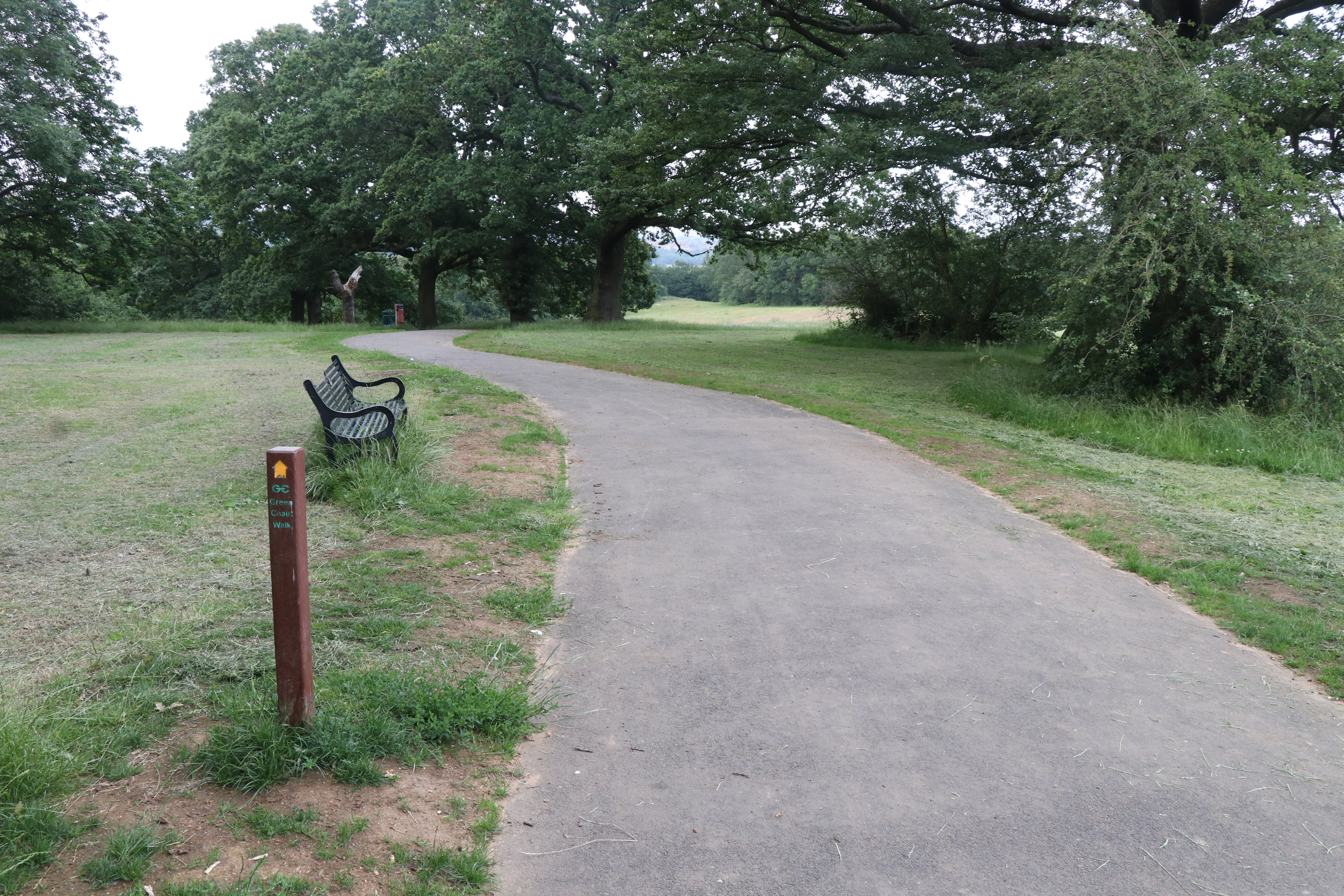
- Shrewsbury Park path, with Green Chain Walk marker post

- Location within Royal Borough of Greenwich
- Type: Public park
- Location: London, SE18
- Coordinates: 51°28′29″N 0°04′43″E
- Area: 13.8 hectares (34 acres)
- Created: 1928
- Operator: Greenwich London Borough Council
- Website: "Shrewsbury Park" (descriptive page on Shrewsbury Park at greenwich.gov.uk, the Greenwich London Borough Council's official website)

Shrewsbury Park is a public park situated on Shooter's Hill, south of Woolwich, in the Royal Borough of Greenwich in south east London.

The park is east of Plum Lane, and north of the Shooter's Hill golf course. It takes its name from the earls of Shrewsbury; the land was formerly part of the Shrewsbury estates, and Shrewsbury House (a library and community centre built in 1923 - replacing an earlier mansion built by the 15th Earl) is nearby. The house's grounds were leased for a London County Council Open Air School from 1908 and in 1928 the LCC purchased part of the grounds for public open space, which became Shrewsbury Park.

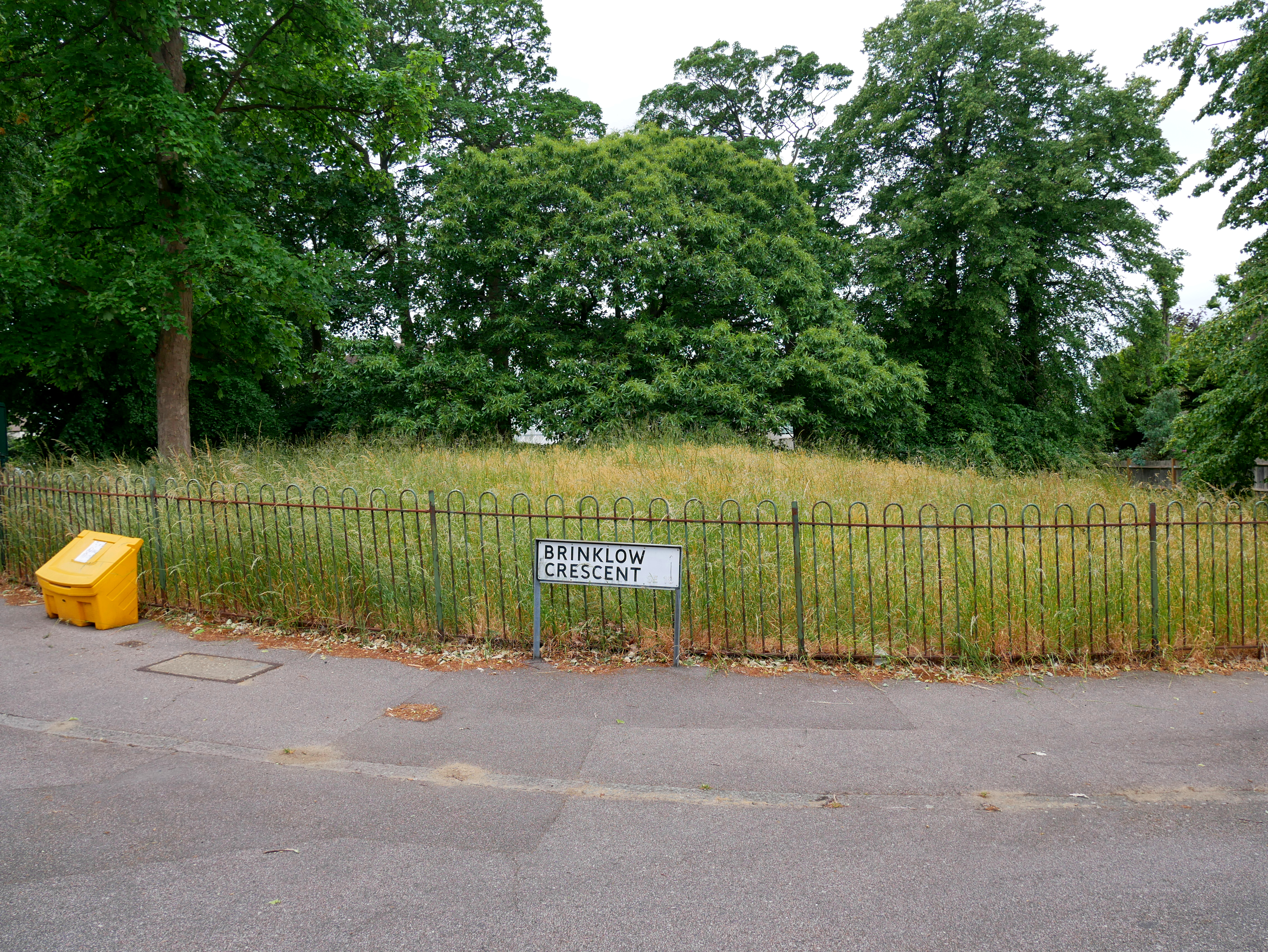
The Shrewsbury Barrow, the only surviving Bronze Age burial mound on Shooter's Hill

Just outside the park is the Shrewsbury Barrow or tumulus, the remains of a Bronze Age burial mound.

During World War II the park was the site of a barrage balloon, part of the Air Ministry's Field Scheme Nosecap for the defence of London; during the Battle of Britain it was manned by 901 County of London Barrage Balloon Squadron, based at nearby RAF Kidbrooke.

Parts of the park are designated as conservation areas. The Green Chain Walk passes through the park.

Shrewsbury Park includes meadows and areas of woodland, and is popular with dog walkers and joggers. The Friends of Shrewsbury Park, established in 2006, organises various events and manages volunteer park maintenance get-togethers. Projects have included installation of a drinking water fountain.

North of the park is Dot Hill, a former allotment site that has now reverted to grassland and scrub, or 'emergent woodland'. A small stream runs at the eastern end.
