= Shooters Hill Sixth Form College =

Location
- Red Lion Lane; Shooter's Hill, London, SE18 4LD; England

Information
- Type: Academy 16-19 Converter
- Established: 2002
- Local authority: Greenwich
- Department for Education URN: 138966 Tables
- Ofsted: Reports
- Head teacher: Janet Atkinson
- Gender: Coeducational
- Age: 16 to 19
- Enrolment: 1500
- Website: http://www.shc.ac.uk/

Shooters Hill Sixth Form College is a large mixed further education college for students aged 16–19, located in Shooter's Hill in the Royal Borough of Greenwich, London, England.

== History ==
The college opened in 2002, and occupies some buildings previously used for secondary school education since 1928.

The school was initially Woolwich County School (created when Woolwich Polytechnic Boys Secondary School, a secondary school established alongside Woolwich Polytechnic in 1897, and split into two sites in 1928; the other is now Woolwich Polytechnic School for Boys), and later (1935) became Shooter's Hill Grammar School. This amalgamated with Bloomfield Road School (Woolwich Secondary School for Boys) in 1973 and reopened as Eaglesfield Secondary School in November 1978, becoming a sixth form campus in 2002.

It is a member of the Sixth Form Colleges' Association.

== Notable alumni ==
=== Woolwich County School ===
- Tommy Flowers MBE, who designed and built the WWII Colossus computer at the Post Office Research Station
- Prince Littler CBE and Emile Littler, both theatrical impresarios

=== Shooter's Hill Grammar School ===
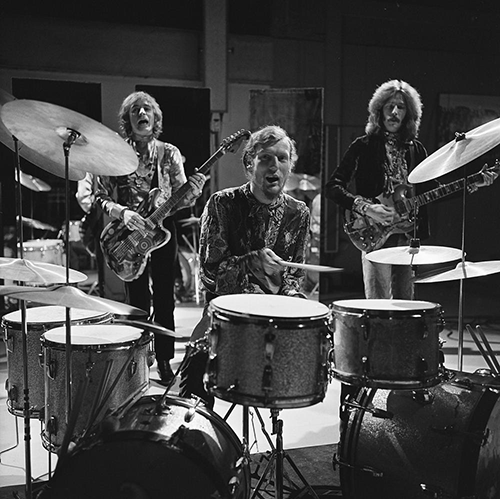
Ginger Baker (drummer) in 1968

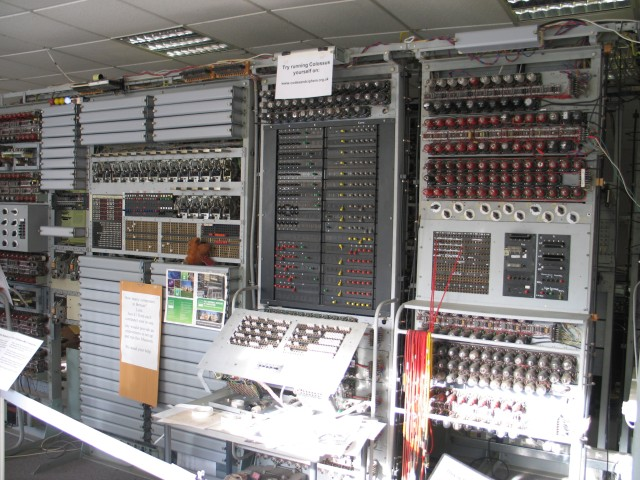
Replica of the Colossus computer in October 2009, designed by Tommy Flowers at Dollis Hill in 1944

- Ginger Baker, drummer with Cream
- Adrian Biddle, cinematographer
- Jools Holland, musician and TV presenter
- Frankie Howerd, actor and comedian
- Graham Johnson, Kent cricketer
- Philip Mackie, screenwriter with the Ministry of Information films, and grandfather of actress Pearl Mackie
- Terence James Reed, Taylor Professor of the German Language and Literature from 1989 to 2004 at the University of Oxford
- Jack Rose, RAF fighter pilot and colonial administrator
- William G. Stewart, television producer
- Steve Peregrin Took, musician with T. Rex (band)
- Steve White, drummer with The Style Council in the 1980s

=== Eaglesfield School ===
- Craig Fairbrass, actor (EastEnders, Cliffhanger)
- Andy Fordham, professional darts player
- Marvin Humes, member of JLS, television presenter and radio host
- KRSNA, rapper
- Lee Murray, MMA fighter and mastermind behind the Tunbridge Wells Securitas depot robbery
