= Shrewsbury Barrow =

Bronze Age burial mound

Coordinates: 51°28′29″N 0°4′13″E

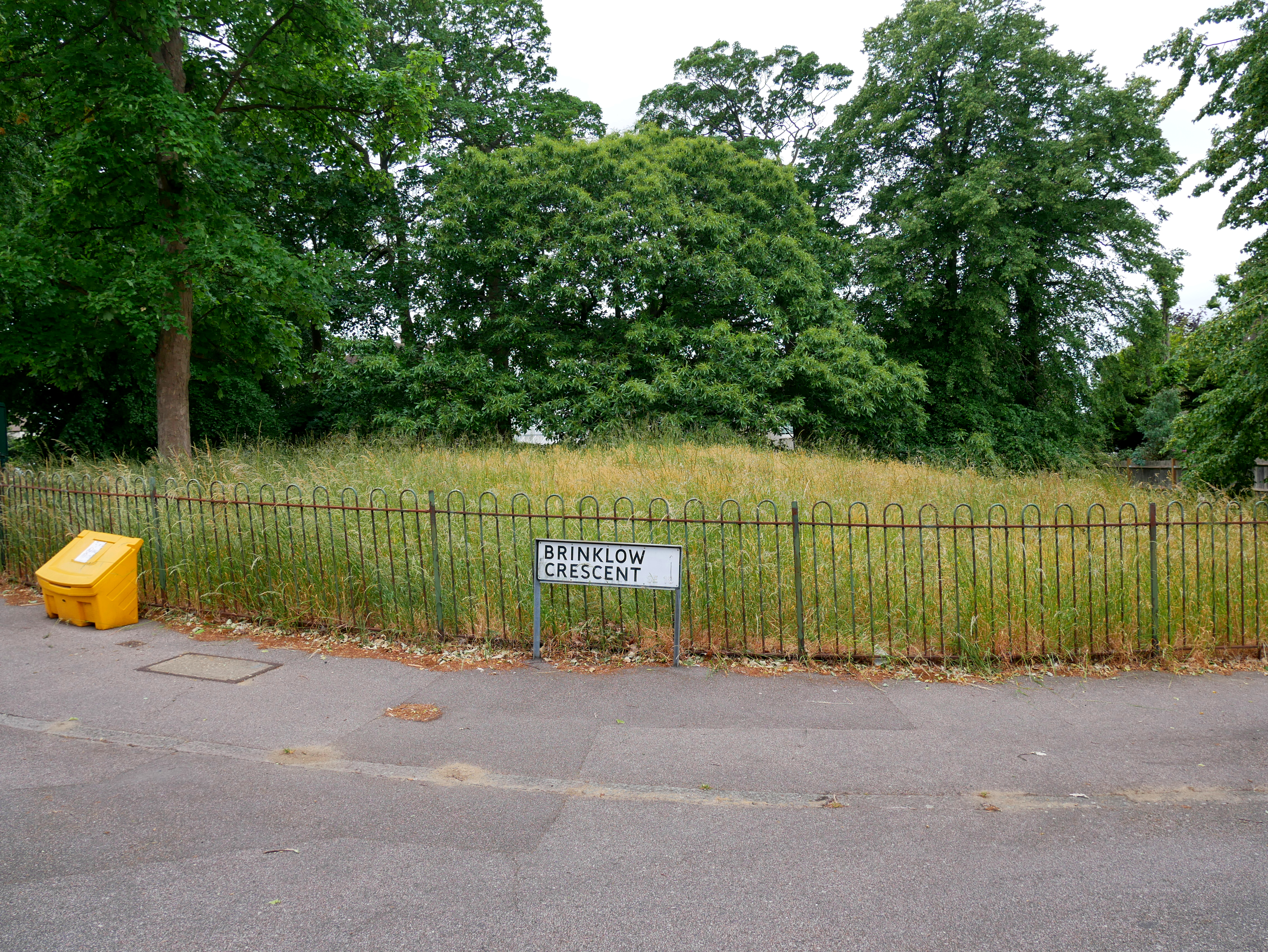
Shrewsbury Barrow, the only surviving Bronze Age burial mound on Shooter's Hill

Shrewsbury Barrow is a Bronze Age burial mound (also known as a tumulus) in Shooter's Hill in South East London, in the Royal Borough of Greenwich. It is a Scheduled Monument.

== History ==
The Shrewsbury Barrow is named after the 15th Earl of Shrewsbury, who built nearby Shrewsbury House in 1789 (that Shrewsbury House was demolished, and, in 1923, replaced by the existing building of the same name). The barrow is adjacent to Shrewsbury Park.

It is the only surviving barrow of a group of six; or possibly two groups of three. The other barrows were destroyed during the development of the surrounding estate in the 1930s. The barrows are located at the top of the hill, and would have been visible from the foot of the hill, silhouetted against the sky.

The only detailed description of the lost burial mounds is that of Col AH Bagnold in the parish magazine of Christ Church, Shooter's Hill. The Shrewsbury Barrow is No 1 in Bagnold's list. Tower House has been demolished, but, in his childhood, the future cabinet minister Douglas Jay lived there, and he recalled playing on the tumulus as a child. Bagnold's optimism about the future prospects of No 6 was misplaced.

"No. 1 Mound, about 75ft in diameter, formerly in Tower House garden, now in the angle between Plum Lane and Mayplace Lane. Opened recently; contents unknown.
No. 2 Mound, about 36ft in diameter on a site formerly in the grounds of Shrewsbury House, now on the west side of Ashridge Crescent. Destroyed 1934-35.
No. 3 Mound, about 60ft in diameter on a site on the north side of Ashridge Crescent. Destroyed 1934-35.
No. 4. A similar mound on the same side of Ashridge Crescent. Destroyed 1934-35.
No. 5. A very low mound was on a line between two conspicuous trees – a cedar and a Spanish chestnut – which have been allowed to remain in Ashridge Crescent. Destroyed 1934-35.
No. 6. Shrewsbury Park L.C.C. Recreation Ground. Under the trees a few yards west of the drinking fountain is a symmetrical mound 45ft – 50ft in diameter and about 2ft high. It has not been opened.
No. 7. Plumstead Common. On the eastern part (Winn’s Common) is a mound about 60ft in diameter and much worn down. It has obviously been opened, but when and by whom cannot be ascertained, nor is anything known about the fate of any relics this tumulus may have contained.

It is a most regrettable fact that six mounds which, perhaps, all contained interesting remains of the people who lived long ago in this district have all been destroyed or plundered and their contents hopelessly lost. The single barrow which has not been opened (No. 6) is fortunately safe from unauthorised relic-hunters. Some day perhaps and with the consent of the London County Council a proper examination of this site may be made."

== Location ==
It is located on the corners of Brinklow Crescent and Plum Lane. It is approximately 25m wide and 1.5m high.

== Nearby burial mounds ==
There were other burial mounds nearby, and a small number remain, including the one on Winn's Common (No 7 in Bagnold's list) and a badly damaged one in Lesnes Abbey Woods.
