= Jack Rose (colonial administrator) =

British fighter pilot and colonial administrator

Administrator of the Cayman Islands
- In office February 1960 – March 1963
- Monarch: Elizabeth II
- Preceded by: Alan Hilliard Donald (Commissioner)
- Succeeded by: John Alfred Cumber

Personal details
- Born: 18 January 1917 Blackheath, London
- Died: 10 October 2009 (aged 92)

Military service
- Allegiance: United Kingdom
- Branch/service: Royal Air Force
- Years of service: 1938–1946
- Rank: Wing commander
- Battles/wars: Second World War: Battle of France; Battle of Britain; Channel Front; Invasion of Normandy; Burma campaign
- Awards: Companion of the Order of St Michael and St George; Member of the Order of the British Empire; Distinguished Flying Cross

Jack Rose, CMG, MBE, DFC (18 January 1917 – 10 October 2009) was a British Royal Air Force (RAF) fighter pilot and colonial administrator. He fought as a pilot in the Battle of Britain during World War II, and later in the war pioneered the tactic of firing rockets from fighter-bombers. Rose was one of the very few pilots who survived operating on both the first and last days of the war. After the war ended, Rose became an administrator in the British Colonial Office. He was Administrator of the Cayman Islands from 1960 to 1963.

== Early life ==
Born in Blackheath, London, Rose was educated at Shooters Hill School before studying science at University College London. He joined the Royal Air Force Volunteer Reserve in October 1938, training as a fighter pilot.

== Military service ==
Rose served in the Royal Air Force (RAF) in northern France in May 1940, flying a Hawker Hurricane from No 3 Squadron's Merville airbase. He shot down three German aircraft. However, on 19 May his Hurricane was so badly damaged that he had to make a forced landing. The squadron was then evacuated to England, and Rose joined No. 32 Squadron based at Biggin Hill. On 25 August 1940, his aircraft was hit, and he parachuted into the English Channel but was spotted and rescued thanks to a fluorescent marker dye pack sewn into his overalls.

Rose then moved to Exeter, flying sorties over northern France with Czech and Polish squadrons, and in October 1942 he was awarded the Distinguished Flying Cross. In December 1942, he was promoted to command No. 184 squadron, pioneering the operational use of rocket projectiles fired from single-engined Hurricane fighter bombers (these 'Tankbusters' were later replaced with Hawker Typhoons). The squadron was heavily involved in the build-up to the invasion of Normandy, and, after D-Day, from 27 June 1944 Rose led his squadron on ground attack missions from a forward airfield near Caen.

From November 1944 to May 1945, Rose commanded No. 113 Squadron at Kwetgne in Burma, providing air support to the Fourteenth Army's advance on Rangoon. After the Japanese surrender, he assisted with the repatriation of recently released Allied prisoners of war in Penang.

== Colonial service ==
Following his release from the RAF in 1946, Rose joined the Colonial Service, serving as a district officer in the Barotseland district of Northern Rhodesia (today part of Zambia), and two terms as district commissioner, first in Kalabo and then Kaloma. He transferred to Lusaka for two years, before moving to the Chingola district.

In 1960, Rose became the first Administrator of the Cayman Islands. During his four years there, he commissioned a draft company law which expanded the islands' tax haven status. He was appointed a Member of the Order of the British Empire in the 1954 New Year Honours and a Companion of the Order of St Michael and St George in the 1963 New Year Honours.

In 1963, Rose was appointed deputy governor of British Guiana (now Guyana).

Rose retired in 1979, after having served as secretary of the Salmon and Trout Association from 1975.
