= Shooter's Hill =

District in South East London, England

Coordinates: 51.4691°N 0.0669°E

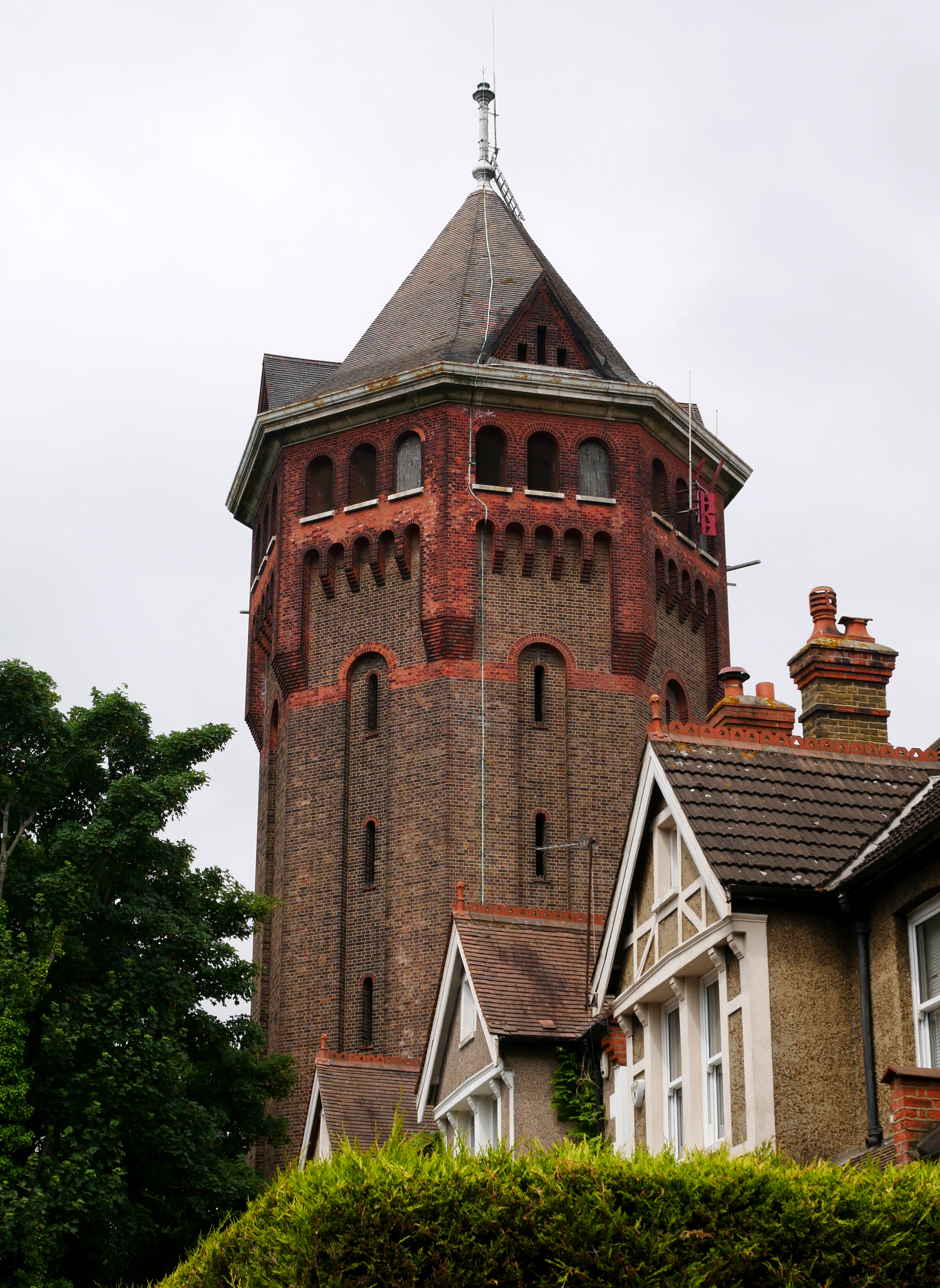
- The water tower on Shooter's Hill is a local landmark

- Location within Greater London
- Population: 13,433 (2011 Census ward)
- OS grid reference: TQ435765
- Ceremonial county: Greater London
- Region: London
- Country: England
- Sovereign state: United Kingdom
- Post town: LONDON
- Postcode district: SE18, SE3 (part)
- Dialling code: 020
- Police: Metropolitan
- Fire: London
- Ambulance: London
- UK Parliament: Erith and Thamesmead

Shooter's Hill is a district of South East London, England, straddling the Royal Borough of Greenwich and the London Borough of Bexley. It lies north of Eltham and south of Woolwich. With a height of 132 metres (433 ft), it is the highest point in the Borough of Greenwich and one of the highest points in London. Shooter's Hill also gives its name to the road which passes through east to west, part of the A207 road, the A2 road and Watling Street.

== Geography ==
The name Shooters Hill is thought to take its name from the practice of archery there during the Middle Ages. The area had a reputation as a haunt for highwaymen and was infamous as a site of gibbets of executed criminals.

On 1 May 1515, Henry VIII and Catherine of Aragon rode from Greenwich Palace to have breakfast in an arbour constructed in a wood at Shooter's Hill. Catherine and her ladies were dressed in Spanish-style riding gear, Henry was dressed in green velvet. Twelve men of the royal guard were disguised as Robin Hood and his men. There was a pageant and a masque or dance.

In the Second World War it was the site of an array of anti-aircraft guns to protect London. As part of 'London Stop Line Central' it was a last line of defence from a German land invasion, that was assumed would follow Watling Street from Dover. A number of devices were under the control of the Home Guard including a fougasse and a flame thrower. Adjacent to an anti-aircraft battery was a prisoner-of-war camp on what is today part of a golf course on the north-eastern slopes. North of the golf course is Shrewsbury Park, the site for a barrage balloon, part of the Air Ministry's Field Scheme Nosecap for the defence of London; during the Battle of Britain it was manned by 901 County of London Barrage Balloon Squadron.

Eltham Common was the site of Shooter's Hill police station (now closed). Eltham was allegedly the only town in England with two fully functional police stations (the other in Well Hall Road), having been placed there owing to the lawlessness associated with the town.

Celia Fiennes, who in 1697 proceeded out of London along the Dover Road, wrote in her diary of stopping at:

Shuttershill, on top of which hill you see a vast prospect ...some lands clothed with trees, others with grass and flowers, gardens, orchards, with all sorts of herbage and tillage, with severall little towns all by the river, Erith, Leigh, Woolwich etc., quite up to London, Greenwich, Deptford, Black Wall, the Thames twisting and turning it self up and down bearing severall vessells and men of warre on it...

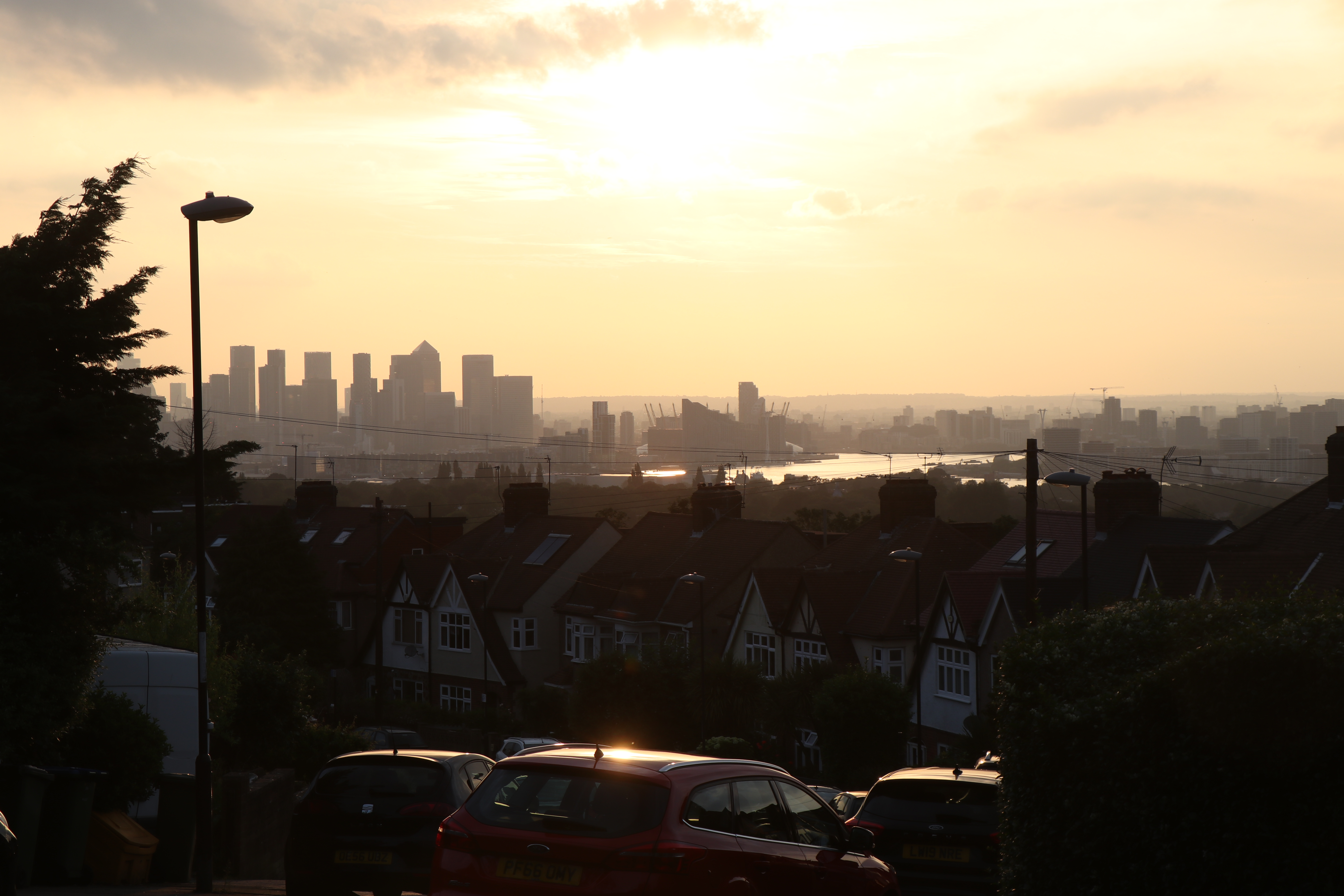
View west from Shooter's Hill, showing Canary Wharf district, north Greenwich and River Thames

The hill is one of the highest points in London at 132 metres (433 ft) – offering good views over the River Thames to the north, with central London clearly visible to the west. Oxleas Wood remains a public open space close to the top of the hill; on the north side of Shooter's Hill Road is Eaglesfield Park, Shrewsbury Park, a golf-course, and one of the last remaining areas of farmland in inner London, Woodlands Farm (now an educational charity).

Shooter's Hill Road stretches eastwards from the heath at Blackheath up and over the hill, initially as part of the A2 road as far as the Sun in the Sands, and then the A207. The road follows the route of Watling Street, a Roman Road linking London with Roman settlements in north Kent. This was used as a route for horse-drawn mail-coaches linking London with Dover.

== Literary associations ==
Byron's Don Juan is waylaid while romantically musing on Shooter's Hill when he first arrives in London (Canto XI). As the narrative of Charles Dickens's A Tale of Two Cities opens, Mr Jarvis Lorry is a passenger in the Dover mail coach, "lumbering up Shooter's Hill"; and Dickens refers to a public house there in The Pickwick Papers. The name Shooter's Hill is also mentioned in Bram Stoker's Dracula although referring to the Hampstead area, some distance away, and also in H. G. Wells' The War of the Worlds and by Thomas Carlyle.

On 11 April 1661, diarist Samuel Pepys mentions passing under "the man that hangs upon Shooter's Hill and a filthy sight it was to see how his flesh is shrunk to his bones." (presumably a highwayman hanged and left to rot as a warning to other criminals – at 'Gibbet Field', now part of the local golf course). In the graphic novel V for Vendetta by Alan Moore and David Lloyd, the character Evey Hammond describes her childhood, spent on Shooter's Hill.

== Landmarks ==
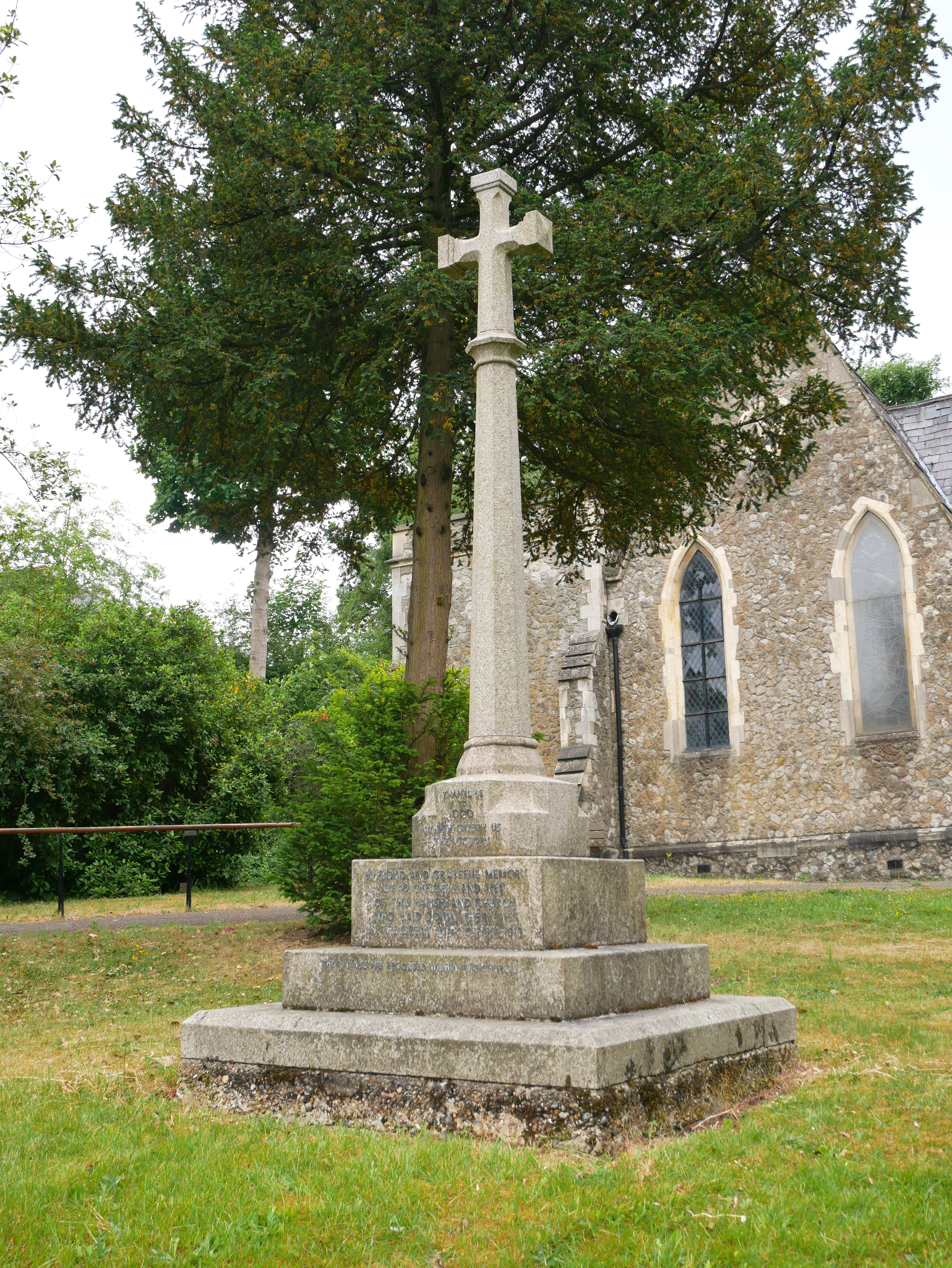
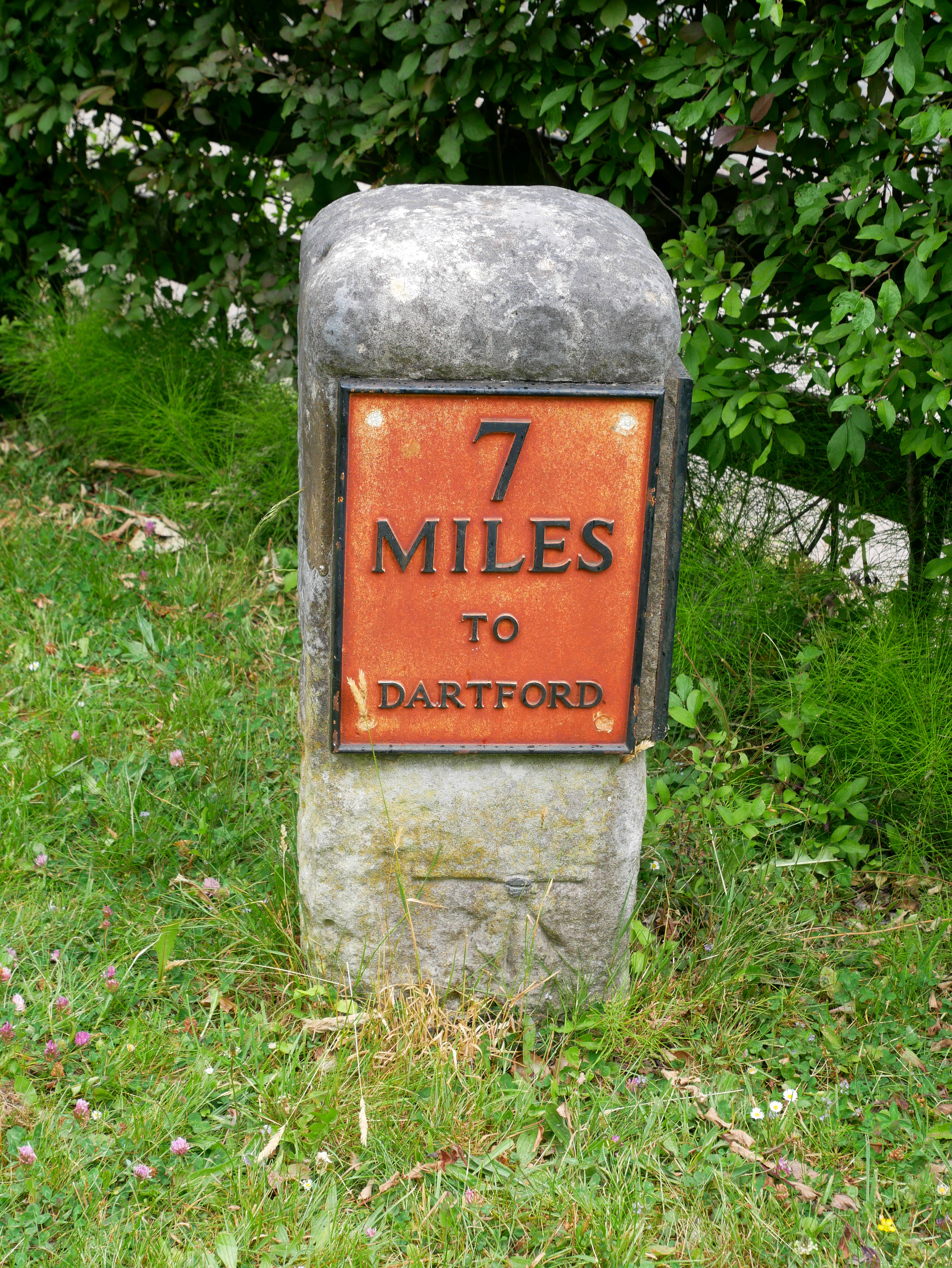
The grounds of Christ Church on Shooters Hill contains both a twentieth-century war memorial (left) and an eighteenth-century memorial milestone (right), now a Grade II listed structure

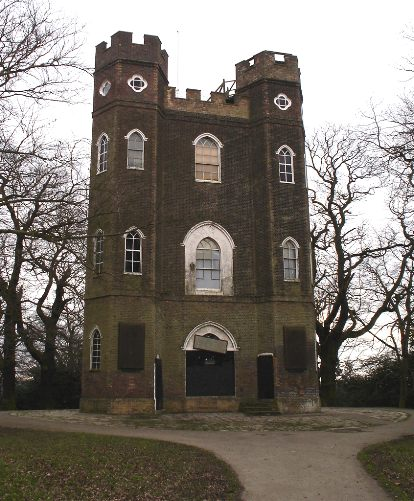
Severndroog Castle

The distinctive gothic revival water tower at the top of Shooter's Hill is a landmark built in 1910 and can be seen from far around. Other local landmarks include Severndroog Castle, a folly designed by the architect Richard Jupp in 1784 and built to commemorate Commodore Sir William James, who on 2 April 1755 attacked and destroyed a pirate fortress at Suvarnadurg along the western coast of India.

Another water tower (of 130 ft) is further west down Shooter's Hill. This was originally built in the 1890s to designs by Thomas W. Aldwinckle to supply water to the 'Brook Fever hospital', which was demolished in the 1990s, to be replaced by a housing development. The tower consists of a plain brick pillar ornamented simply with bands of terracotta tiles and windows like arrowslits. It is not listed, but it was cleaned, repointed and underpinned for conversion into a family home. It is the centrepiece of the housing estate.

Immediately to the east of the housing estate is the Grade II listed former Royal Herbert Hospital, today the Royal Herbert Pavilions. Further up the hill is the still-functioning Memorial Hospital.

In 1749, 'The Bull' public house opened just west of the summit of the hill, and was used as a refreshment stop by the coaches, although not by the Royal Mail, which had an interchange of mail bags at the Post Office by the Red Lion on the London side of the hill.

An 18th-century grade II listed milestone in the grounds of Christ Church on Shooter's Hill has 19th-century plates giving the distances "Dartford 7 miles", "London Bridge 8 miles" and a later addition: "130 miles to Ypres: in defending the salient our casualties were 90,000 killed, 70,500 missing, 450,000 wounded", commemorating the Battle of Ypres.

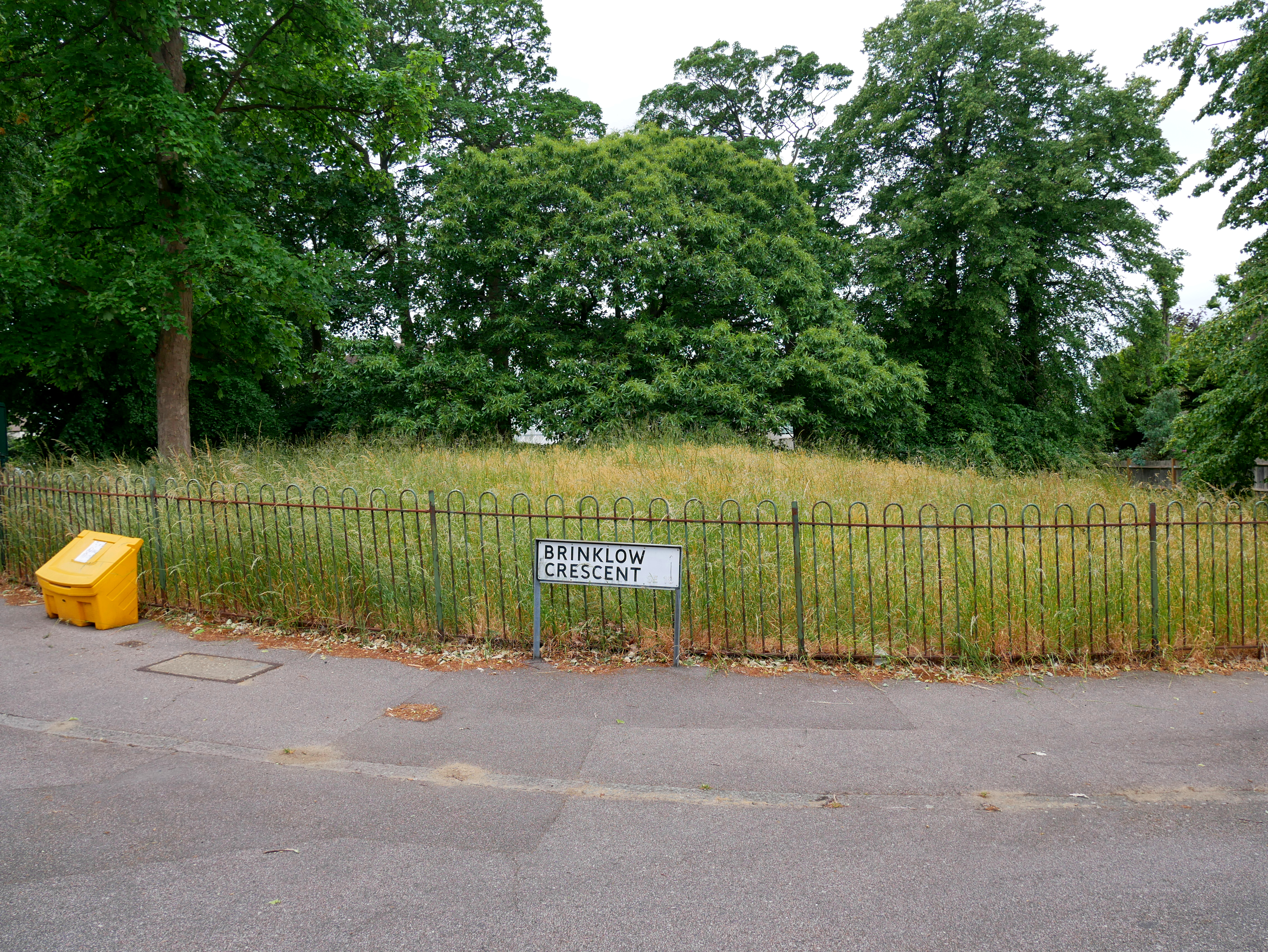
The Shrewsbury Tumulus, the only surviving Bronze Age burial mound on Shooter's Hill

Shrewsbury Barrow is a Bronze Age burial mound which is located on the corners of Brinklow Crescent and Plum Lane, and is a scheduled monument. It is approximately 25m wide and 1.5m high. It is the last surviving burial mound out of a group of six.

== Road alterations ==
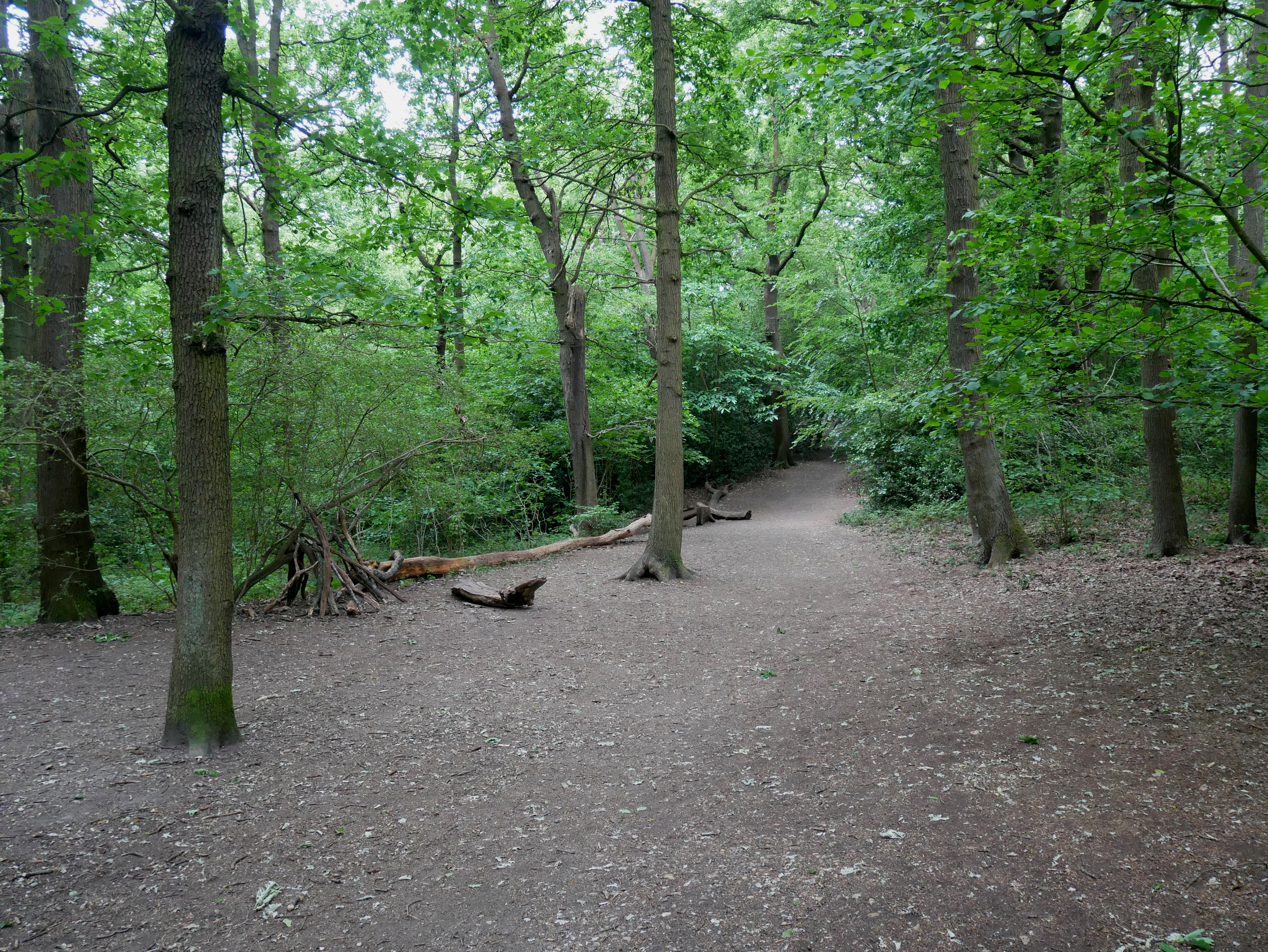
Jack Wood is on Shooter's Hill

During the 1950s the road gradient was lowered in the west where low-powered motor vehicles of the era frequently struggled to get to the top. As a remedy, a small section of the road west of the summit was removed and the road resurfaced from scratch to extend the slope horizontally. This alteration is evident where the road (opposite Craigholm) runs through the cutting and the pavement (following the original gradient of the hill) rises about 1–2 metres above.

== Schools ==
- Ark Greenwich Free School
- Christ Church Primary School
- Plumcroft Primary School
- Shooter's Hill Post 16 Campus, Red Lion Lane

== Notable former residents ==
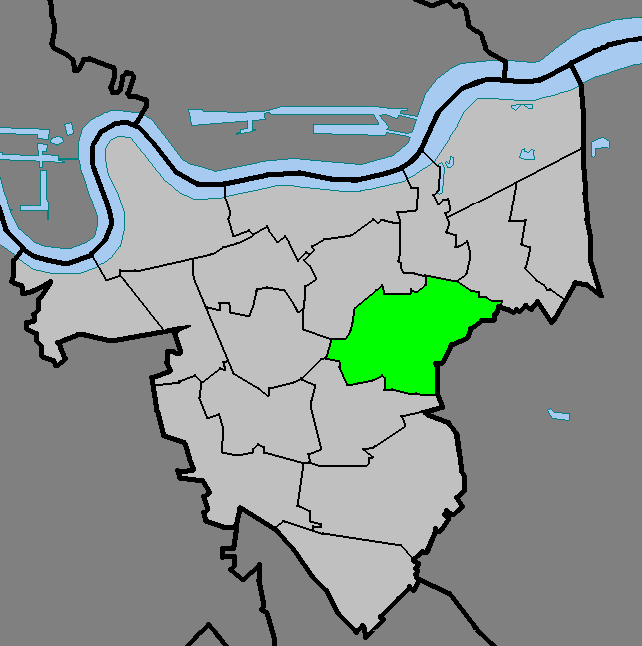
Shooter's Hill ward (green) within the Royal Borough of Greenwich (light grey)

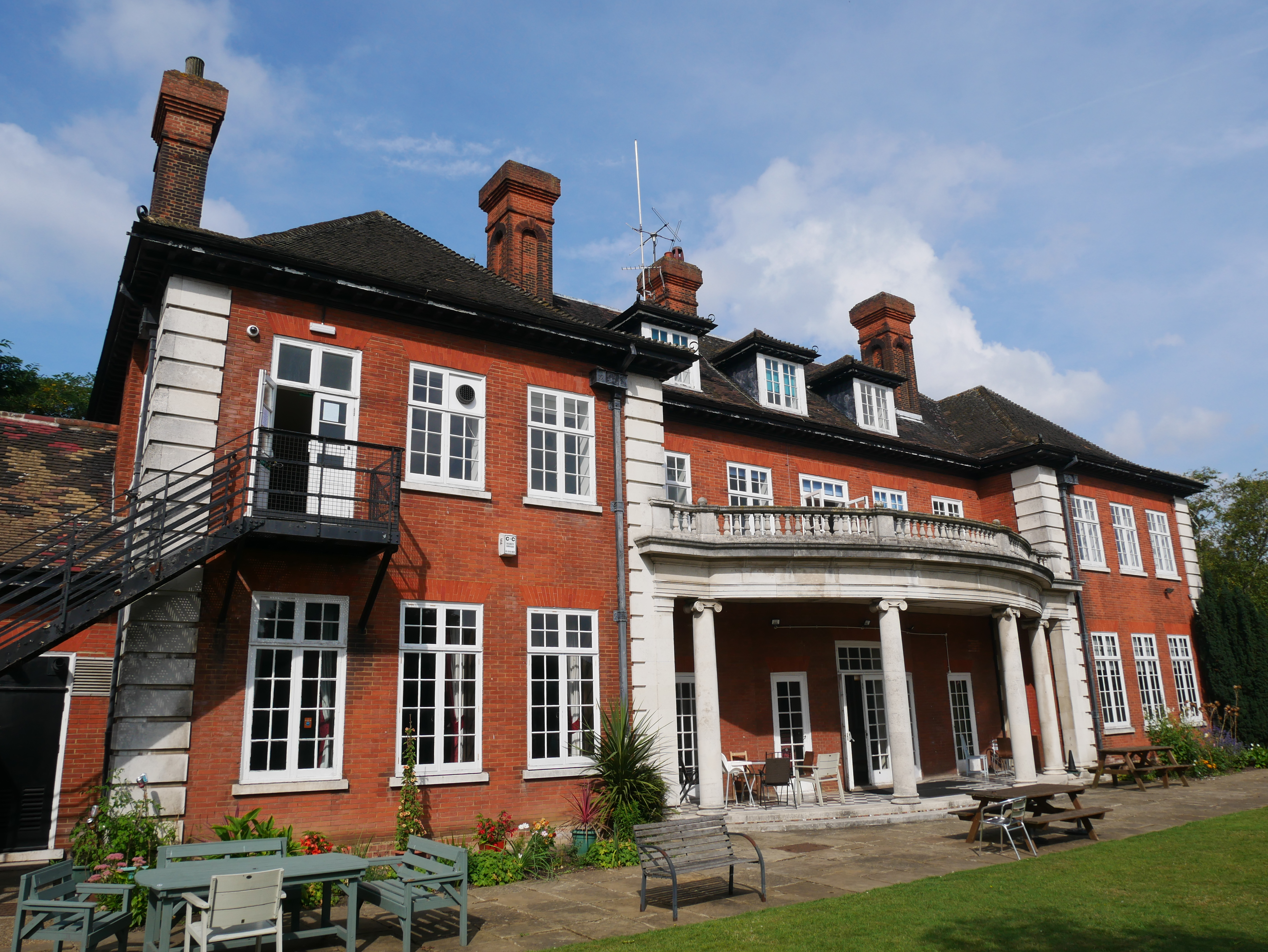
Shrewsbury House, built in 1923 and now Grade II listed

- Writer Algernon Blackwood was born in Shooter's Hill in 1869.
- English engineer Samuel Brown developed an internal combustion engine that used hydrogen as a fuel and tested it to propel a vehicle (arguably one of the earliest automobiles) up Shooter's Hill in 1826.
- TV cook Fanny Cradock and her husband Johnnie Cradock lived in Shooter's Hill Road.
- Landscape painter William Robert Earl died there in 1880.
- Architect Thomas Ford lived in Shooter’s Hill and was a warden and captain of the air battery during the Second World War.
- Musician Jools Holland was educated at Shooters Hill Grammar School, a former state grammar school on Red Lion Lane, Shooter's Hill, from which he was expelled for damaging a teacher's Triumph Herald.
- English actor-comedian-satirist Frankie Howerd was "gently educated at Shooter's Hill" Grammar School, as he recalled his time there.
- Noted comics writer Steve Moore spent his entire life living in the same house he was born in on Shooter's Hill. His life, area and its history were dramatised by Alan Moore's essay Unearthing in an anthology of essays on London edited by Iain Sinclair. Unearthing was later turned into a dramatic reading.
- Engineer Perceval M. Parsons (1819–1892) was educated at a private school in Shooter's Hill, later established a private laboratory behind his house on Shooters Hill Road where he formulated 'manganese bronze' used in the manufacture of ships' propellers, and died at his home on 5 November 1892.
- English musician-songwriter-guitarist Steve Peregrin Took (T.Rex, Shagrat, Steve Took's Horns) was educated at Shooter's Hill Grammar School on Red Lion Lane (formerly the Woolwich County School).
- British singer-songwriter Boy George (Culture Club) lived in Shooters Hill Road.

== Nearby places ==
- Woolwich
- Eltham
- East Wickham
- Plumstead
- Welling
- Blackheath
- Kidbrooke
- Westcombe Park
- Falconwood
- Mottingham
- Well Hall

== Transport ==
Shooter's Hill is served by many Transport for London bus services connecting it with areas including Blackheath, Woolwich, Eltham, Greenwich, Bexleyheath, Thamesmead, Lewisham and Crystal Palace. The closest rail links to the area are Welling and Falconwood railway stations.
