= Severndroog Castle =

Building in southeast London

Coordinates: 51.4666°N 0.0599°E

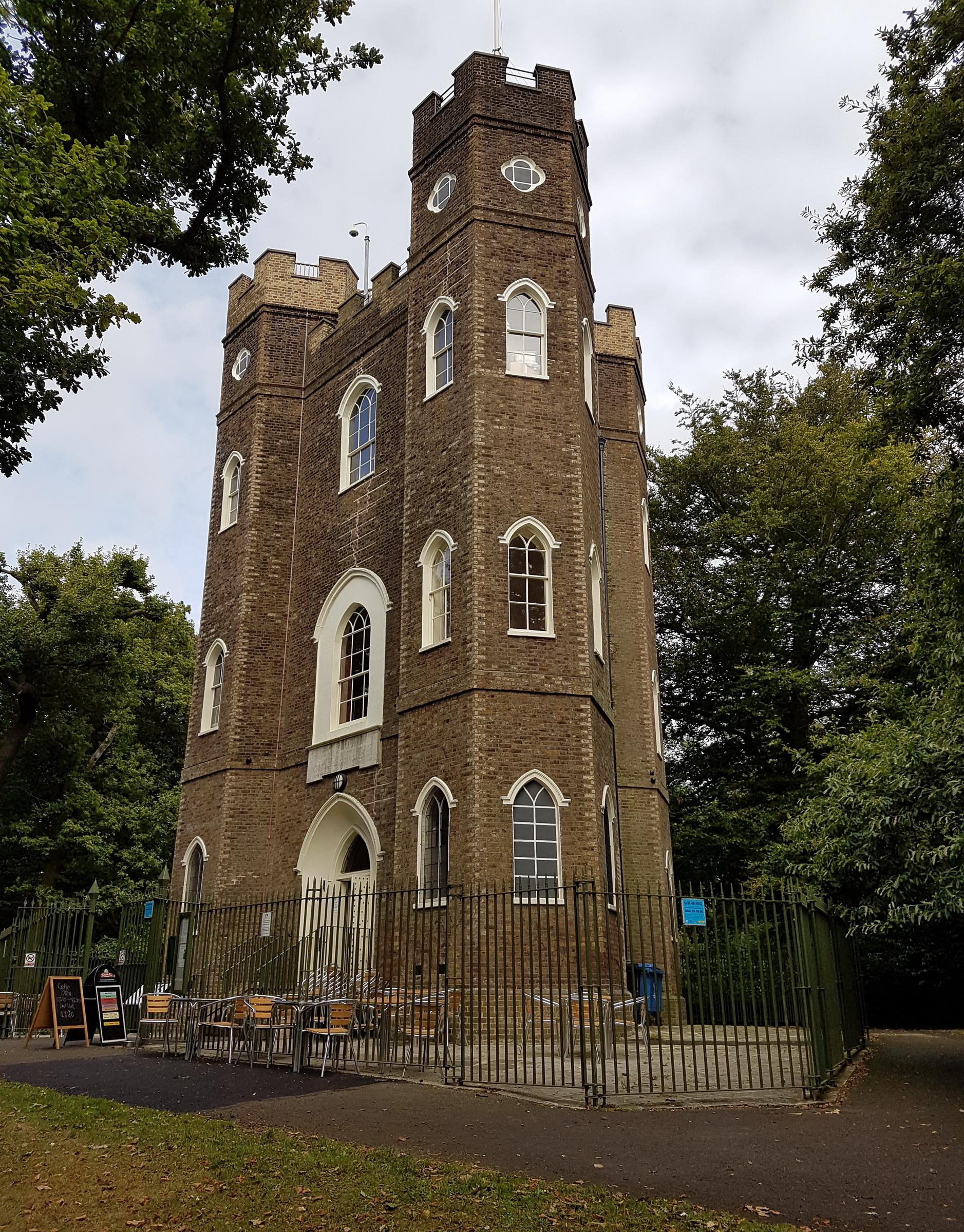
Severndroog Castle in Castle Wood

Severndroog Castle is a folly designed by architect Richard Jupp, with the first stone laid on 2 April 1784.

While commonly referred to as a castle due to its turrets, it was built as a folly, as can be discerned by its small size and because it has never functioned as a castle. It is situated in Castle Wood, on Shooter's Hill in south-east London in the Royal Borough of Greenwich.

It was built to commemorate Commodore Sir William James who, in April 1755, attacked and destroyed the island fortress of Suvarnadurg (then rendered in English: Severndroog) of the Maratha Empire on the western coast of India, between Mumbai and Goa. James died in 1783 and the folly was built as a memorial to him by his widow, Lady James of Eltham.

Designated a Grade II* listed building in 1954, the Gothic-style castle is 63 feet (19 m) high and triangular in section, with a hexagonal turret at each corner. From its elevated position, it offers views across London, with features in seven different counties visible on a clear day.

== History ==
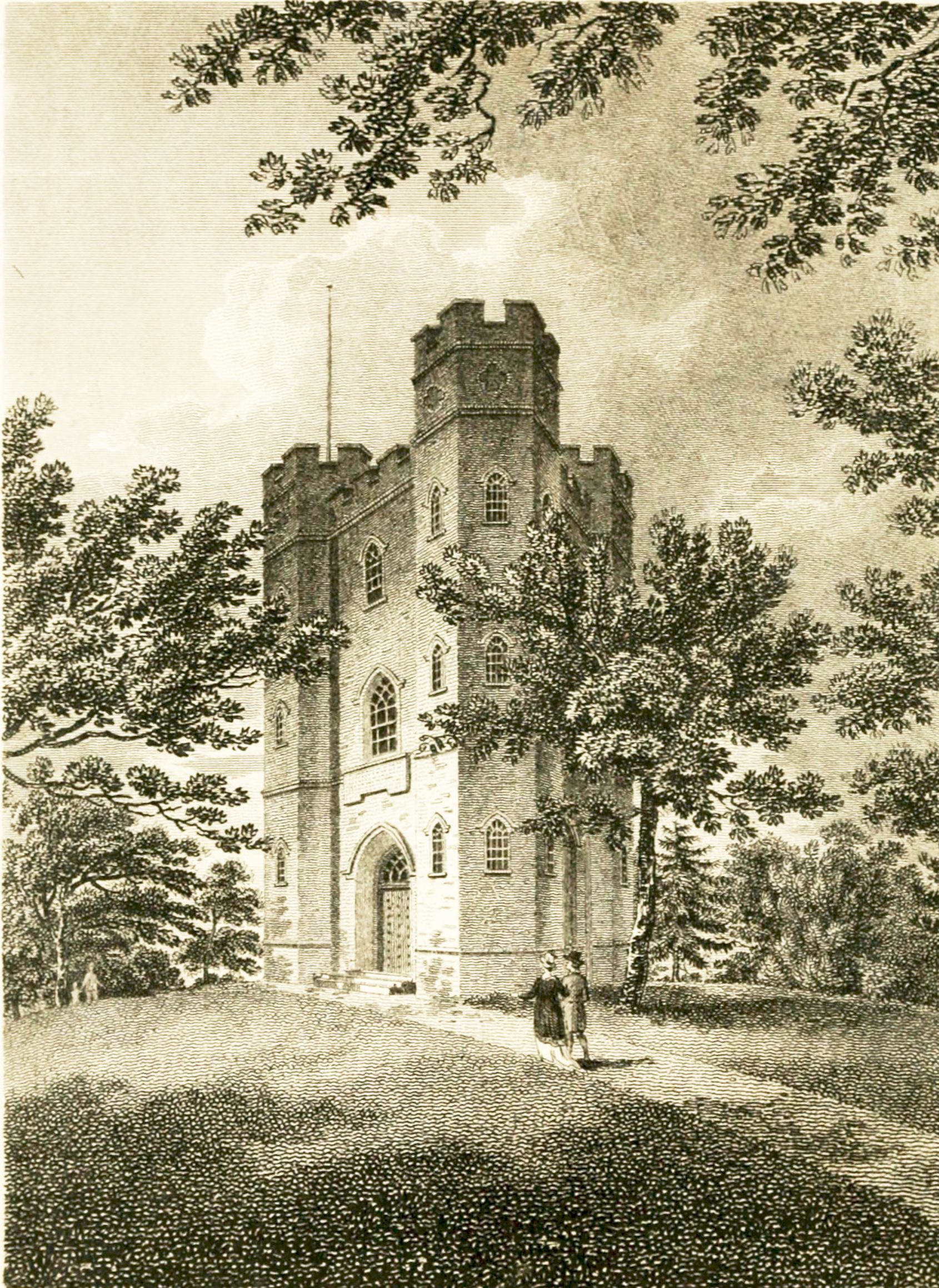
Engraving, c. 1815

Sir William James captured the Suvarnadurg fort (Golden fort) on western coast of India on 12 April 1755, this victory and later other triumphs led to change his rank to director in the East India company.

The tower was used by General William Roy in his trigonometric survey linking the nearby Royal Greenwich Observatory with the Paris Observatory; a 36-inch (0.91 m) theodolite (now in London's Science Museum) was temporarily installed on its roof. This Anglo-French Survey (1784–1790) led to the formation of the Ordnance Survey. In 1848, the Royal Engineers used the castle for their survey of London.

Following Lady James' death in 1798, the building passed through the hands of various landowners, including John Blades, a former Sheriff of London, a Mr Barlow (ship owner) who built nearby Castle Wood House, and Thomas Jackson (a railway and docks contractor of Eltham Park). On 18 August 1845, the tower was visited by diarist William Copeland Astbury, who recorded the tower, layout, ownership and condition. In 1922, the tower was purchased by London County Council and it became a local visitor attraction with a ground-floor tearoom serving refreshments. In 1986, when the GLC was abolished, responsibility for Severndroog passed to Greenwich Council.

=== Restoration ===
In 1988, the local council could no longer afford the building's upkeep and it was boarded up. In 2002, a community group, the Severndroog Castle Building Preservation Trust, was established. In 2004, it featured in the BBC TV series Restoration (presented by Griff Rhys Jones, Ptolemy Dean and Marianne Suhr) to gain publicity and support to restore the building and open it to the public.

In July 2013 work began on renovating the castle, funded by a £595,000 Heritage Lottery Fund grant, and it was officially reopened to the public on 20 July 2014. The castle is open to public visitors and can be hired, wholly or in part, for private functions.

The Green Chain Walk and Capital Ring long-distance paths go through Eltham Common and Castle Wood and past the castle between Shooter's Hill and Eltham.

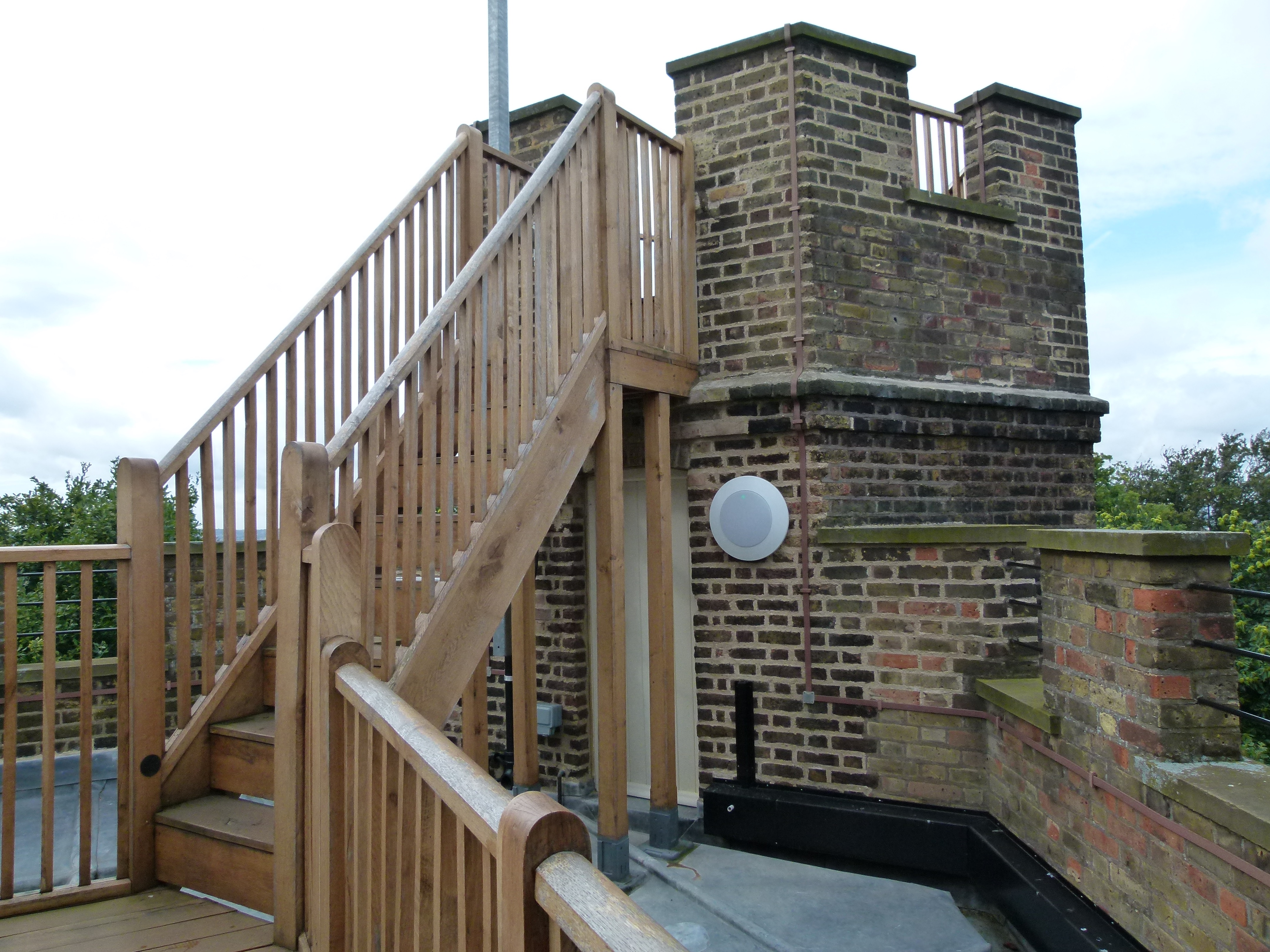
Viewing platform

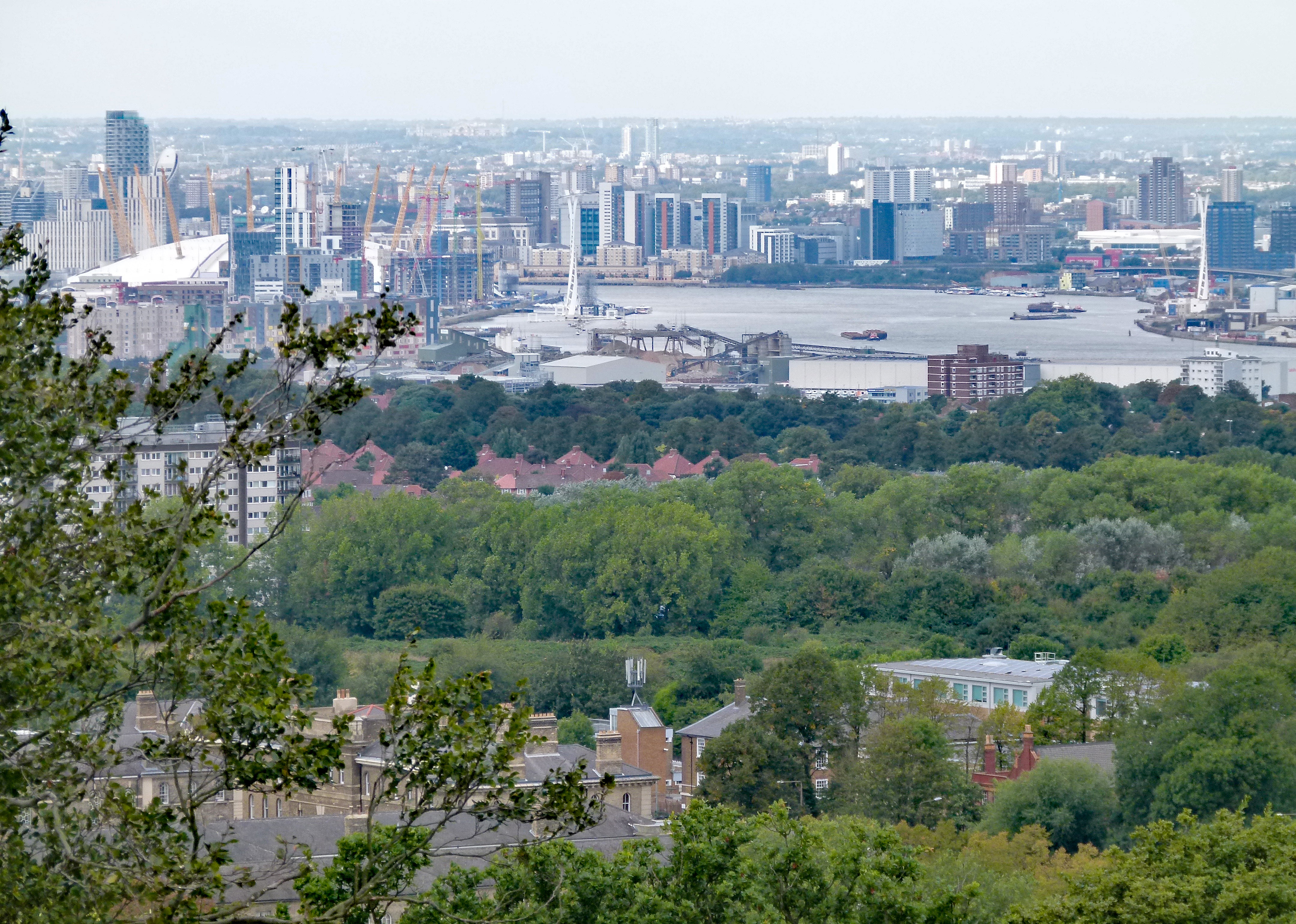
View towards the northwest

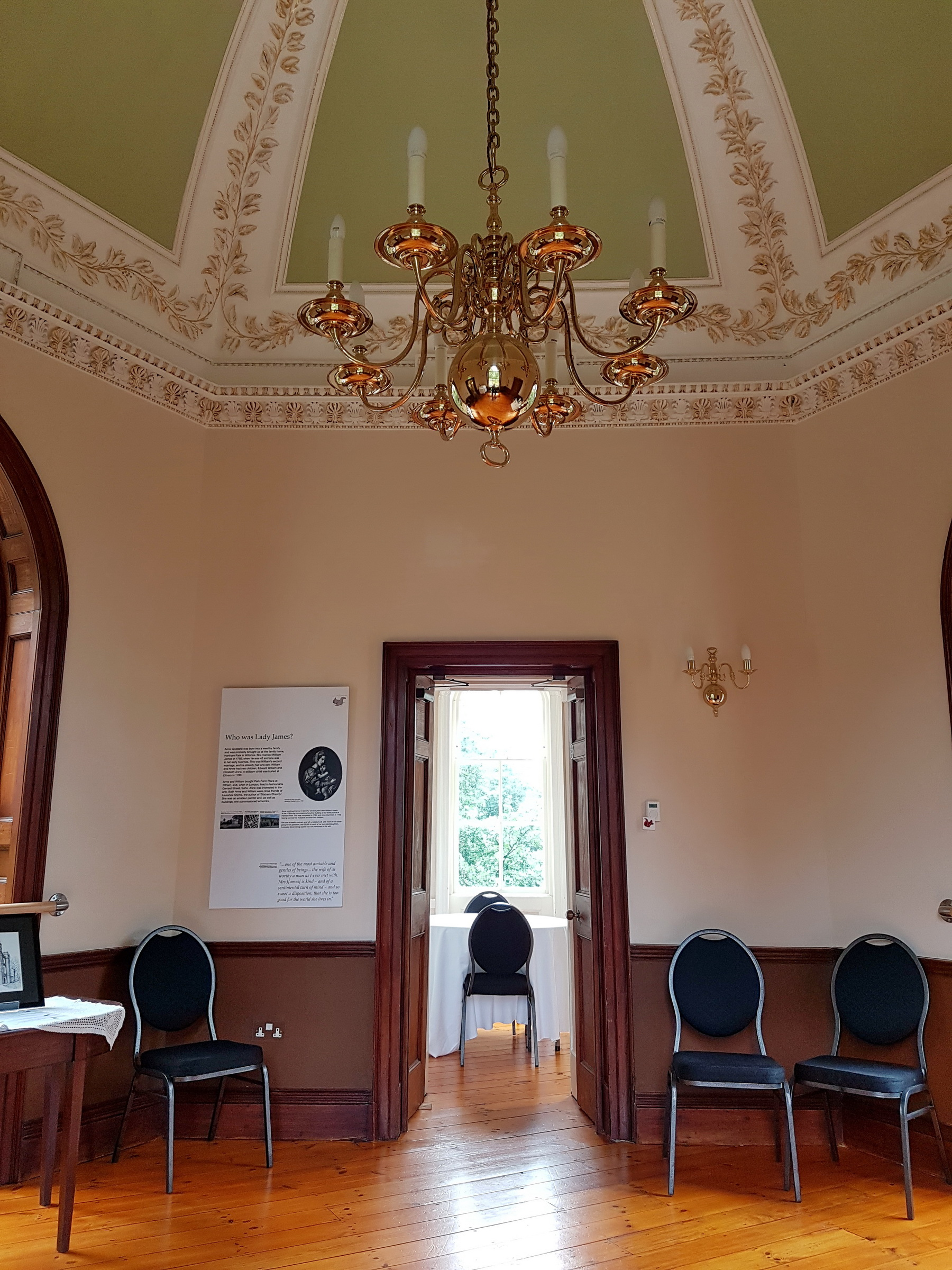
First floor

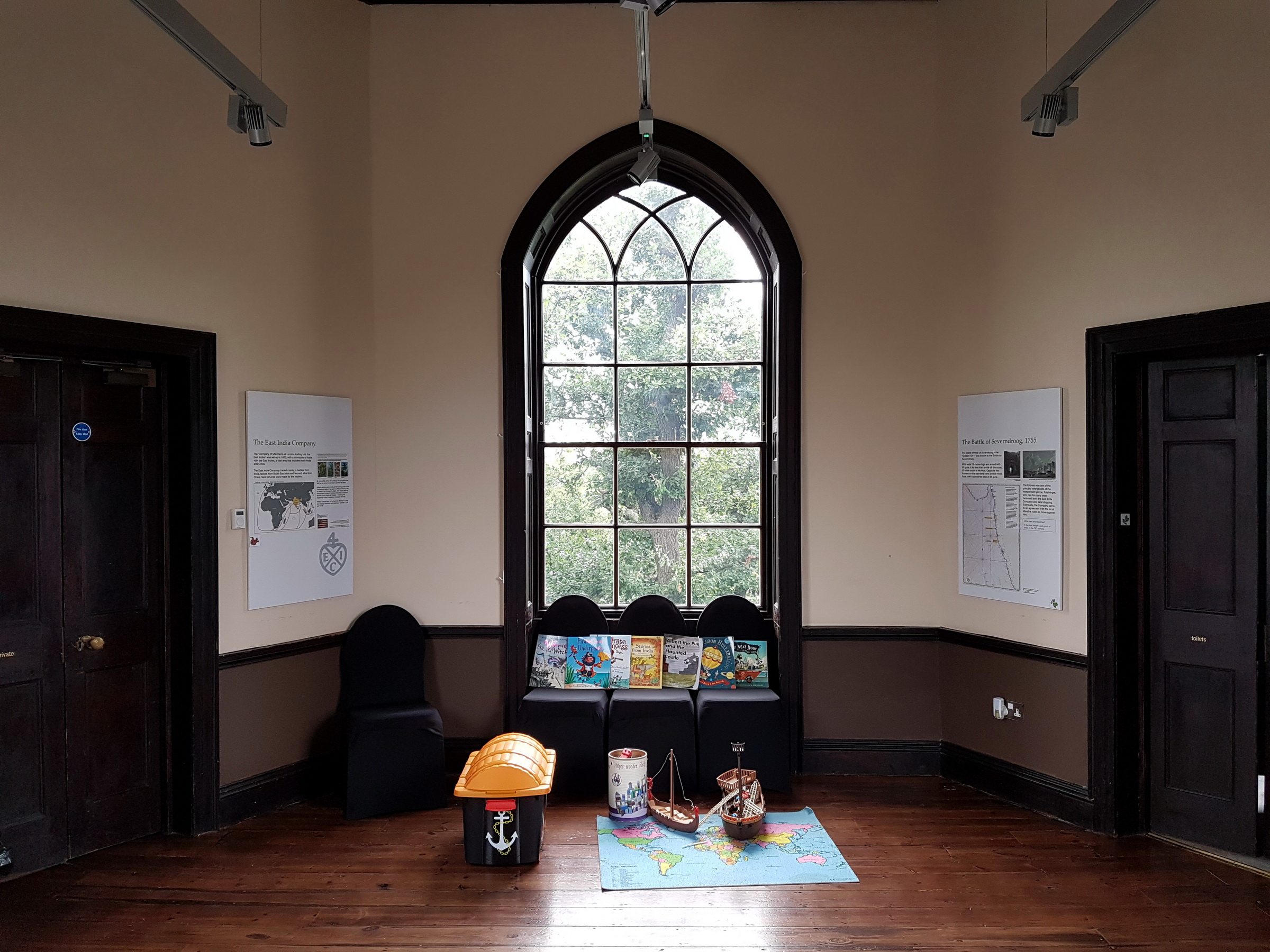
Second floor
