= Royal Borough of Greenwich =

Borough in London, United Kingdom

Coordinates: 51°27′N 0°03′E

- London borough, royal borough
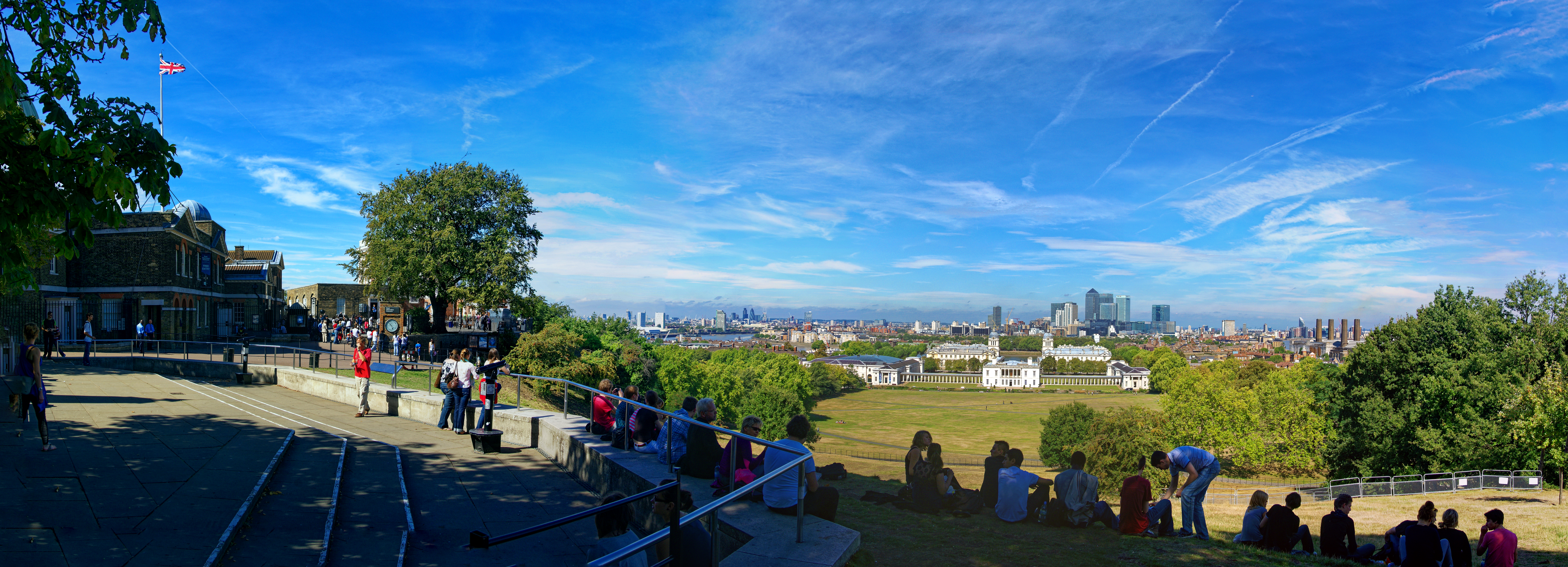
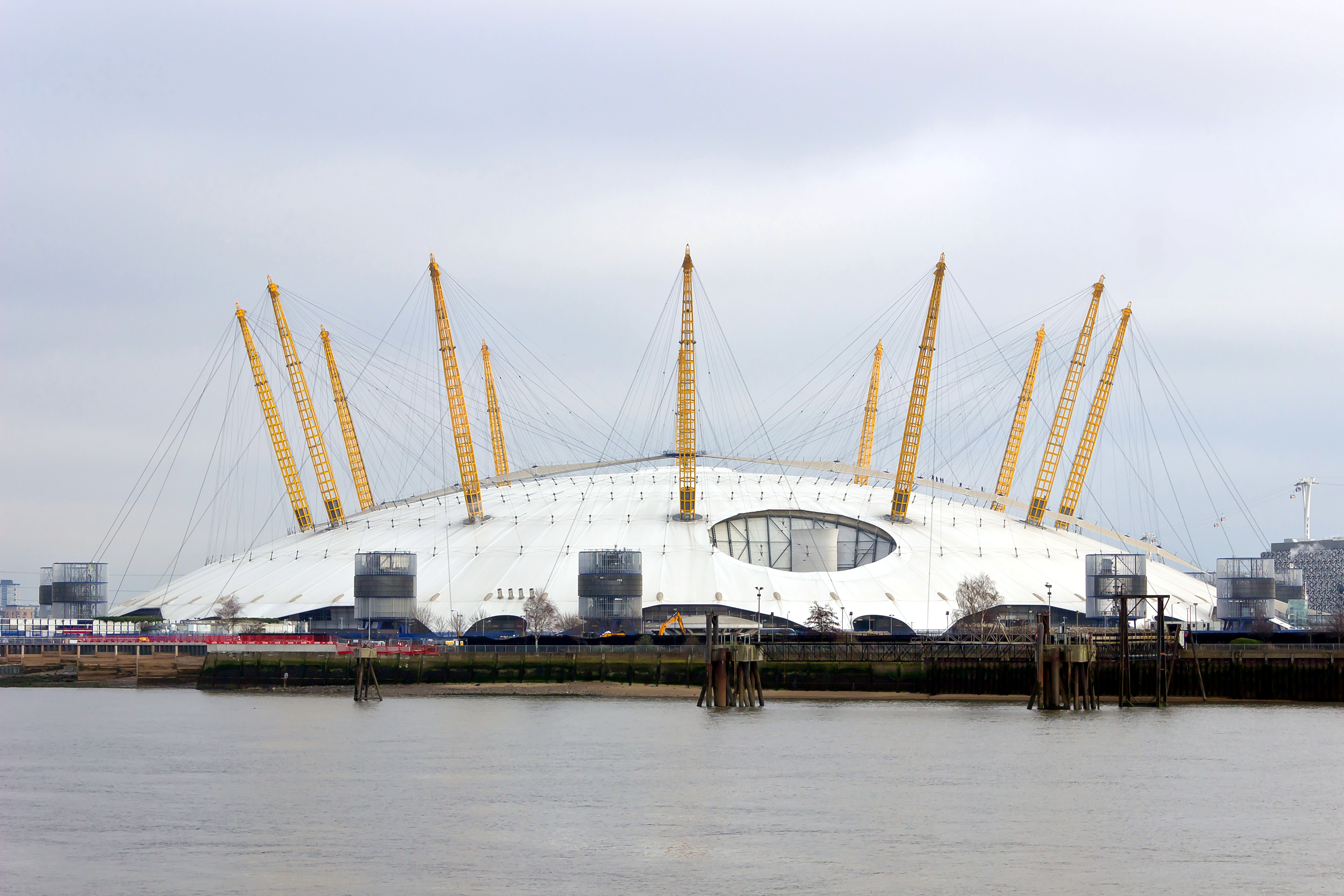
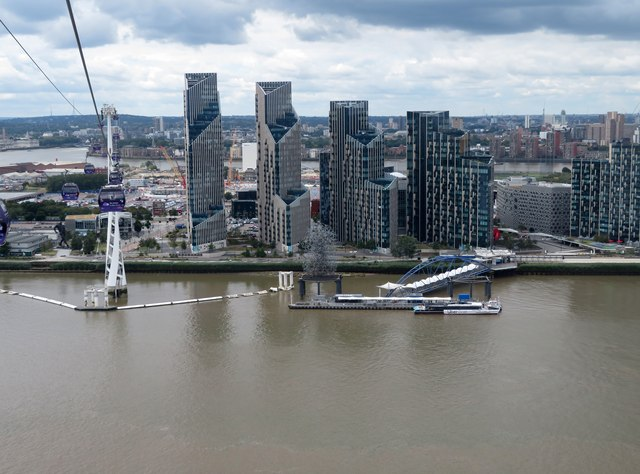
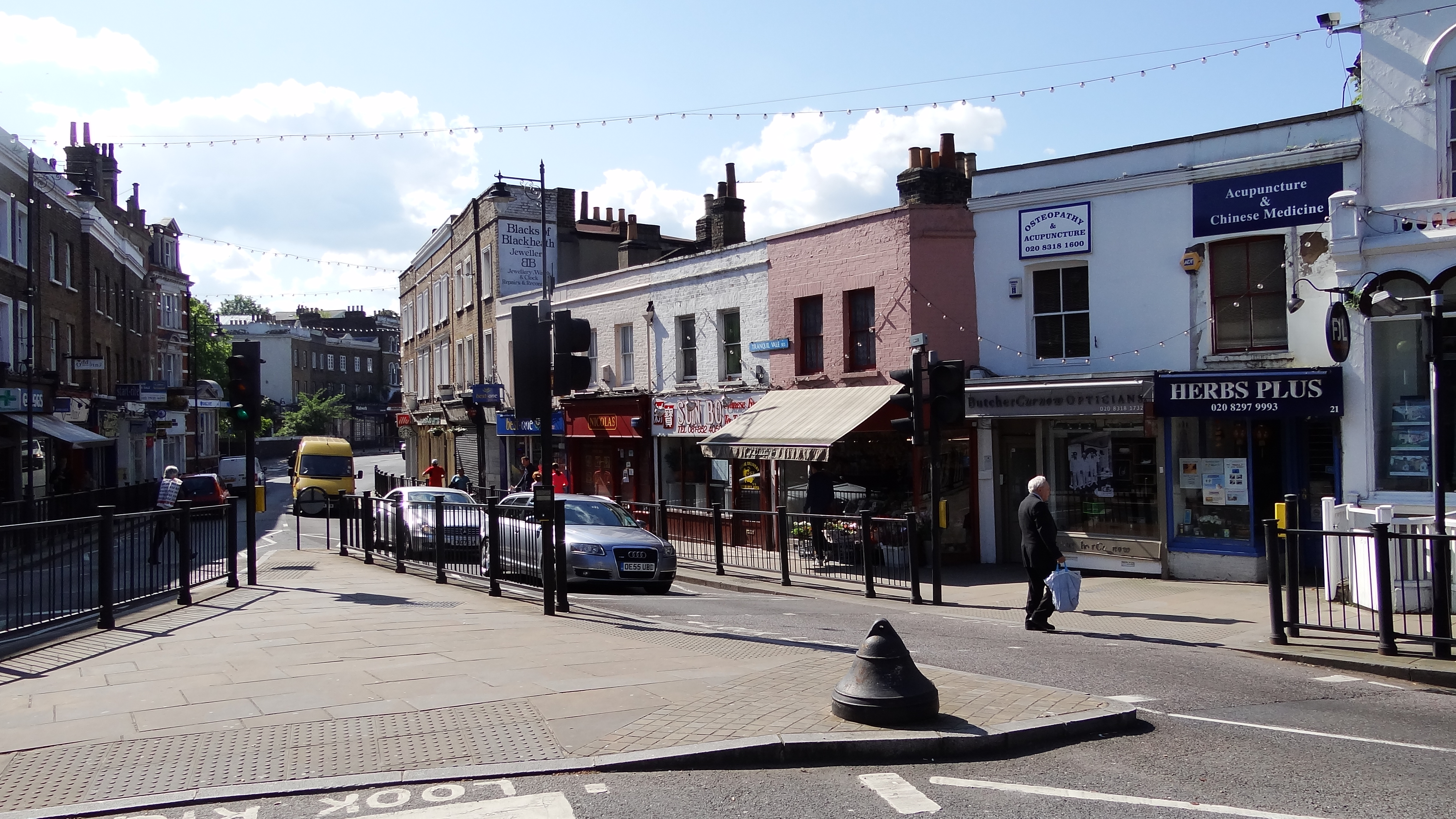
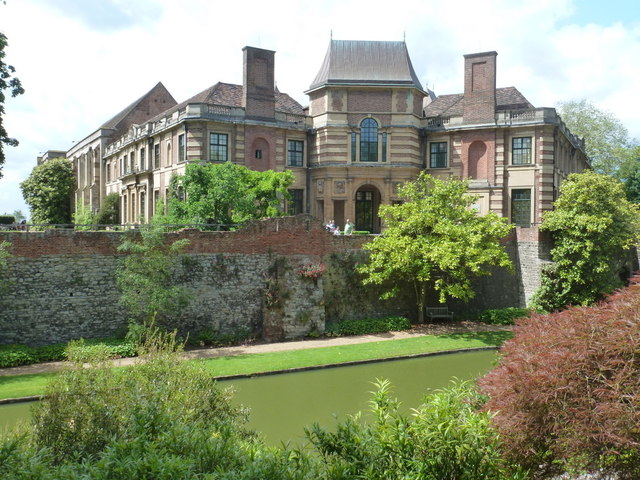
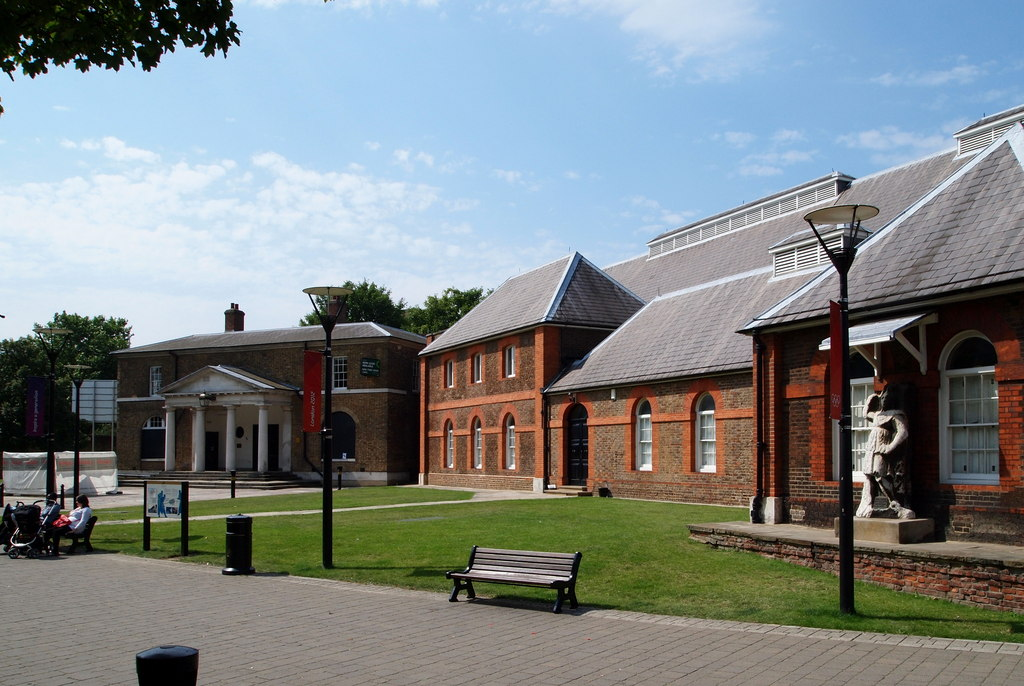
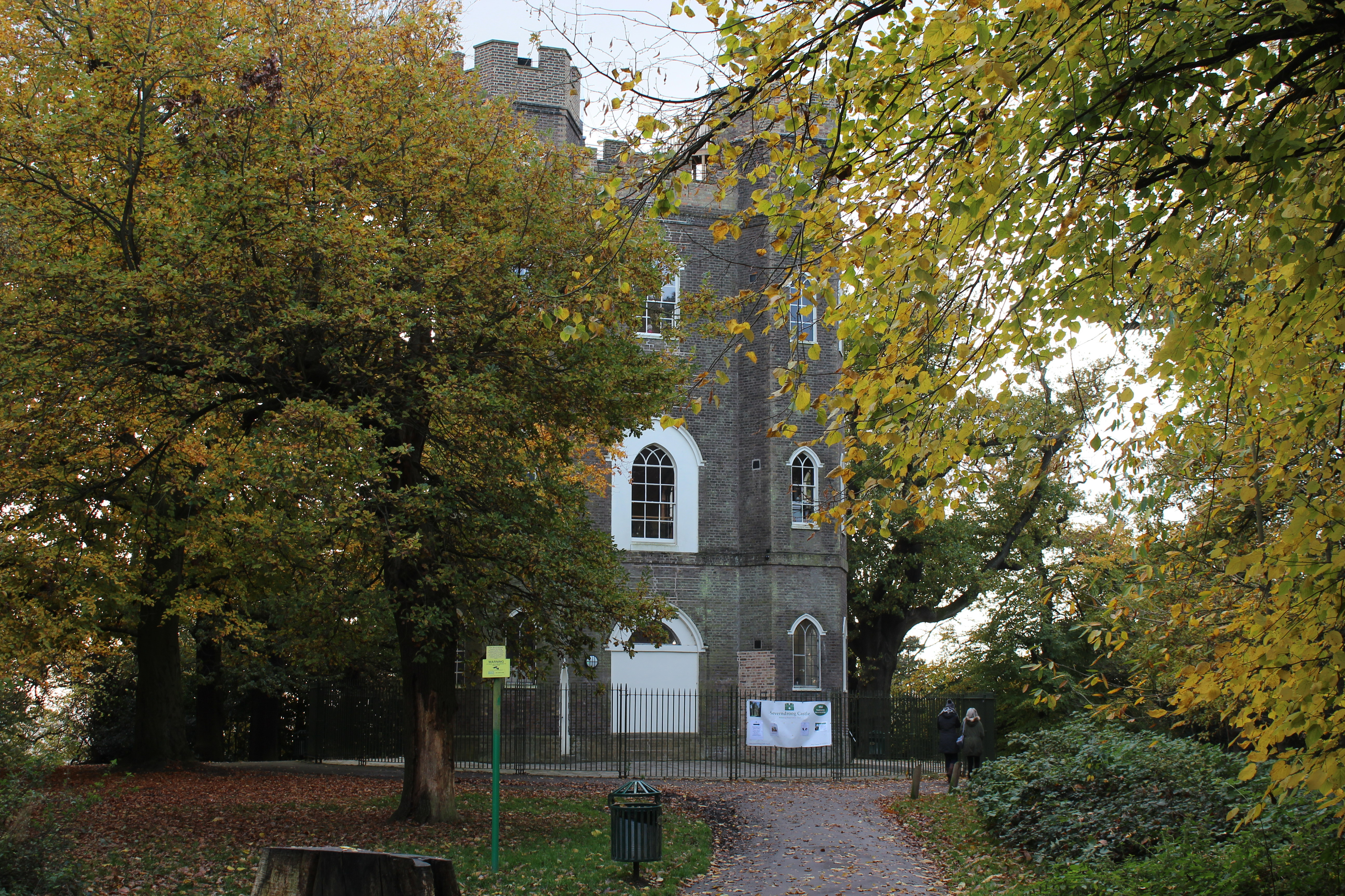
- Greenwich Park including the Royal Greenwich Observatory and the Royal Naval College The O2 Arena Greenwich Peninsula Blackheath Village Eltham Palace Royal Arsenal in Woolwich Severndroog Castle on Shooter's Hill

- Coat of arms Council logo
- Motto: We Govern by Serving
- Greenwich shown within Greater London
- Sovereign state: United Kingdom
- Constituent country: England
- Region: London
- Ceremonial county: Greater London
- Created: 1 April 1965
- Admin HQ: Woolwich

Government
  - Type: London borough council
  - Body: Greenwich London Borough Council
  - London Assembly: Len Duvall (Labour) AM for Greenwich and Lewisham
  - MPs: Abena Oppong-Asare (Labour); Clive Efford (Labour); Matthew Pennycook (Labour)

Area
  - Total: 18.28 sq mi (47.35 km^{2})
  - Rank: 245th (of 296)

Population (2025)
  - Total: 301,225
  - Rank: 52nd (of 296)
  - Density: 16,480/sq mi (6,362/km^{2})
- Time zone: UTC (GMT)
  - Summer (DST): UTC+1 (BST)
- Postcodes: SE, DA, BR
- Area code: 020
- ISO 3166 code: GB-GRE
- ONS code: 00AL
- GSS code: E09000011
- Police: Metropolitan Police
- Website: www.royalgreenwich.gov.uk

The Royal Borough of Greenwich (/ˈɡrɛnɪtʃ/, /ˈɡrɪnɪdʒ/, /ˈɡrɪnɪtʃ/ or /ˈɡrɛnɪdʒ/) is a London borough in southeast Greater London, England. It forms part of Inner London. The London Borough of Greenwich was formed in 1965 by the London Government Act 1963. The new borough covered the former area of the Metropolitan Borough of Greenwich and most of the Metropolitan Borough of Woolwich to the east. The local council is Greenwich London Borough Council which meets in Woolwich Town Hall.

The Royal Borough of Greenwich is a large borough covering almost 50 km², approximately 19.3 miles, and containing a broad mix of historic, suburban, and rapidly redeveloping districts. It includes the Greenwich Town and Park, the site of the UNESCO World Heritage Site of Maritime Greenwich which encompasses the Prime Meridian, the Royal Observatory, Cutty Sark, and the former Royal Naval College. Also in the borough, Greenwich Peninsula is known for The O2 Arena and river transport links; while Eltham is home to Eltham Palace. Other major neighbourhoods within the borough are Woolwich, a historic military and industrial centre now undergoing major regeneration; Shooter's Hill, noted for Severndroog Castle; and parts of Abbey Wood and Thamesmead in the east. The borough is also home to parts of Blackheath, Lee, Kidbrooke, Charlton, Plumstead, and Avery Hill, together forming a diverse urban area ranging from significant heritage districts and established residential suburbs to large waterfront redevelopment zones along the River Thames.

To mark the Diamond Jubilee of Elizabeth II, the borough became a Royal Borough on 3 February 2012, due to its historic links with the Houses of Tudor and Stuart of the royal family. Greenwich was the seat of the Palace of Placentia which was built in the 15th century under the orders of Henry VI and Henry VII. It was the birthplace of Henry VIII, Mary I, and Elizabeth I, all of whom lived at the palace. The Queen's House was gifted to the queen consort Henrietta Maria in 1629 by Charles I. The Royal Observatory was commissioned in 1675 by Charles II.

== History ==
The area of the modern borough had historically been part of the county of Kent. From 1856 the area was governed by the Metropolitan Board of Works, which was established to provide services across the metropolis of London. In 1889 the Metropolitan Board of Works' area was made the County of London. From 1856 until 1900 the lower tier of local government within the metropolis comprised various parish vestries and district boards. In 1900 the lower tier was reorganised into metropolitan boroughs, two of which were called Greenwich and Woolwich.

The London Borough of Greenwich was created in 1965 under the London Government Act 1963. It covered the combined area of the two metropolitan boroughs of Greenwich and Woolwich, with the exception that North Woolwich, on the north side of the River Thames, went instead to the London Borough of Newham.

The name 'Charlton' was briefly considered as the name for the new borough. Greenwich Council applied for city status in 2002, but was turned down.

In 2012, to mark the Diamond Jubilee of Elizabeth II, the borough was given the additional honorific status of being a royal borough, in recognition of the area's historic links with the Royal Family and its status as home of the Prime Meridian and as a UNESCO World Heritage Site.

== Geography ==
The borough lies along the south bank of the River Thames between Deptford and Thamesmead. It has an area of 5,044 hectares. Because of the bends of the river, its waterfront is as long as 8.5 miles. Travelling south away from the waterfront, the ground rises: Shooters Hill in the east and the high ground of Blackheath in the west bookend the borough, Eltham to the south of these hills falls away slightly.

Greenwich is bounded by the London Boroughs of Bexley to the east, Bromley to the south, Lewisham to the west and across the River Thames to the north lie Tower Hamlets, Newham and Barking and Dagenham.

== Governance ==
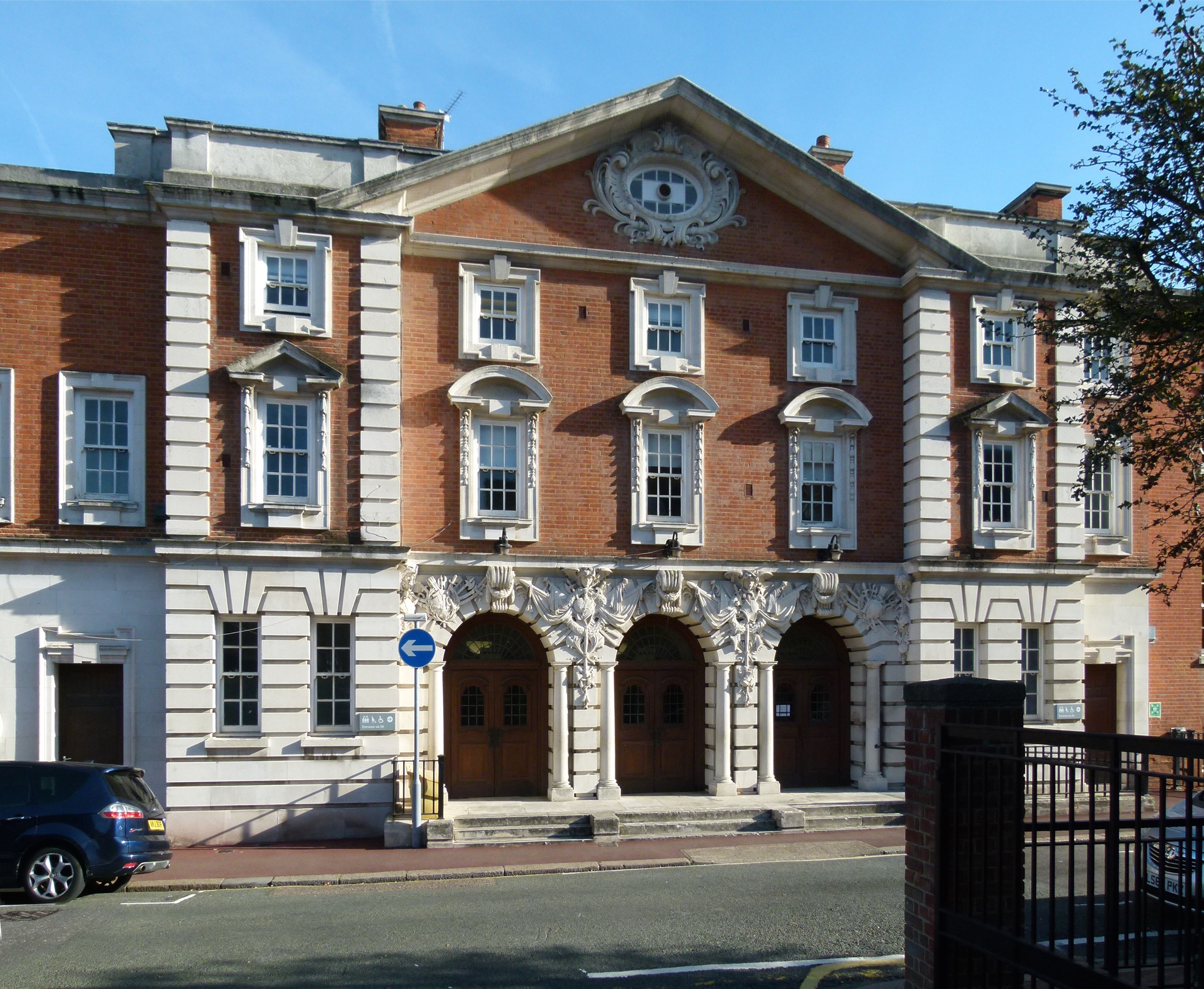
Woolwich Town Hall, the meeting place of Greenwich London Borough Council

The local authority is Greenwich Council, which meets at Woolwich Town Hall and has its main offices at the adjoining Woolwich Centre.

Shaped like an astrolabe, the 18-carat gold badge on the mayor's chain depicts the time-ball on the principal building of the old Greenwich Royal Observatory, the meridian line, and lines of latitude and longitude. The ‘time-ball’ is set with small rubies.

=== Greater London representation ===
Since 2000, for elections to the London Assembly, the borough forms part of the Greenwich and Lewisham constituency.

=== UK parliament ===
The borough contains the constituencies of:

- Eltham
- Erith and Thamesmead (shared with the London Borough of Bexley)
- Greenwich and Woolwich

All three have been represented by Labour MPs continuously since the 1997 General Election.

== Demographics ==
Population pyramid of Greenwich in 2021

The borough's population in 2011 was 254,557. 52.3% of the community defined themselves as White British. The largest minority groups represented were of Black and Asian heritage.

Approximately 44,500 international migrants arrived in the Royal Borough between the years 2001 and 2011. Of these, 25% arrived from EU member states, 24.5% arrived from central and western Africa, and 18.9% arrived from southern Asia. The most common country of birth in this period was Nigeria.

The Royal Borough in 2015 had a general fertility rate of 72.7 live births per 1,000 aged 15–44, higher than the London average of 63.9 and the England average of 62.5.

Population census
Year	Pop.	±%
1801	16,866	—
1811	20,900	+23.9%
1821	25,208	+20.6%
1831	30,113	+19.5%
1841	38,284	+27.1%
1851	52,190	+36.3%
1861	74,801	+43.3%
1871	97,413	+30.2%
1881	120,024	+23.2%
1891	174,316	+45.2%
1901	185,062	+6.2%
1911	196,471	+6.2%
1921	213,562	+8.7%
1931	232,142	+8.7%
1941	227,864	−1.8%
1951	223,674	−1.8%
1961	220,305	−1.5%
1971	216,993	−1.5%
1981	209,868	−3.3%
1991	213,488	+1.7%
2001	214,540	+0.5%
2011	254,557	+18.7%
2021	289,100	+13.6%
2024 estimate	299,528	+3.6%
Note: 2024 estimate

=== Ethnicity ===
Ethnic Group	Year											
Ethnic Group	1971 estimations		1981 estimations		1991		2001		2011		2021	
Ethnic Group	Number	%	Number	%	Number	%	Number	%	Number	%	Number	%
White: Total	–	96.3%	190,718	92%	181,193	87.3%	165,357	77.1%	159,002	62.5%	161,006	55.7%
White: British	–	–	–	–	–	–	151,291	70.6%	133,130	52.3%	119,665	41.4%
White: Irish	–	–	–	–	–	–	4,871	%	4,291	1.7%	4,230	1.5%
White: Gypsy or Irish Traveller	–	–	–	–	–	–	–	–	430	0.2%	385	0.1%
White: Roma	–	–	–	–	–	–	–	–	–	–	882	0.3%
White: Other	–	–	–	–	–	–	9,195	4.2%	21,581	8.3%	35,844	12.4%
Asian or Asian British: Total	–	–	–	–	12,765	6.14%	17,118	7.98%	29,894	11.7%	38,028	13.1%
Asian or Asian British: Indian	–	–	–	–	7,107	3.4%	9,389	%	7,836	3.1%	10,128	3.5%
Asian or Asian British: Pakistani	–	–	–	–	1,251		1,909	%	2,594	1.0%	3,538	1.2%
Asian or Asian British: Bangladeshi	–	–	–	–	381		1,236	%	1,645	0.6%	2,395	0.8%
Asian or Asian British: Chinese	–	–	–	–	1,681		2,540	%	5,061	2.0%	7,125	2.5%
Asian or Asian British: Other Asian	–	–	–	–	2,345		2,044	%	12,758	5.0%	14,842	5.1%
Black or Black British: Total	–	–	–	–	11,119	5.35%	23,787	11.1%	48,655	19.1%	60,602	21%
Black or Black British: African	–	–	–	–	3,903	1.87%	15,312	7.3%	35,164	13.8%	44,185	15.3%
Black or Black British: Caribbean	–	–	–	–	5,148	2.47%	6,782	%	8,051	3.2%	8,724	3.0%
Black or Black British: Other Black	–	–	–	–	2,068		1,693	%	5,440	2.1%	7,693	2.7%
Mixed or British Mixed: Total	–	–	–	–	–	–	5,850	2.7%	12,274	4.8%	17,297	6%
Mixed: White and Black Caribbean	–	–	–	–	–	–	2,175	%	4,011	1.6%	5,142	1.8%
Mixed: White and Black African	–	–	–	–	–	–	933	%	2,699	1.1%	3,302	1.1%
Mixed: White and Asian	–	–	–	–	–	–	1,353	%	2,361	0.9%	3,491	1.2%
Mixed: Other Mixed	–	–	–	–	–	–	1,389	%	3,203	1.3%	5,362	1.9%
Other: Total	–	–	–	–	2573	1.23%	2,378	1.1%	4,732	1.9%	12,132	4.2%
Other: Arab	–	–	–	–	–	–	–	–	1,069	0.4%	1,462	0.5%
Other: Any other ethnic group	–	–	–	–	2573	1.23%	2,378	1.1%	3,663	1.4%	10,670	3.7%
Ethnic minority: Total	–	3.7%	16,519	8%	26,457	12.74%	49,133	22.29%	95,555	37.5%	128,059	44.3%
Total	–	100%	207,237	100%	207,650	100%	214,490	100.00%	254,557	100.00%	289,065	100%

=== Immigration ===
This list includes top-15 sources of immigration to Borough of Greenwich for 2021 census:

#	Country	Number
1	Nigeria	14,357
2	Nepal	5,963
3	India	5,746
4	Romania	4,812
5	Poland	3,449
6	Italy	3,065
7	China	2,818
8	Lithuania	2,744
9	Ghana	2,730
10	Ireland	2,723
11	Bulgaria	2,225
12	Somalia	2,073
13	Jamaica	2,047
14	France	1,959
15	Vietnam	1,908

=== Landmarks ===
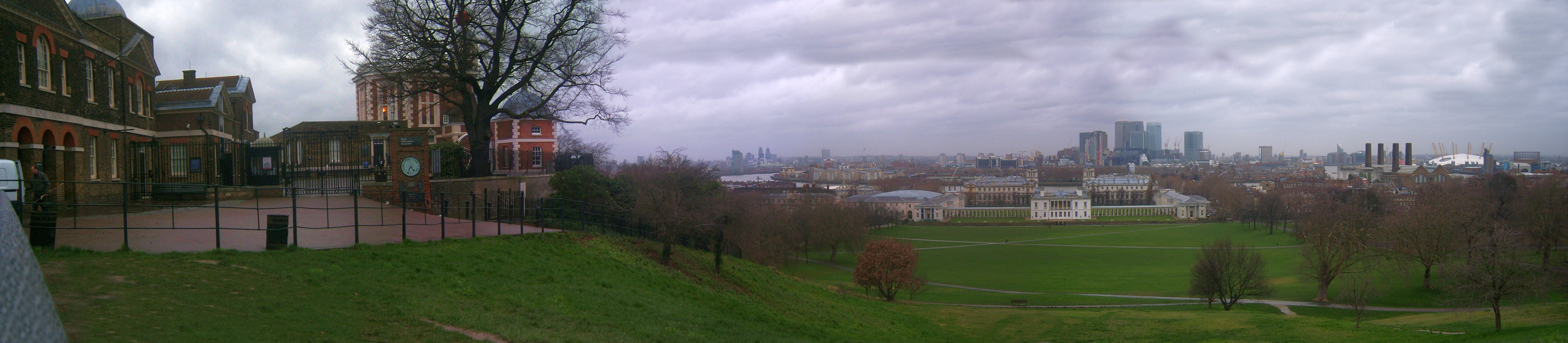
The Royal Observatory at left and the Queen's House right of centre

Central Greenwich Town contains a UNESCO World Heritage Site centred on Christopher Wren's Royal Naval College and the Old Royal Observatory.

== Education ==
=== Further education ===
Greenwich Community College is the main publicly funded provider of further education in the borough, offering a range of academic and vocational courses and qualifications. Anglian College London is a private college offering further and higher education courses to students from around London and overseas. In September 2013, The Royal Borough of Greenwich Equestrian Centre – a partnership between Hadlow College and the Royal Borough of Greenwich – opened. At present it offers Level 1 and Level 2 qualifications in horse care, as well as a range of part-time qualifications and a BSc (Hons) degree in Equine Sports Therapy and Rehabilitation.

=== Universities ===
The University of Greenwich main campus is located in the distinctive buildings of the former Royal Naval College. There is a further campus of the university at Avery Hill in Eltham, and also, outside the borough, in Medway. The Faculty of Music of Trinity Laban Conservatoire of Music and Dance (formerly known as Trinity College of Music) is also housed in the buildings of the former Greenwich Hospital. Ravensbourne University opened its new campus in September 2010 and is located next to The O2 on Greenwich Peninsula.

== Sport within the borough ==
Greenwich Council owns many sports centres and these are operated by Greenwich Leisure Limited (GLL). They also run an outdoor swimming pool, Charlton Lido.

The largest football club in the borough is Charlton Athletic F.C., a professional club playing in the EFL Championship, There are three non-League football clubs, Bridon Ropes F.C. and Meridian F.C., who both play in Charlton at Meridian Sports & Social Club and Cray Valley Paper Mills F.C. who play in Eltham at Badgers Sports Ground. There are several rugby clubs, most notably Blackheath F.C., who played at Rectory Field for 158 years, moving to Eltham in 2016. Blackheath Cricket Club still plays at Rectory Field.

Greenwich was one of the five host boroughs for the 2012 Summer Olympics and hosted 34 events in nine sports at three venues across the borough. Greenwich Park hosted equestrian events and modern pentathlon; the Royal Artillery Barracks in Woolwich hosted shooting events; and The O2 arena hosted gymnastics and basketball finals.

== Transport ==
=== River crossings ===
There are foot tunnels under the River Thames between Greenwich and Island Gardens in the London Borough of Tower Hamlets and between Woolwich and North Woolwich in the London Borough of Newham. The Woolwich Ferry takes vehicle traffic and links the North Circular Road to the South Circular Road which runs through the borough. A cable car crossing linking Greenwich Peninsula to the Royal Docks opened on 28 June 2012.

==== River transport ====
The Thames Clippers commuter ferry service runs from Woolwich to Canary Wharf and the City.

=== Railway stations ===
- Abbey Wood
- Blackheath
- Charlton
- Eltham
- Greenwich
- Kidbrooke
- Maze Hill
- Mottingham
- New Eltham
- Plumstead
- Westcombe Park
- Woolwich
- Woolwich Arsenal
- Woolwich Dockyard

All stations except Woolwich are served by Southeastern. Woolwich is served by the Elizabeth line. Abbey Wood is served by both.

=== Tube/DLR stations ===
The only London Underground station in the borough is North Greenwich on the Jubilee line. It was opened in 1999 and it is close to the Millennium Dome, which is now The O_{2}. The DLR serves Greenwich more extensively and a list of the stations is below:

- Cutty Sark (DLR)
- Deptford Bridge (DLR)
- Elverson Road (DLR)
- Greenwich (DLR)
- Woolwich Arsenal (DLR)

=== Travel to work ===
In March 2011, the main forms of transport that residents used to travel to work were driving a car or van, 17.5% of all residents aged 16–74; train, 10.2%; bus, minibus or coach, 10.2%; underground, metro, light rail, tram, 9.7%; on foot, 4.1%; work mainly at or from home, 2.5%; and bicycle, 1.5%.

== Economy ==
=== Tourism ===
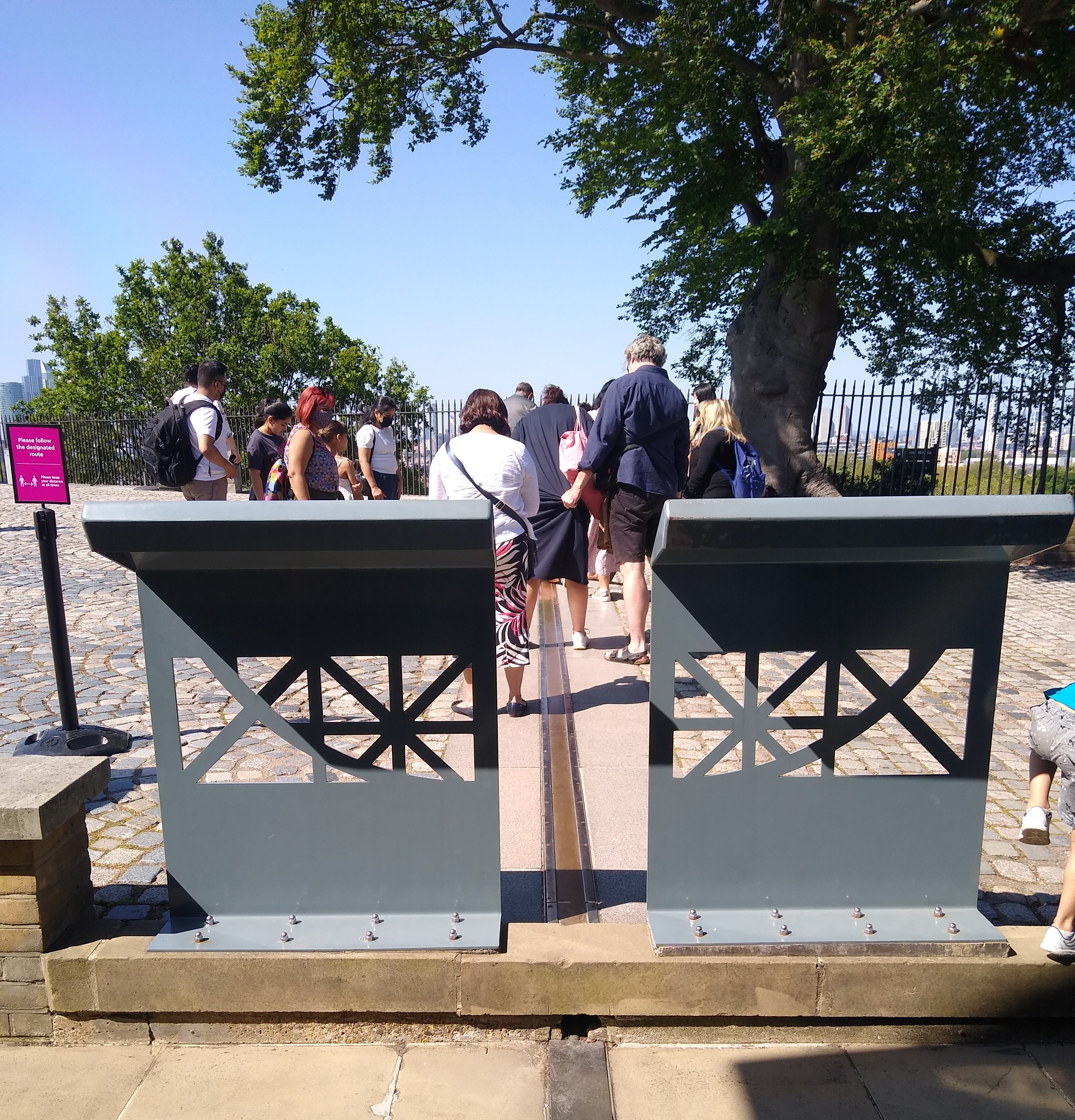
Tourists at the Prime Meridian, Greenwich Observatory

Tourism is becoming an increasingly important factor in Greenwich's economy. In 2015, 18.5 million people were expected to visit the borough for a day or more, generating over £1.2 billion; this figure was expected to increase by more than 25% by 2018. Evidence of the tourism boom included the construction of a 452-room InterContinental Hotel near the O2 Arena (opening in 2015). Apart from the many museums and historic buildings in Greenwich town and Greenwich Park, the main tourist attractions are the Cutty Sark, The O2 Arena, the London Cable Car, Eltham Palace (which expected over 100,000 visitors in 2015), Charlton House and the Thames Barrier. In addition, the Royal Arsenal in Woolwich is starting to promote itself as a tourist attraction.

== Places ==
=== Parks and open spaces ===
The borough contains the Greenwich Royal Park. A small part of the Metropolitan Green Belt is within the borough.

=== Entertainment district ===
The O2 (formerly the Millennium Dome) is located on the Greenwich Peninsula. It includes an indoor arena, a music club, a Cineworld cinema, an exhibition space, piazzas, bars, and restaurants.

== Religion ==
The following table shows the religious identity of residents residing in Greenwich according to the 2021 census.

Religion	2021	
Religion	Number	%
Christian	129,112	44.7
Muslim	24,715	8.5
Jewish	603	0.2
Hindu	11,647	4.0
Sikh	3,229	1.1
Buddhism	5,034	1.7
Other religion	1,802	0.6
No religion	94,208	32.7
Religion not stated	18,716	6.5
Total	289,068	100.0

== Coat of arms ==
Arms were originally granted to the London Borough by letters patent dated 1 October 1965. Although much of the 1965 design has been retained, the arms have been altered in 2012 by the addition of a representation of the Thames. In addition a crest and supporters were added to the arms.

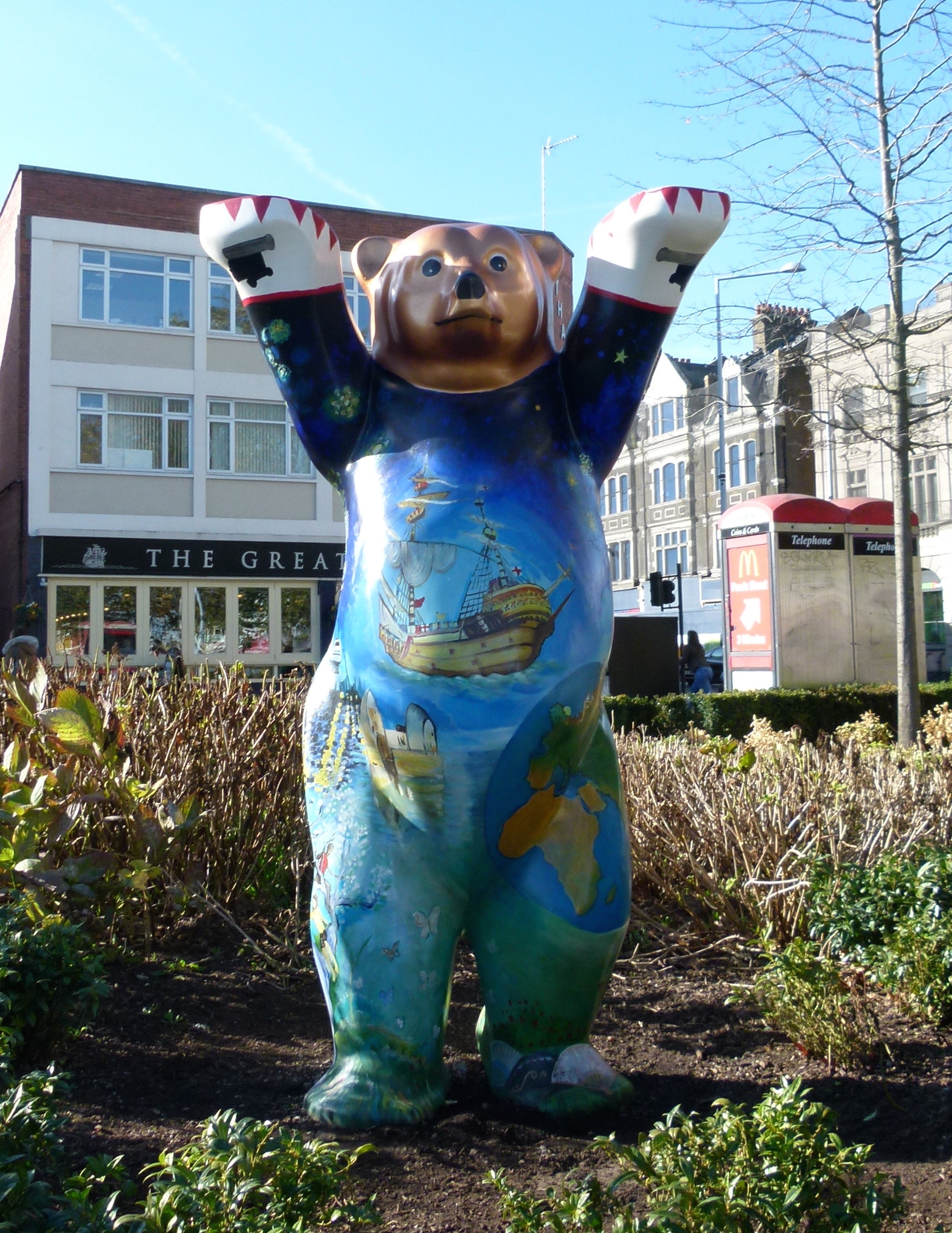
The Woolwich Buddy Bear

== Twinning ==
The Royal Borough of Greenwich is twinned with:

- Reinickendorf, Berlin, Germany (since 1965). The initiative of the twinning with this Berlin borough dates from the times of the Metropolitan Borough of Woolwich. A London telephone box and a red pillar box beside Lake Tegel were gifted by Greenwich borough. A Berlin Buddy Bear in General Gordon Square (Woolwich) commemorates the 50th anniversary of the twinning.
- Maribor, Slovenia (since 1966). The 50th anniversary of the town twinning with Slovenia's second largest city was celebrated with a ballet performance in Woolwich Town Hall and the revealing of a plaque in the renamed Maribor Park in the Royal Arsenal.
- Tema, Ghana (since 2000). The town twinning with Tema has led to the opening of Tema's first Information Technology Centre (by the Duke of Edinburgh in 2000), the gifting of a mobile ICT learning centre to Tema (2005), the shipping of a converted Greenwich council passenger services bus, packed with books for school libraries and second-hand computers, as well as regular youth exchanges between Greenwich and Tema.

== See also ==
- Greenwich parks and open spaces
- Grade I and II* listed buildings in the Royal Borough of Greenwich
- List of public art in the Royal Borough of Greenwich
- Greenwich Heritage Centre
- University of Greenwich
