= Parks and open spaces in the Royal Borough of Greenwich =

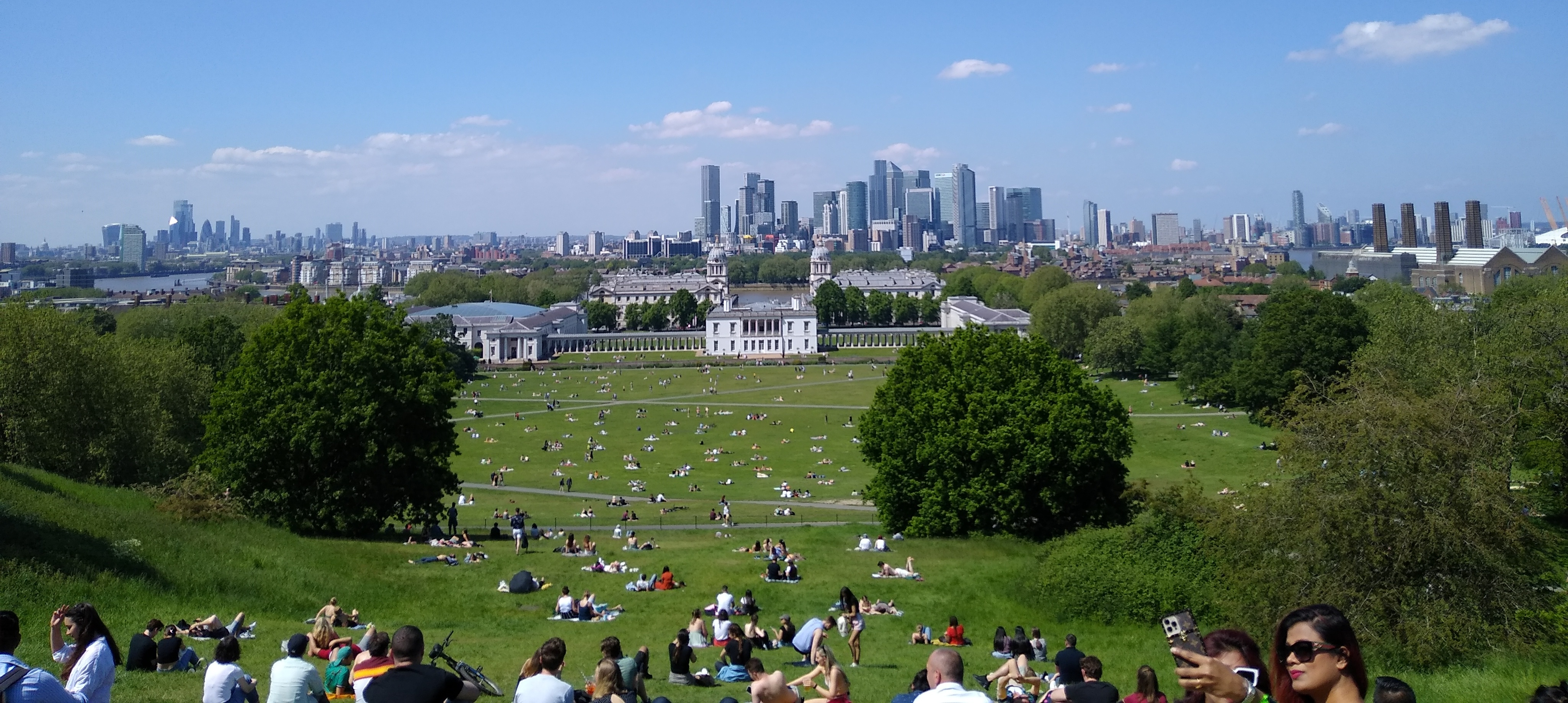
Greenwich Park

The Royal Borough of Greenwich has over fifty parks and open spaces within its boundaries. They include:

- Abbey Wood Park
- Avery Hill Park
- Birchmere Park
- Bostall Heath and Woods
- Blackheath
- Charlton Park
- Eaglesfield Park
- East Greenwich Pleasaunce
- Eltham Common
- Eltham Park north & south
- Falconwood Field
- Fairy Hill
- Greenwich Park
- Horn Park
- Kidbrooke Green Park
- Maribor Park, formerly Royal Arsenal Gardens
- Maryon Park in Charlton
- Maryon Wilson Park in Charlton
- Oxleas Wood and adjoining Oxleas Meadow, Castle Wood, Jack Wood and Shepherdleas Wood
- Plumstead Common and the adjoining Winn's Common
- Plumstead Gardens
- Queenscroft Park
- Ridgeway
- Shooters Hill
- Shrewsbury Barrow
- Shrewsbury Park, Woolwich-Plumstead
- St Mary's Garden, Woolwich
- Sutcliffe Park
- The Tarn
- Well Hall Pleasaunce
- Wellington Park, Royal Arsenal, Woolwich
- Woolwich Common which includes Repository Woods

The Green Chain, a linked series of linear and circular walks, include some of those open spaces within Greenwich. The Chain originates at three points along the River Thames and stretches to Crystal Palace Park.

Avery Hill Park is one of 11 parks throughout Greater London chosen to receive money for redevelopment by a public vote. The park received £400,000 towards better footpaths, more lighting, refurbished public toilets and new play areas for children.

== Riverside ==
Greenwich is a riverside borough, and one of the largest open spaces is the Thames itself, forming the northern boundary of the borough. A sign posted riverside trail forms a walkway for both pedestrians and cyclists.

== Local nature reserves ==
Local nature reserves in the borough are: Gilbert's Pit, Maryon Park, Maryon Wilson Park, Oxleas Wood and Sutcliffe Park.
