= South East London Green Chain =

Linked open spaces in London, England

Coordinates: 51.47°N 0.01°E

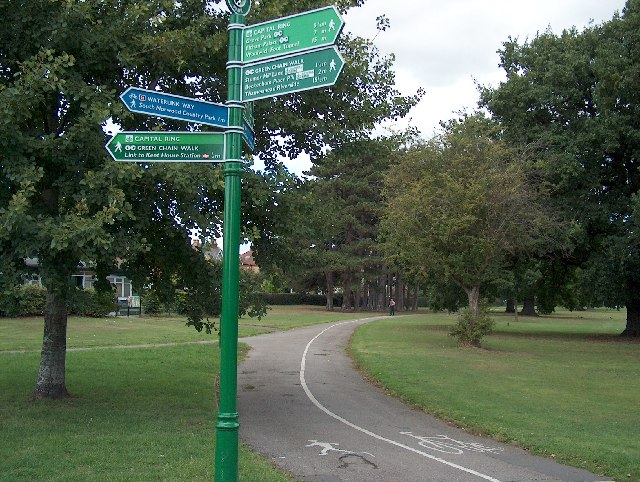
Green Chain Walk signs in Beckenham, Cator Park

The South East London Green Chain, also known as the Green Chain Walk, is a linked system of open spaces between the River Thames and Crystal Palace Park in London, England. In 1977 four London boroughs and the Greater London Council created this Green Chain of 300 open spaces to protect them from building activity. The four London boroughs are Bexley, Bromley, Lewisham and Greenwich. More recently it has been extended to include sections in Southwark. Many parts of the system are also part of the Capital Ring route.

The system begins at three places on the River Thames: Thames Barrier, Thamesmead, and the riverside at Erith. There are various circular walks along the route, and there is an offshoot from the main route to Chislehurst; and the next section reaches Crystal Palace via Bromley. From there it goes north with branches to Dulwich and Nunhead.

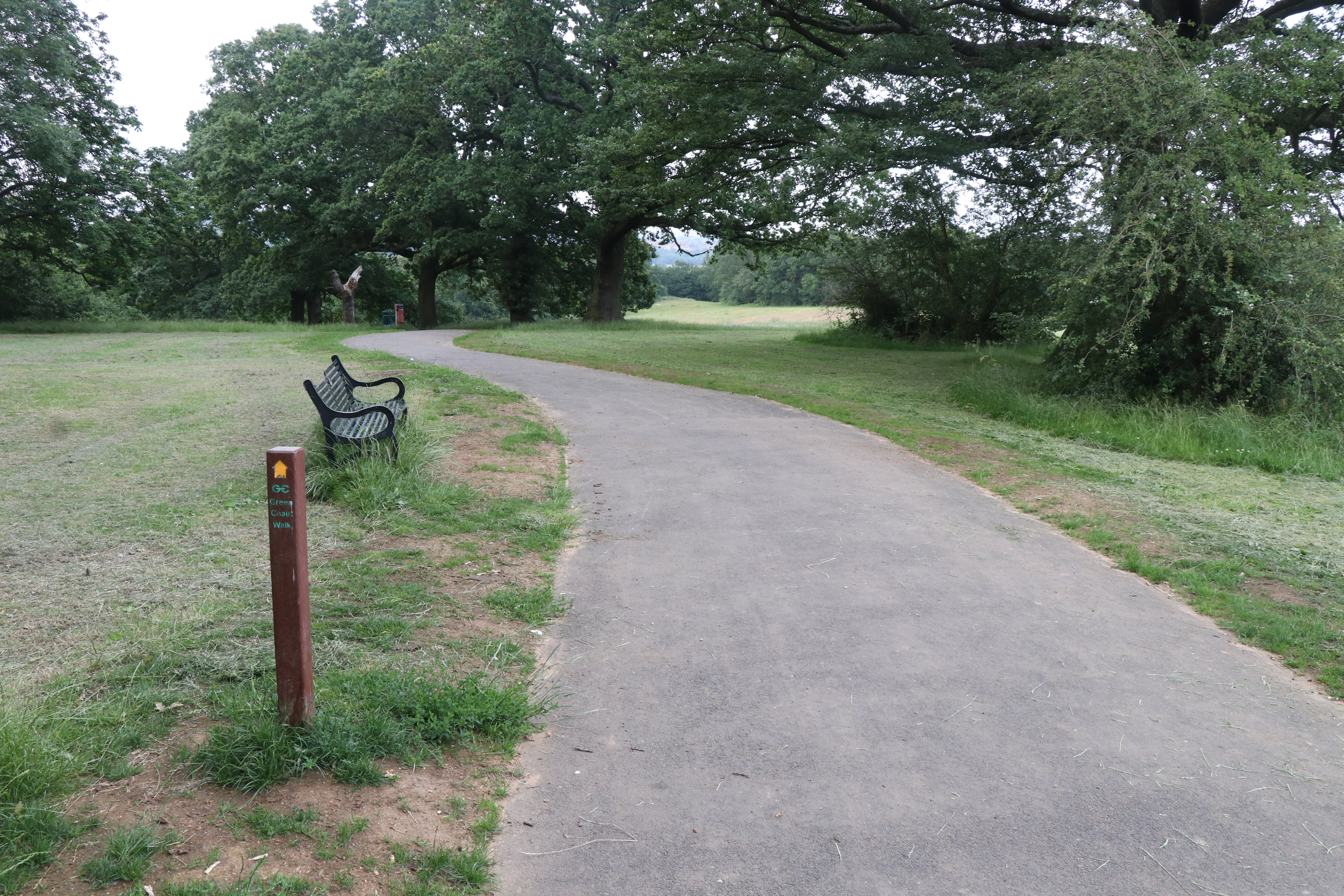
Shrewsbury Park, with Green Chain Walk marker post

The major open spaces in the Chain are:

- Lesnes Abbey
- Bostall Heath and Woods
- Parks in Charlton including Maryon Park, Maryon Wilson Park and Charlton Park
- Woolwich Common
- Plumstead Common
- Shooters Hill area, including Shrewsbury Park, Eaglesfield Park, Oxleas Wood and several other woods and open spaces
- Eltham Park and Common
- Eltham Palace
- Avery Hill Park
- The Tarn, bird sanctuary and garden with lake and woodland in Mottingham.
- Grove Park Nature Reserve
- Chinbrook Meadows
- Elmstead Wood
- Beckenham Place Park
- Sundridge Park near Bromley
- Chislehurst Common
- Crystal Palace Park

The complete list and the routes are to be found on TfL's Walk London site.

== See also ==
- Greenway (landscape)
- Linear park
- Trail
- Walking in London
