= Hanging Wood =

Hanging Wood may refer to:

- Hanging Wood, South Yorkshire
- Hanging Wood, London
