= J. J. Sexby =

Chief Officer for Parks for the London County Council

John James Sexby VD (known as JJ Sexby) (15 July 1847 – 10 May 1924) was a British civil servant who served as the first Chief Officer for Parks for the London County Council from 1892 to 1909, and was responsible for the creation of many of London's late Victorian and Edwardian parks. He is invariably described as Lt-Col JJ Sexby, although all of his military service was in the Volunteer Force (the precursor to the Territorial Army) and Lt-Col was an honorary title as his substantive rank was that of a Major.

== Early life ==
Sexby was born in Lambeth, then in Surrey, in 1847, the son of John Sexby, a builder, and his wife Mary Susannah Hobden. He was baptised on 15 Aug 1847 at St Mary-at-Lambeth (somewhat appropriately, now the Garden Museum), then the parish church of Lambeth adjacent to Lambeth Palace. The address in the baptism register is 62 Vauxhall Walk; his father’s occupation is given as carpenter.

His father died aged 48 in 1866, his mother the following year aged 46. He then lived with an aunt. When letters of administration were granted to Sexby in 1868 for his mother's personal estate and effects, his address was given as 46 Thorne Road, South Lambeth.

== Military service ==
In 1865 Sexby was appointed as Honorary Assistant-Quartermaster in the 19th Surrey Rifle Volunteer Corps. (In that year the 19th Surrey Rifle Volunteer Corps acquired the Braganza Street drill hall, a short distance from Thorne Road.) He was made a Second Lieutenant in 1878 and Lieutenant the following year. In 1881 he was made a captain. By then the 19th Surrey Corps was called the 8th Surrey Corps. In 1886 he was made a Major. He was awarded the Volunteer Officers' Decoration in 1892. In 1895 he was made an Honorary Lieutenant-Colonel. He resigned from the Volunteer Corps in 1897; on retirement he was entitled to retain his honorary rank. The 19th Surrey Rifle Volunteer Corps was renamed the 8th Surrey Rifle Volunteer Corps and then, pursuant to the Cardwell Reforms and Childers Reforms, became the 4th Volunteer Battalion, Queen's (Royal West Surrey) Regiment in 1883, and then the 24th (County of London) Battalion (The Queen’s) in 1908.

== Surveyor ==
In the 1871 and 1881 censuses Sexby's occupation is given as surveyor. In around 1870 Sexby became a surveyor in the Superintending Architect's department of the Metropolitan Board of Works. In 1880 he qualified as a chartered surveyor. Sexby's earliest park designs were undertaken during his time with the MBW, including Ravenscourt Park, which was laid out in 1888.

== LCC Chief Officer for Parks ==
By the late 1880s, the MBW had been mired in a number of corruption scandals and, in 1889, it was replaced by the London County Council as a result of the Local Government Act 1888. The LCC established a Parks Department, led by four dedicated parks officers: a Principal Officer, a Chief Surveyor, a Forester and a Gardener. Sexby was appointed as the Chief Surveyor. By 1892 a Chief Officer for Parks position had been created and Sexby was appointed to the role; he had a staff of a thousand.

In order of opening, Sexby's parks include:

- Ravenscourt Park, opened at the end of the MBW era in 1888 on the site of a former estate, the grounds of which had been laid out by Humphry Repton. Sexby's design included an Old English Garden, later renamed the Scented Garden and now known as the Walled Garden.
- Dulwich Park, acquired by the MBW in 1885 and originally laid out by Charles Barry, and refined by Sexby as one of his earliest LCC projects in 1890. Sexby was responsible for the design of the American Gardens. The rhododendrons and azaleas in the American Gardens were popular, and Queen Mary regularly visited them in season.
- Maryon Park was presented to the LCC in 1890 by the owners of the estate in which it sat. It opened in 1891, with Sexby designing serpentine paths around the slopes of the hill.
- Peckham Rye Park was acquired in 1890, having previously been a farm. It was opened in 1894, Sexby having laid out an artificial lake, an American Garden, a Japanese Garden and an Old English Garden. All of these remain in existence, the Old English Garden having been renamed Sexby Garden in honour of its designer.
- Bethnal Green Gardens, laid out by Sexby in 1894–95 on the site of a public garden of 1875, in turn on the former Bethnal Green Poor's Lands.
- Hilly Fields is notable for having been preserved from development by Octavia Hill, one of the co-founders of the National Trust. The park was acquired and opened by the LCC in 1896; Sexby's design included a bandstand, since demolished.
- Deptford Park, previously a market garden, was acquired by the LCC in 1884, but not opened until 1897. Sexby was responsible for the layout of the park.
- Golders Hill Park was acquired in 1898, and opened the following year. It is on the site of a former estate, which itself had been designed at different stages by Capability Brown, Humphry Repton and Robert Marnock. Sexby's design included an Old English Garden in the former kitchen garden.
- Bromley Recreation Ground in Tower Hamlets, now known as Bob's Park, was acquired and laid out by the LCC in 1900.
- Brockwell Park, acquired piecemeal by the LCC from 1892 to 1901, following which Sexby created an Old English Garden in the walled garden of the former Brockwell Hall.
- Wandsworth Park was formerly allotment gardens. Acquired by the LCC in 1898, it was opened in 1903. Sexby's design included playing fields, and an ornamental garden.
- Northbrook Park was opened in 1903, and laid out by Sexby with a lake and a drinking fountain, both which no longer exist.
- Springfield Park, Hackney was acquired in 1904, and opened the following year. Sexby designed the park with an emphasis on paths and woodland. These survive, along with a bandstand and bowling green.
- Ruskin Park was acquired in 1904, and opened in 1907. Sexby's design included an Old English Garden, an oval duck pond, a bandstand and a bowling green. The bowling green has been replaced by a garden, but the other features remain.
- Eaglesfield Park had long been a place of public resort when it was acquired in 1907 by the Woolwich Metropolitan Borough Council. The LCC contributed half of the purchase price, and Sexby laid out the park, which was opened in 1908. Sexby's design included enhancing an existing ornamental pond. Over time this became derelict and abandoned, but was restored in 2012.

Sexby retired in 1910. In the following year's census, he is recorded as a boarder at the Haddon Hall Hydro Hotel in the spa town of Buxton; his occupation is given as 'Retired Lt-Colonel'. After that, there is no record of him until his death in 1924.

Sexby’s influence continued after his retirement. An Old English Garden was laid out in Battersea Park in 1912, soon after he retired, and in 1913 in the former walled kitchen garden at the Rookery, adjacent to Streatham Common. Kennington Park was originally opened as a park in 1854, out of the remnants of Kennington Common. Over time it was expanded, and, after the 1921 extension, an Old English Garden, in the Sexby style, was opened in 1931.

== Written works ==
The Municipal Parks, Gardens and Open Spaces of London, Elliot Stock, cheap ed., 1905

Sexby wrote a number of published works:

- The Municipal Parks, Gardens and Open Spaces of London, Elliot Stock 1898 (republished by Cambridge University Press, 2014, ISBN 9781108076135).
- Notebook of the Parks, Gardens, Recreation Grounds and Open Spaces of London, 1899.
- London Parks and Open Spaces: Notes on the Acquisition of Parks under the Control of the Council, 1906.
- History of Wandsworth Common
- History of Streatham Common
- History of Tooting Common

== Personal life ==
Sexby was a Freemason; he joined in 1897, and his occupation is given as Chief Officer for Parks, LCC.

He died in 1924, and probate was granted to William Edward Osborn. At the time of his death his address was Melbourne House, 79 Worple Road, Wimbledon, and he was described as the Late Lieut-Col John James Sexby, 4th VB Queen's Royal West Surrey Regiment, VD.

== Legacy ==
The only assessment of Sexby's contribution to London's parks and gardens was published in The London Gardener (the journal of the London Gardens Trust) in 2005 by Hazelle Jackson. Jackson's assessment of Sexby is that he had a profound influence on the style and quality of London's parks. She notes that the measure of his success is that he set standards in public park design and management worldwide that still prevail. Nevertheless, he is a shadowy figure in the annals of garden history, not even rating a mention in British Gardeners – A Biographical Dictionary. The Garden Museum's Archive produces no results when the term ‘Sexby’ is entered as a search.

The only named memorial to Sexby is his Old English Garden in Peckham Rye Park, renamed in his honour. The Old English Garden in Southwark Park was opened in 1936 and named in honour of Sexby, but in 1942 it was renamed after Ada Salter following her death that year.
