= Charlton Park, Greenwich =

Park in Greenwich, London, England

Charlton Park
- Interactive map of Charlton Park
- Type: • Public park • Urban park
- Location: Charlton, Greenwich, London, England, United Kingdom
- Coordinates: 51.4805°N 0.04392°E
- Created: 13 July 1929; 96 years ago
- Operator: Greenwich London Borough Council
- Status: Open year round
- Website: "Charlton Park" (descriptive page on Charlton Park on the Greenwich London Borough Council's official website)

Charlton Park is a public park in Charlton, in south-east London, in the Royal Borough of Greenwich. It is situated east of Charlton village and Charlton House, and south of Charlton Park Road (the B210, linking Woolwich and Blackheath). Cemetery Lane bordering Charlton cemetery lies to the east, and the park is north of the Queen Elizabeth Hospital.

== History ==
The park was part of the Charlton Manor estate. In 1607, this was acquired by Adam Newton, tutor to Prince Henry, who built Charlton House. In the 18th century (1746), John Roque's The Country Near Ten Miles Round map shows the house surrounded by formal gardens to the north, east and south, though some of these were later removed.

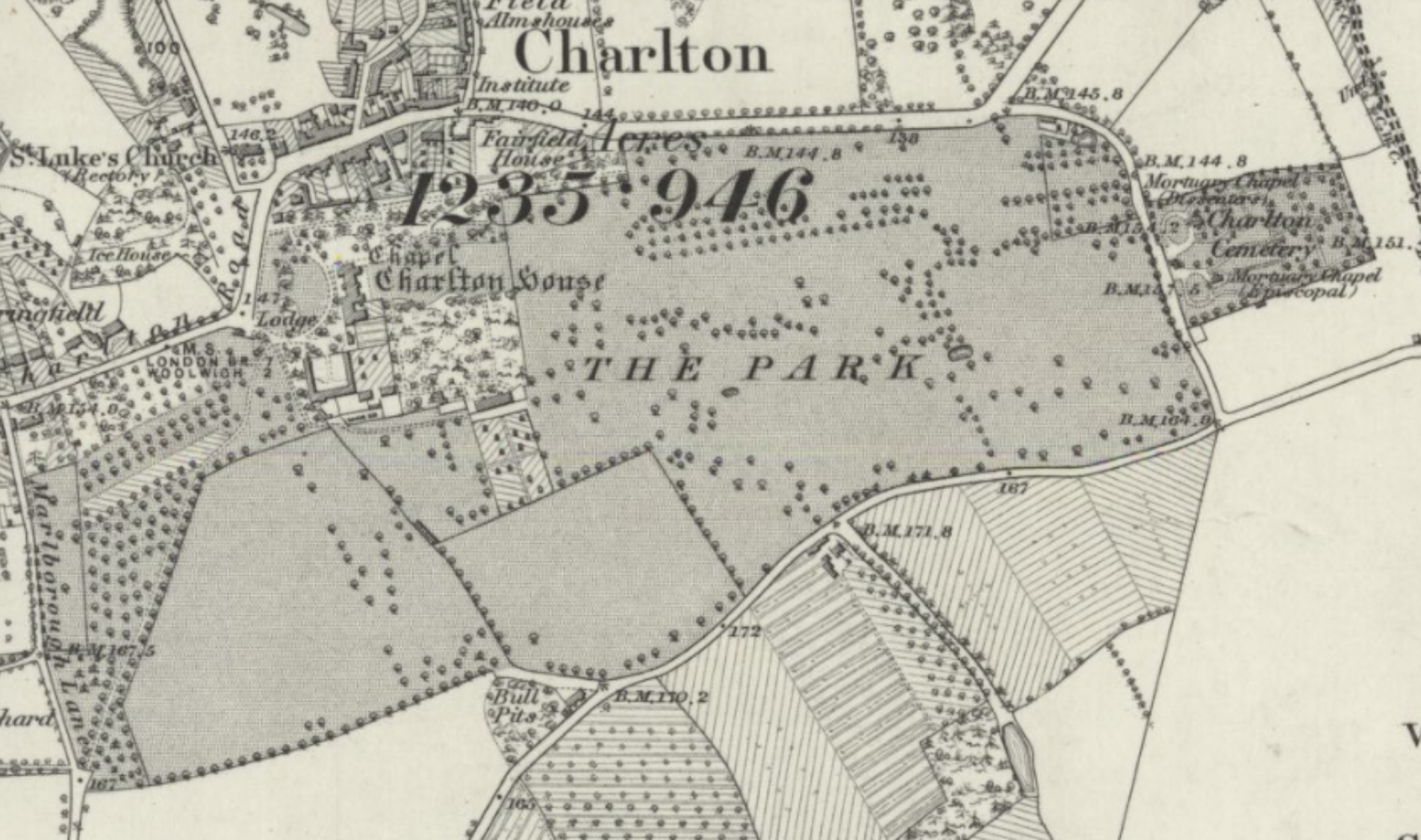
Ordnance Survey map of Charlton Park, 1870

From 1767 to 1923, the house was occupied by the Maryon-Wilson family, who gradually divested various parts of their estate, including woodland that today forms Maryon Park, Gilbert's Pit and Maryon-Wilson Park, and land now used for Charlton Cemetery. In 1898, Sir Spencer Maryon-Wilson laid out tennis courts, croquet lawns and a polo field in the remaining grounds, parts of which were used by the Royal Artillery during World War I. In 1925, the house and 108 acres of grounds were bought by the Metropolitan Borough of Greenwich, with 43 acres allocated for sports provision.

The park, then with 18 grass tennis courts, putting green, an athletic area with cinder running track, and football and cricket pitches, was officially opened on 13 July 1929, with changing facilities added the following year. During World War II, large areas were set aside to grow food and to accommodate temporary buildings for bombed out families. The running track, updated in 1969, was removed around 2000.

== Facilities ==
The park has a floodlit all-weather sports pitch, a cricket pitch, and several grass pitches for football and rugby. It also features an 'adiZone' outdoor gym (provided by Adidas to host boroughs of the 2012 Summer Olympics) a skatepark, a playground with integrated access for wheelchair users including wheelchair accessible parking and a small cafe with outdoor seating. Adjacent to the playground is a Riding for the Disabled Association facility. The park also has toilet facilities and another small cafe, the Old Cottage Coffee Shop Cafe (there are also toilets and a cafeteria in Charlton House). In October 2021, Charlton park hosted its first weekly parkrun.

The park is also used for occasional festivals and other events; in June 2022, for example, it hosted a Platinum Picnic in the Park to mark the Queen's Platinum Jubilee.

A Japanese-style herb garden and a pond garden are provided for visitors with visual or physical disabilities. South-east of Charlton House are two walled gardens, one of which was opened in July 2006 as a Peace Garden, in conjunction with Amnesty International.

The adjacent Charlton Park Academy (a special school for students aged 11–19, with low incidence special educational needs) takes its name from the Park.

== Gallery ==
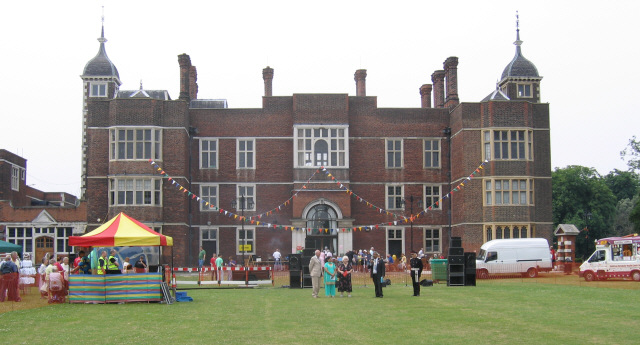
Charlton House, east side (2006)

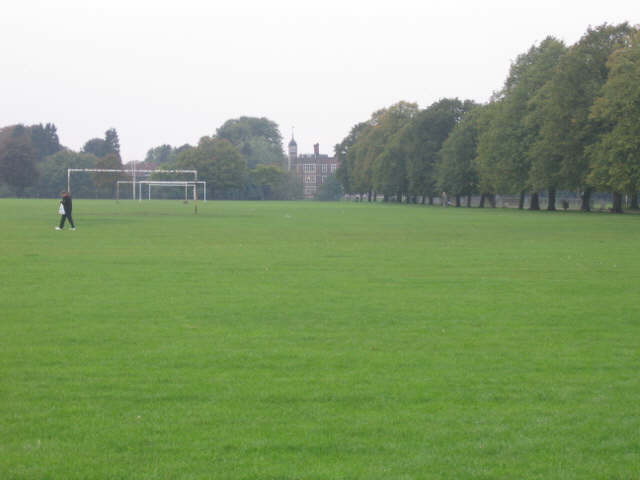
Looking west towards Charlton House (2006)

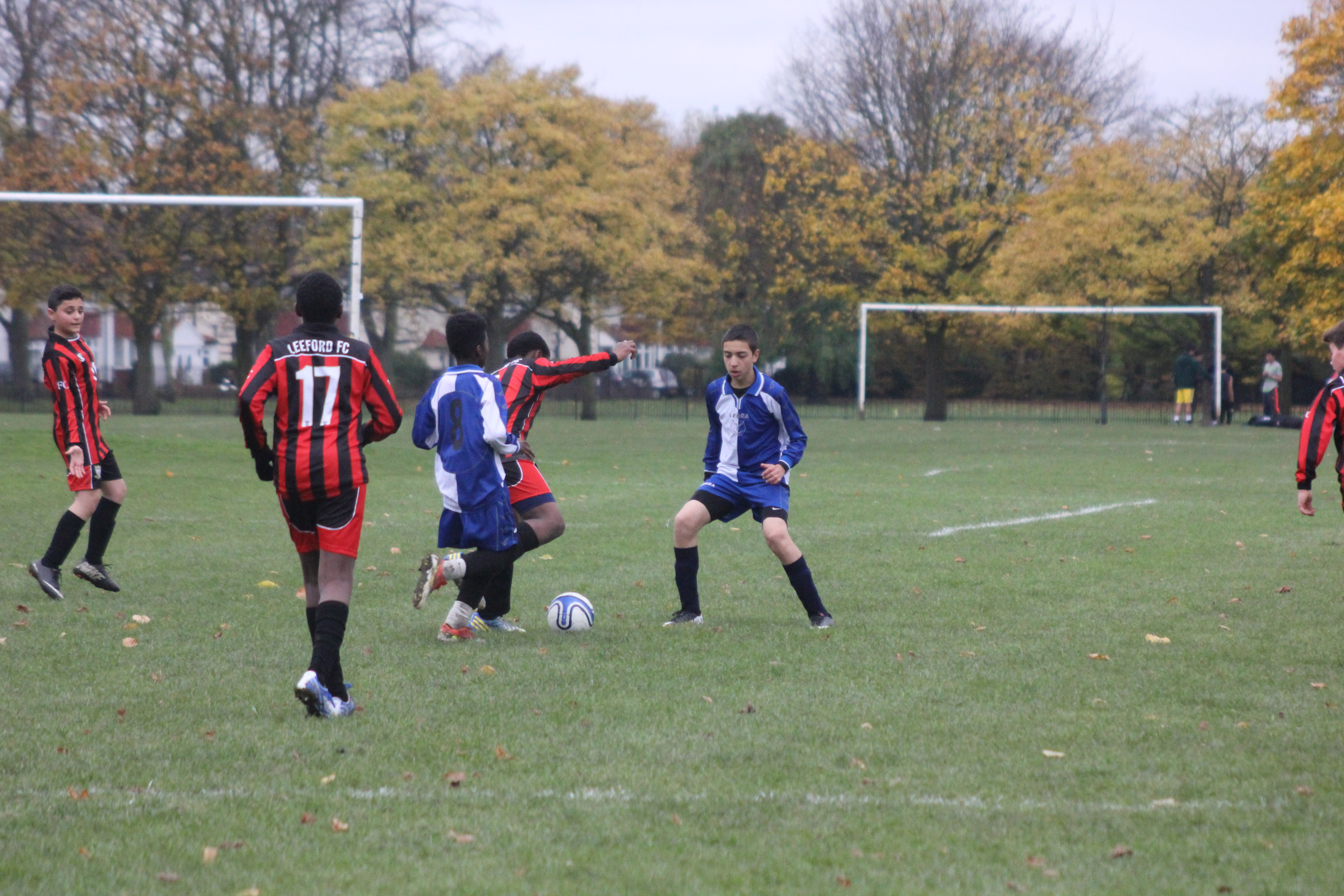
Boys play football in Charlton Park (November 2013)

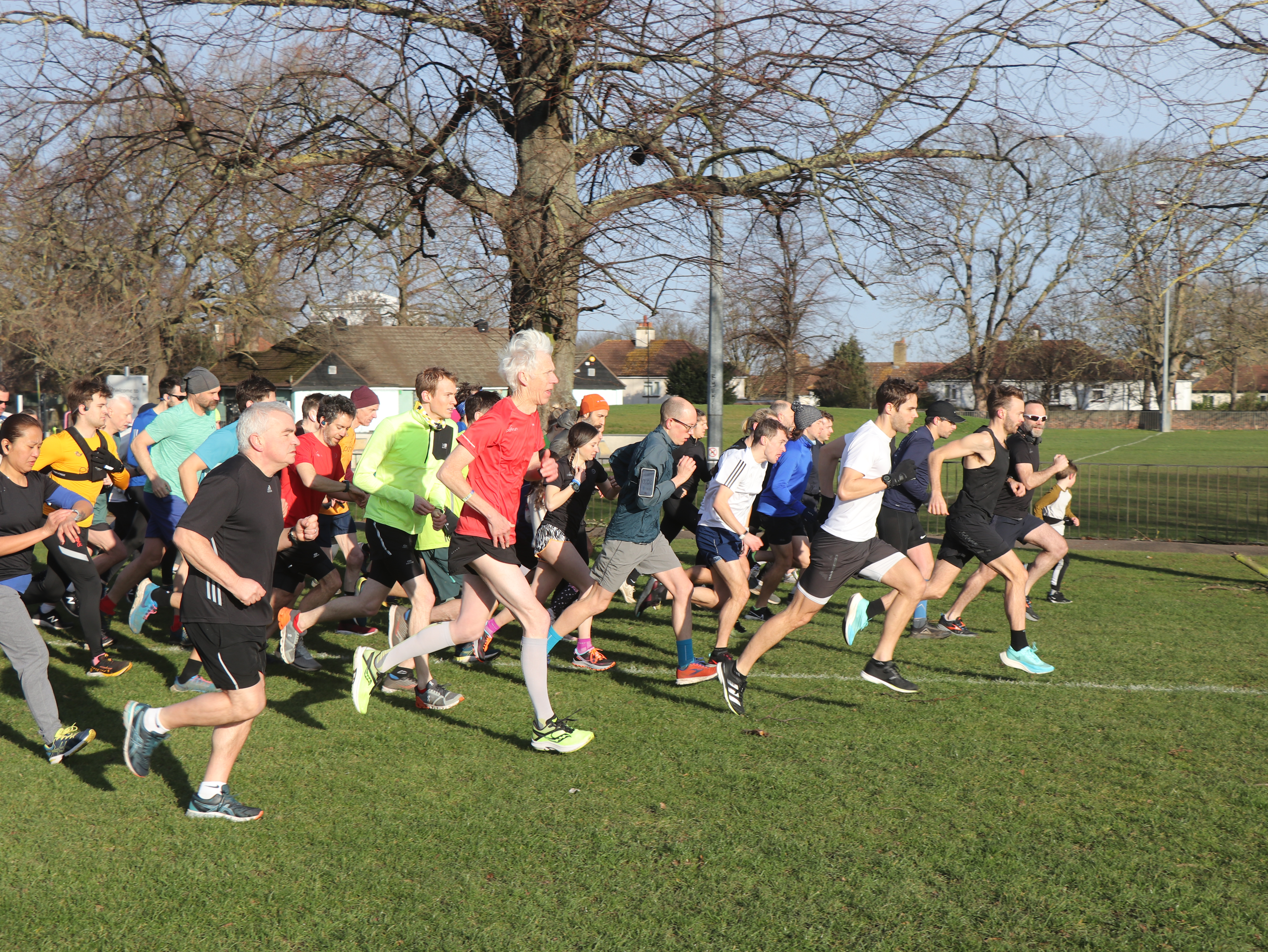
Start of a weekly Charlton parkrun (19 February 2022)
