= Deptford Park =

Park in Deptford, London, England

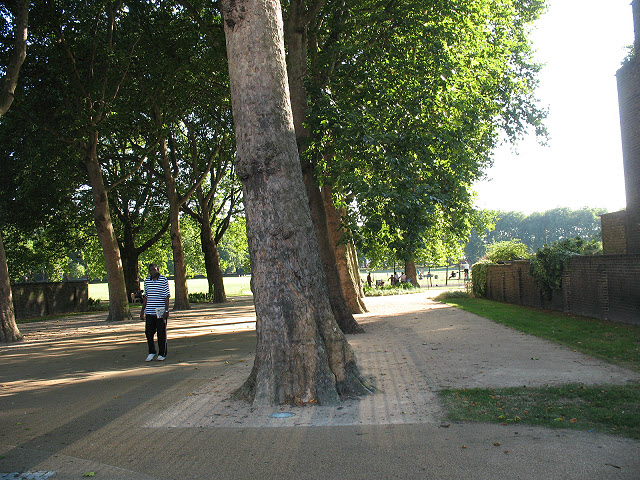
- London planes at Deptford Park
- Interactive map of Deptford Park
- Type: public park
- Location: London, England
- Coordinates: 51°29′11″N 0°02′21″W
- Area: 7.07 hectares (17 acres)
- Status: Open year round
- Website: lewisham.gov.uk

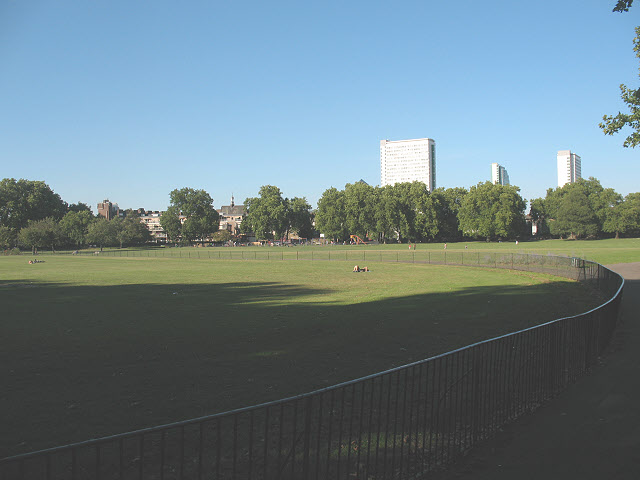
Deptford Park is a large urban park close to the River Thames

Deptford Park is a public park in Deptford south-east London. It is owned by London Borough of Lewisham.

The closest local stations are Deptford and Surrey Quays.

== History of the park ==
Deptford Park was originally a market garden belonging to the estate of the Evelyn family. Located near the River Thames, it was renowned for its onions, celery and asparagus. In 1884, London County Council bought the land for the creation of a public park. It was designed by the chief parks officer Lt Col J. J. Sexby and opened to the public in 1897.

== Park design and features ==
The park covers an area of 7.07 hectares (17 acres) and is accessed from Evelyn Street, with the entrance retaining traditional iron gates and railings and a small avenue of London planes. The original structure of the park is largely intact, with a perimeter pathway lined with further mature London planes.

Facilities include a football pitch and play area. Recent regeneration of the park has included installation of a new children’s playground and ‘The Avenue’, a redesigned entrance way leading to a formal paved area with seating. There is also now a small community orchard.

In 2008, a steel sculpture, Blue Iridescence, by the artist Heather Burrell, was installed in the park.

In 2015, a consultation was announced to put in an astroturf pitch in the South West corner of the park. This would have replaced the existing football pitch, covered up the old athletics tracks and reduced the natural green space in this mid-sized park, with associated risks to local wildlife. A growing and increasingly vocal residents' community opposed the installation, and the Council listened to the residents by rejecting the application.

== Other local green spaces ==
The south-west corner of the park is in close proximity to railway tracks, which separate it from the small 1970s park Folkestone Gardens, approximately 0.1 miles (0 km) away. In connection with the proposed development Neptune Wharf, there are plans in place to open up the connection between Deptford Park and Folkestone Gardens, with a pedestrian walkway and cycle path underneath one of the railway arches currently blocked up, enabling safe and easy access between these two much-used green spaces where there is today only a narrow pavement through a tunnel shared between pedestrians, cyclists and cars.

Sayes Court Park, an historic garden also built on land belonging to the Evelyn family, is around 0.5 miles (1 km) away and provides access to the Thames Path. There is today no direct access from Deptford Park to the Thames Path, however Neptune Wharf developers are proposing to renovate parts of the path. Local community groups are supporting the increased use of the area to enable access between the different green spaces and the Thames Path, and working with the developers to enable a clear through route in future.

== External sources ==
- Lewisham Council Masterplan for Deptford Park
