= Folkestone Gardens (Deptford) =

Park in the London Borough of Lewisham, England

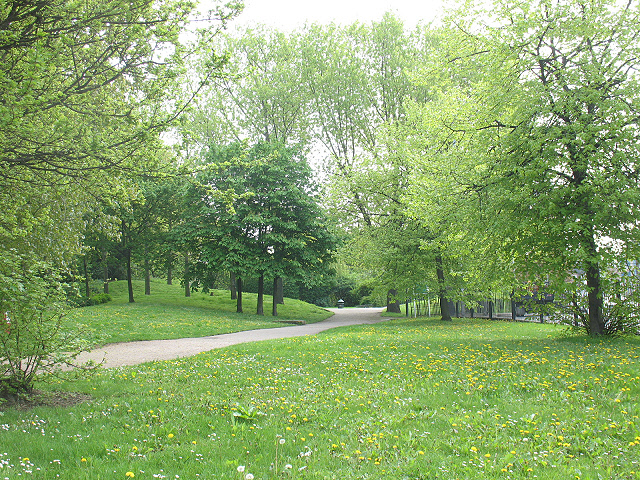
- Western end of Folkestone Gardens Stephen Craven
- Interactive map of Folkestone Gardens
- Type: public park
- Location: London, England
- Coordinates: 51°28′59″N 0°02′24″W
- Area: 2.25 hectares (6 acres)
- Open: 8am-sunset
- Status: Open year round
- Website: lewisham.gov.uk

Folkestone Gardens is a small urban park located in Deptford, south east London. Now part of the London Borough of Lewisham, it was created during the 1970s on an area badly damaged by bombs in World War II. The park was named after an estate of railway men's flats that were built in 1890 that once stood on part of the site.

The nearest bus stop is at Surrey Canal Road opposite the park. The closest Transport for London stations are at Surrey Quays, Canada Water and New Cross.

Folkestone Gardens is within 0.2 miles (0 km) of the Surrey Canal regeneration site.

== History of the site ==
Folkestone Gardens is a man-made urban park on a plot of land that was formerly high-density housing estate built in 1890. On 7 March 1945, the area was badly damaged by a V-2 rocket, resulting in the loss of 53 lives. In the late 1960s and early '70s, the area was cleared and the park was subsequently laid out over part of Folkestone Gardens and also Oareboro Road, an L-shaped street of terraced houses.

== Geography and layout ==
The park is on a narrow plot of around 2.25 hectares (6 acres). It is adjacent to Trundleys Road on the western side and Rolt Street to the south. To the north it incorporates an area that was formerly the Grand Surrey Canal. Railway lines border the northern and eastern boundaries of Folkestone Gardens. These include a viaduct of what was the London and Greenwich Railway, the first railway in London built specifically for passengers, and the first to be elevated. To the other side of the railway lines, and approximately 0.1 miles (0 km) away, is the much larger Deptford Park.

The undulating site is landscaped and includes walkways, woodland areas and a large pond on the north-western side. The pond has an island with a large weeping willow and pond-side plants, some of which were taken from surplus stock at Blackheath's's Hare and Billet pond during restoration in 1994. Other tree specimens include Lombardy poplars and a group of sycamores. The park supports a diverse range of flora and fauna for its size and location.

The Quietway 1 cycle route runs through the park.

== Facilities ==
Facilities include a children's play area, a ball court, and a new, concrete skate park. The skate park was the source of local controversy, with the Council allocating funding for the skatepark, but not the play area, despite the consultation documentation outlining that the development was to incorporate regeneration of both. A number of safety concerns with the skatepark continue to exist, such as the open pathway directly from the skate area out to the main road (as of April 2016, this has been temporarily secured with a plastic fence).

In 2025, Lewisham Council invested £700,000 from Section 106 and NCIL funds into upgrading the play facilities at Folkestone Gardens, alongside Evelyn Green and Sayes Court. The improvements include new and refurbished play equipment and a multi‑use games area, co‑designed with local children and families following community consultations.

A small, independently run restaurant and wine bar operates within the park. It has exchanged hands three times over the years, first operated under the name Festa sul Prato, then Park Cafe Hönle, and now called Sylva.
