= Eaglesfield Park =

Park in Greenwich, London, England

- Location within Royal Borough of Greenwich
- Type: Public park
- Location: London, SE18
- Coordinates: 51°28′15″N 0°04′14″E
- Area: 3.64 hectares (9.0 acres)
- Created: 1908
- Operator: Greenwich London Borough Council
- Status: Open year round
- Website: "Eaglesfield Park" (descriptive page on Eaglesfield Park at greenwich.gov.uk, the Greenwich London Borough Council's official website)

Eaglesfield Park is a public park situated close to the top of Shooter's Hill, south of Woolwich, in the Royal Borough of Greenwich in south east London.

== Overview ==
The park is in two sections divided by Eaglesfield Road. The western section is landscaped and includes a pond and a children's playground (situated in what was formerly a children's splash pool); the eastern section is a grassland meadow, and is adjacent to a golf course. The Green Chain Walk passes through the western section of the park.

Eaglesfield was purchased by Woolwich Metropolitan Borough Council in 1907, with half the funds contributed by London City Council. LCC's chief officer of parks J. J. Sexby laid out the park, which was opened in 1908. Sexby's design included enhancements to an existing ornamental pond. Over time this became derelict and abandoned, but was restored in 2012.

The park's name may derive from the two eagles depicted on the coat of arms of local 18th-century landowner John Lidgebird, or because Shooters Hill was known as a roost for eagles in medieval times.

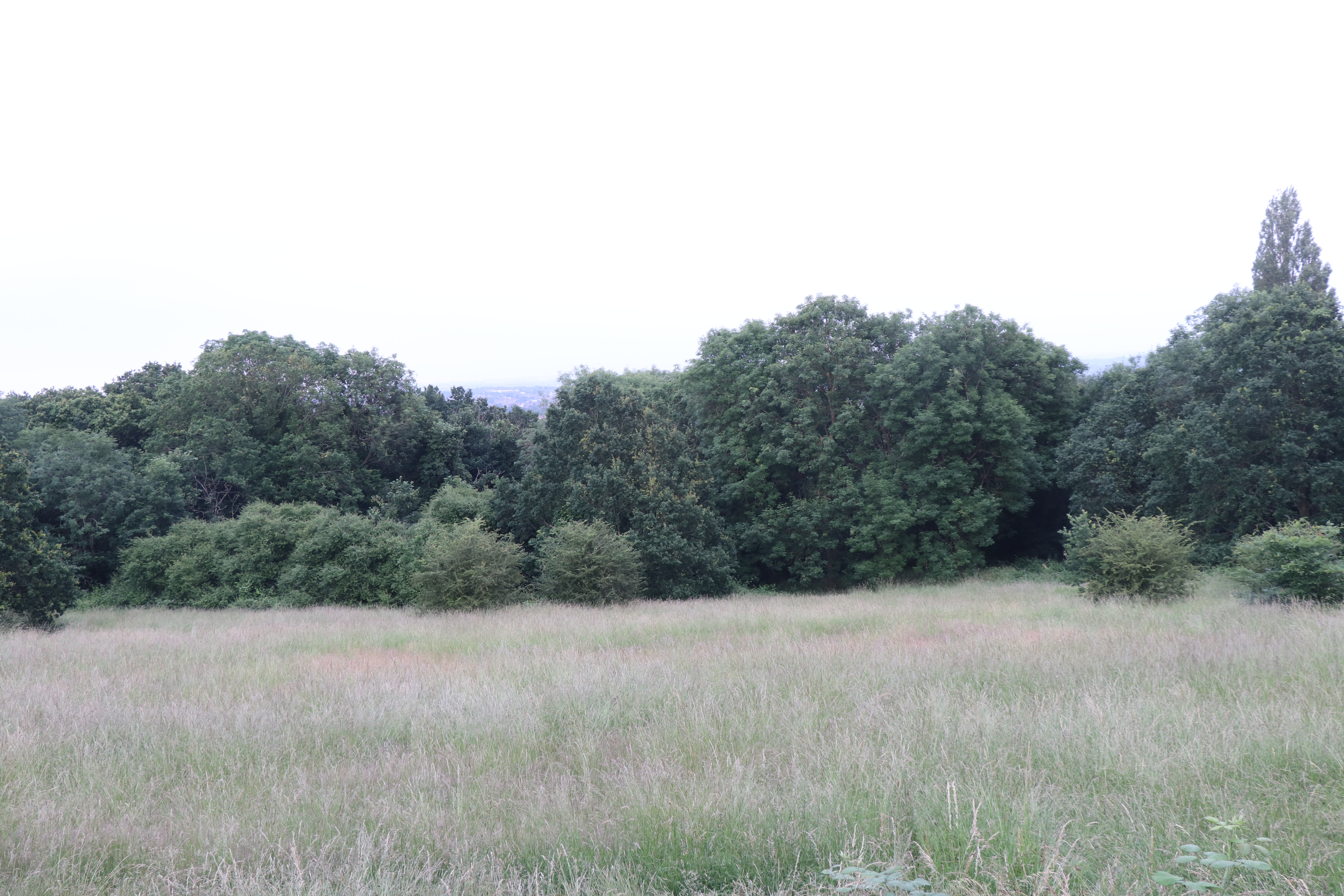
Eaglesfield Park: The Meadow

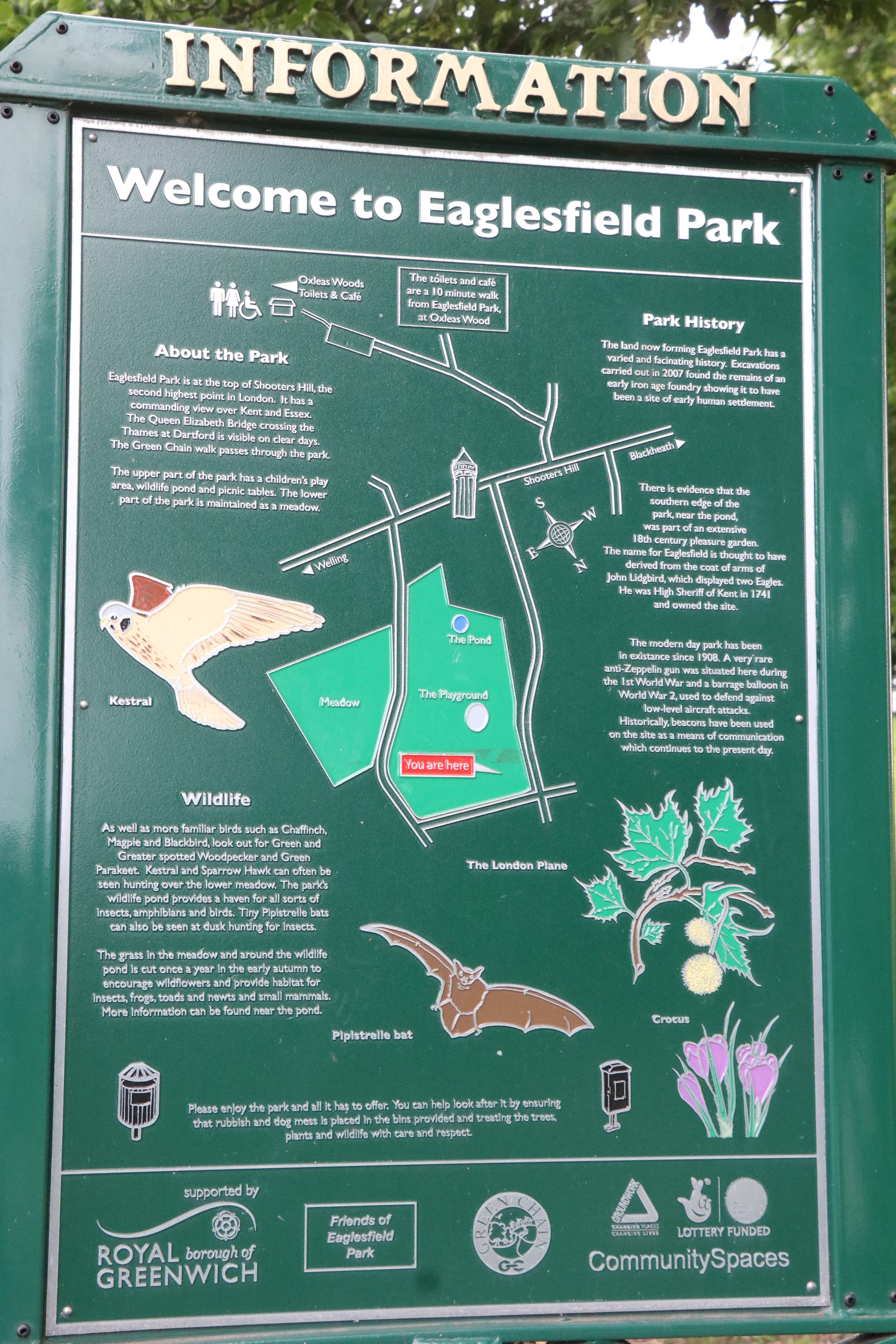
Information sign

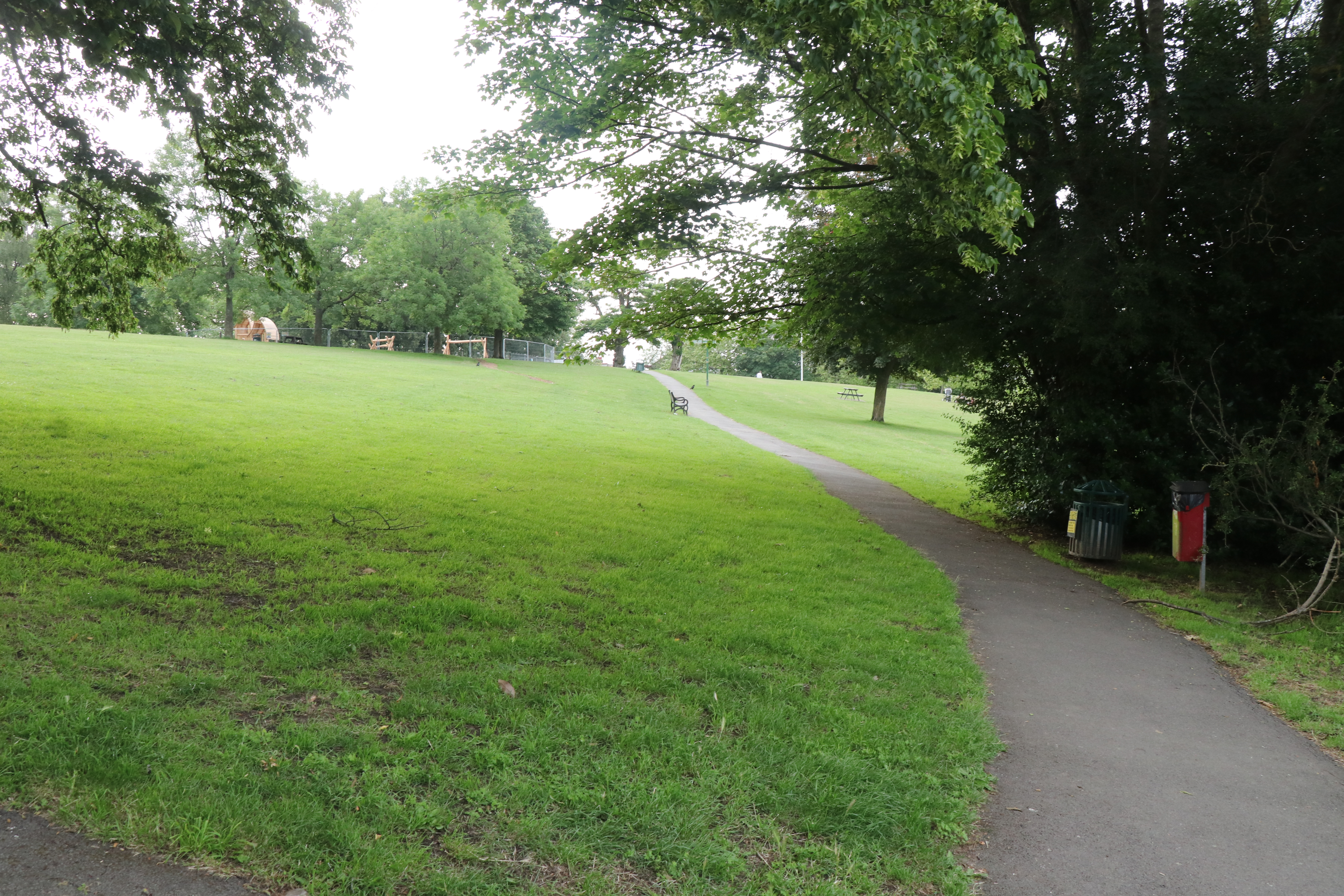
Eaglesfield Park, west of Eaglesfield Road

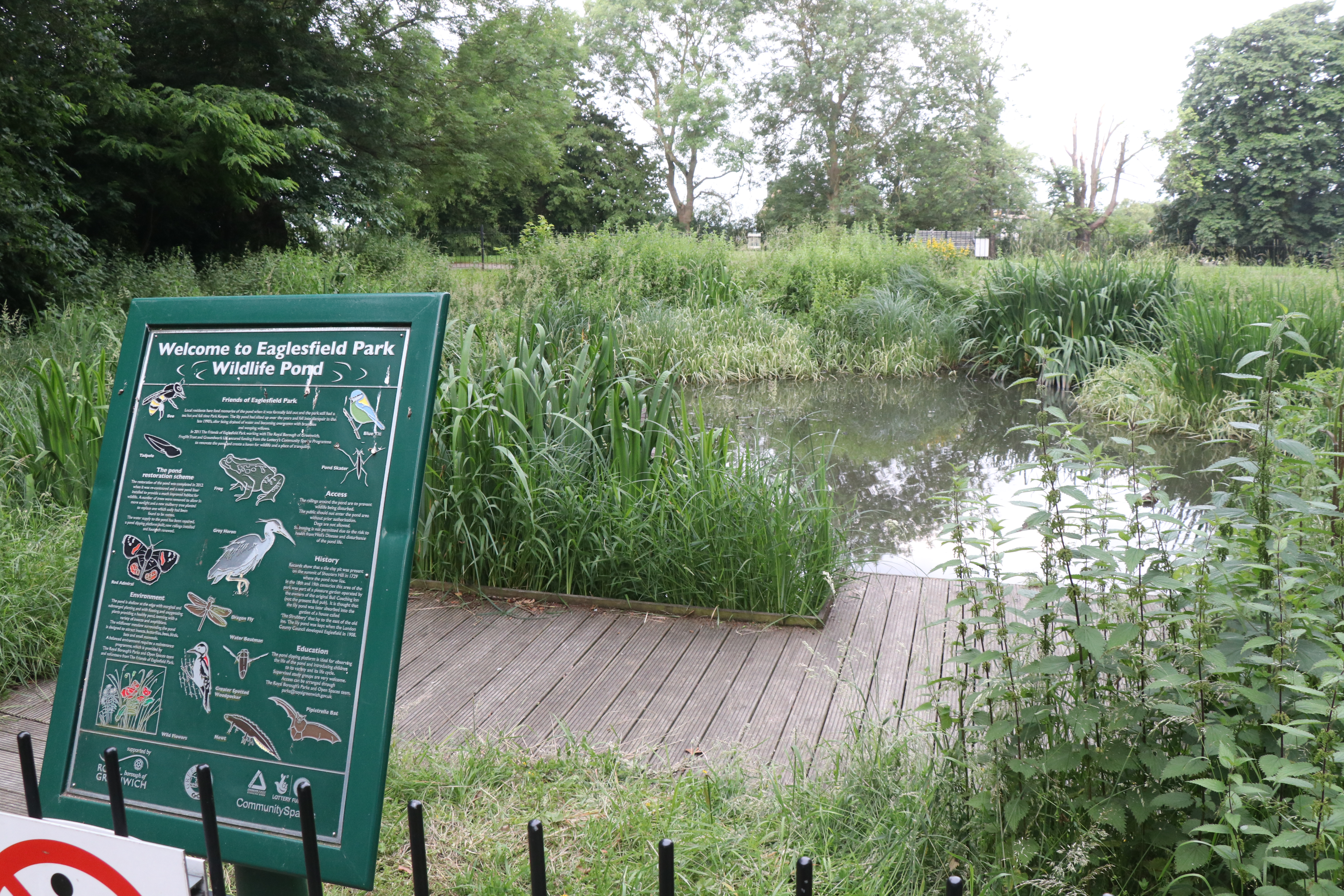
wildlife pond
