= Hanging Wood, London =

Coordinates: 51.489°N 0.043°E

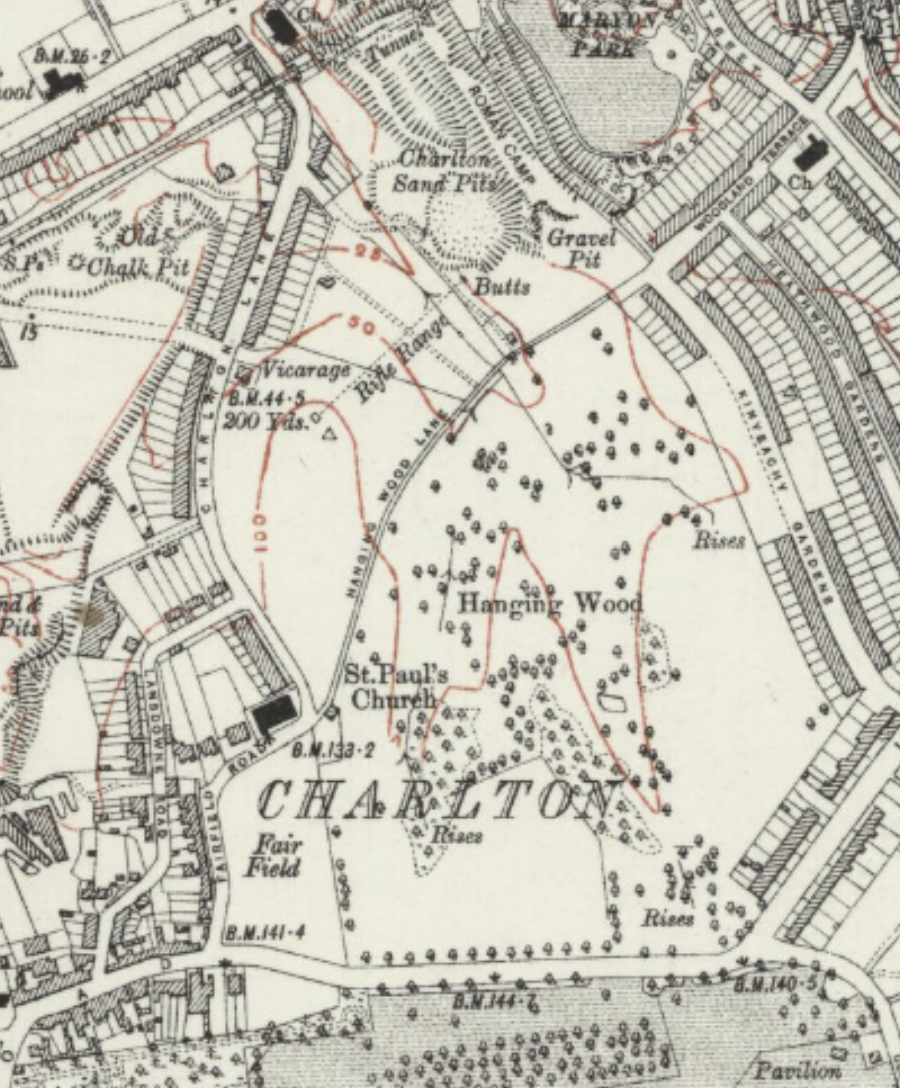
Hanging Wood (1920), today Maryon Wilson Park

Hanging Wood was a former woodland area located in what is now southeast London, which covered a geographical area between Woolwich Common and Charlton. Hanging Wood was a hideout for highwaymen who operated on Shooter's Hill and Blackheath. Parts of the Hanging Wood are preserved as Maryon Park, Maryon Wilson Park and Gilbert's Pit in the Royal Borough of Greenwich.

Though it is popularly supposed that the wood was used for hanging those highwaymen who were caught, a more likely explanation for the name is the wood's location on steep slopes so that the trees appear to hang from the slope. Such woods are often referred to as 'hanging woods' (the word 'hang' comes from the Old English 'hangra', a wooded slope).
