= Oxleas Wood =

Forest in London, England

Coordinates: 51.467°N 0.066°E

Oxleas Woodlands
- Site of Special Scientific Interest
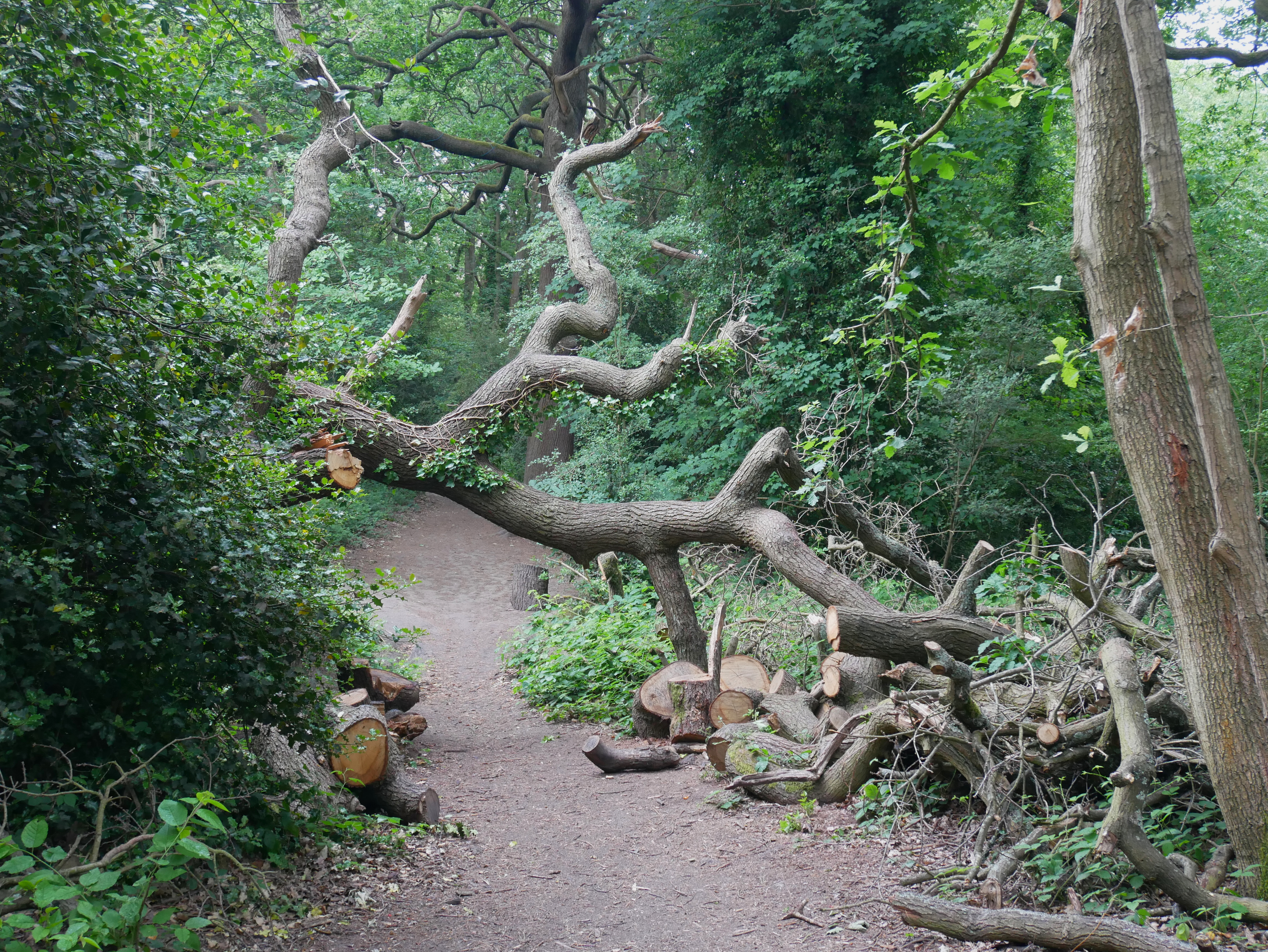
- Location of Oxleas Woodlands.
- Area of search: Greater London
- Grid reference: TQ442760
- Interest: Biological
- Area: 72.7 ha (180 acres)
- Notification date: 1984
- Location map: Magic Map

Oxleas Wood is one of the few remaining areas of ancient deciduous forest in Eltham in the Royal Borough of Greenwich (with a small amount passing over the boundary into the London Borough of Bexley), in southeast London. Some parts date back over 8,000 years to the end of the last ice age, the Younger Dryas. It is part of a larger continuous area of woodland and parkland on the south side of Shooter's Hill: other parts are Jack Wood, Castle Wood (home to Severndroog Castle), Oxleas Meadows, Falconwood Field, Eltham Common and Eltham Park North (the latter being divided by the A2 main road from its southern section). Eltham Park North includes the ancient Shepherdleas Wood.

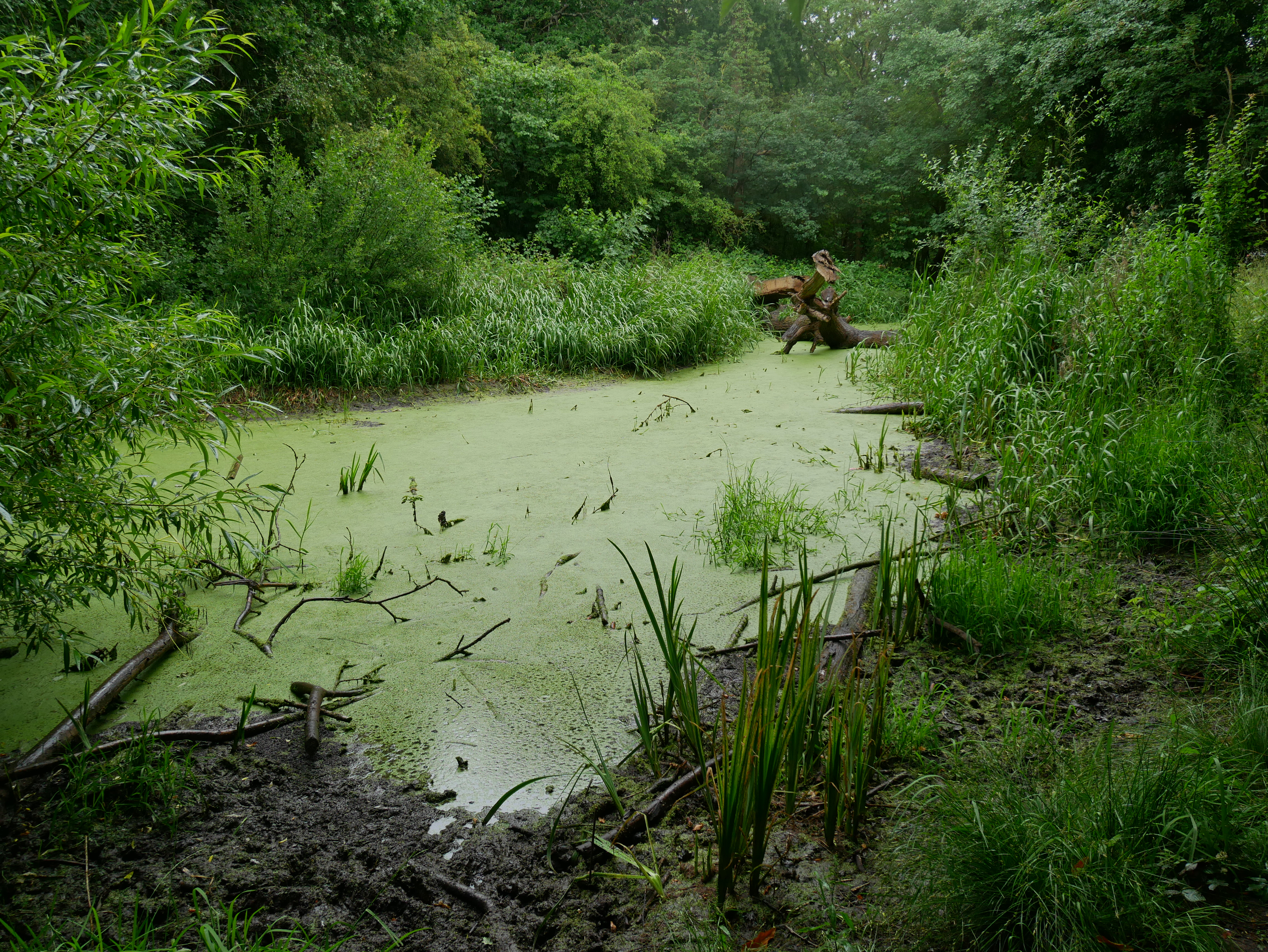
Pond on the south side of Oxleas Wood

== History ==
In 1311, the Royal manor of Eltham was established and this included the woods. The woods were leased to Sir John Shaw, 2nd Baronet, from crown occupation in 1679. His family managed them until 1811, when they were taken over by the War Department. The woods were then acquired by the London County Council for the use of public recreation in 1930, and then opened to the public in 1934. Ownership then passed from the Greater London Council to the Borough of Greenwich on abolition of the GLC in 1986.

In 1993 plans for an East London River Crossing that would have cut through Oxleas Wood were withdrawn following opposition from local residents. People Against the River Crossing (PARC), the road protest group formed to oppose the crossing, comprised local residents, with support from established environmental organisations, radical environmentalists and pagans. The campaign's objective was to halt the road scheme, by using all possible means within the established institutional framework. This involved 2 public inquiries and PARC's complaint to the European Commission, reinforced by legal action in conjunction with Greenwich Council, which led to the abandonment of the road project. Over 3,000 people and organisations signed a pledge in which they promised to engage in civil disobedience to defend the woodland.

== Description ==
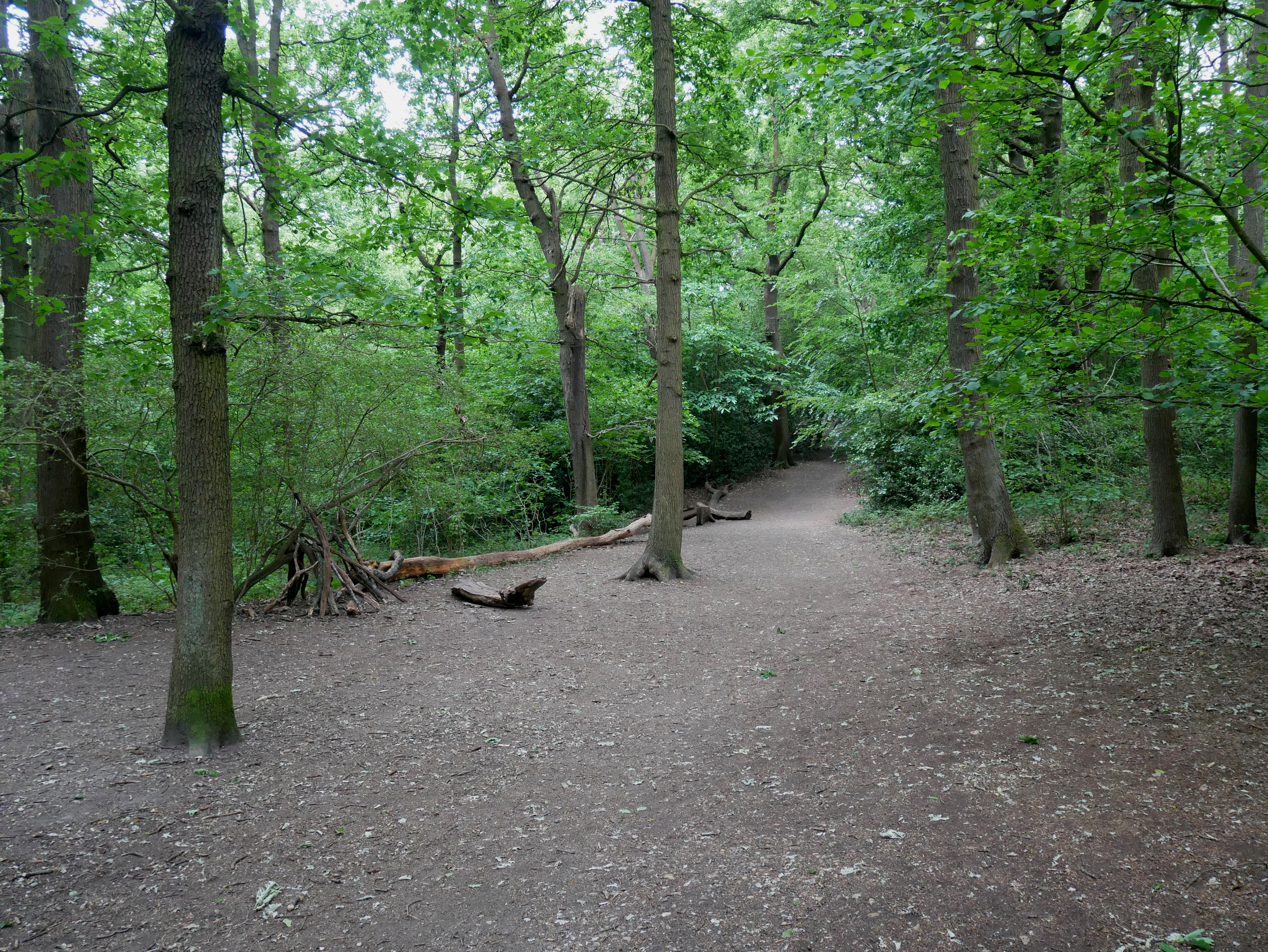
Trees in the Jack Wood area of Oxleas

Oxleas Wood, Jack Wood and Shepherdleas Wood are a Site of Special Scientific Interest called Oxleas Woodlands, covering 72 hectares with oak, silver birch, hornbeam, coppice hazel, and a great number of fine samples of the Wild Service Tree. A larger area including Eltham Common is designated a Local Nature Reserve called Oxleas/Shooters Hill Woodlands.

The site covers most of the top of Shooters Hill (in the Royal Borough of Greenwich).

There is an underground water reservoir in the grassed area called Oxleas Meadow. This serves the local area with water. This is associated with 'the hut' which is a building containing the equipment that Thames Water uses to control the reservoir. Several streams begin within Oxleas Wood, the longest being the Wogebourne which eventually joins the River Thames after flowing 8 km (5.0 mi).

Within Oxleas Meadow is a cafe. The café building is of brick construction and is owned by the Borough of Greenwich. Public male and female toilets are also located in this building and are available for use during the café opening hours. The café part of the building is leased to the café operator.

Within the woods there is a thriving honeybee apiary, the Oxleas Wood Apiary which was managed by the late apiarist John Large obit.

== See also ==
- List of Sites of Special Scientific Interest in London
- Greenwich parks and open spaces
