= Maryon Wilson Park =

Park in Greenwich, London, England

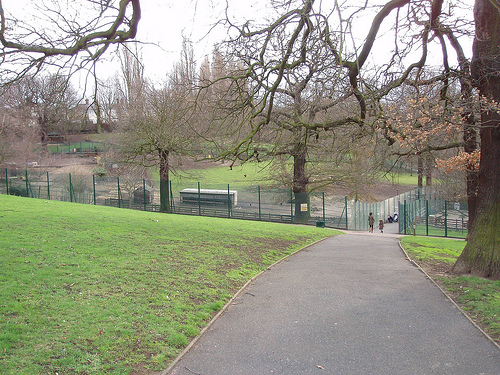
- Maryon Wilson Park, London
- Interactive map of Maryon Wilson Park
- Type: • Public park • Urban park
- Location: Charlton, Greenwich, London, England, United Kingdom
- Coordinates: 51.4847°N 0.0431°E
- Operator: Greenwich London Borough Council
- Status: Open year round
- Website: "Maryon Wilson Park" (descriptive page on Maryon Wilson Park on the Greenwich London Borough Council's official website)

Maryon Wilson Park is a public park in Charlton, in the Royal Borough of Greenwich in south east London. It is bounded on its northwest side by Thorntree Road; its southern-most, and highest, point is a gateway on to Charlton Park Road.

Together with Maryon Park and Gilbert's Pit (which both sit to the north of Maryon Wilson Park), it is a Local Nature Reserve, and, along with nearby Charlton Park, forms part of the South East London Green Chain.

== History ==
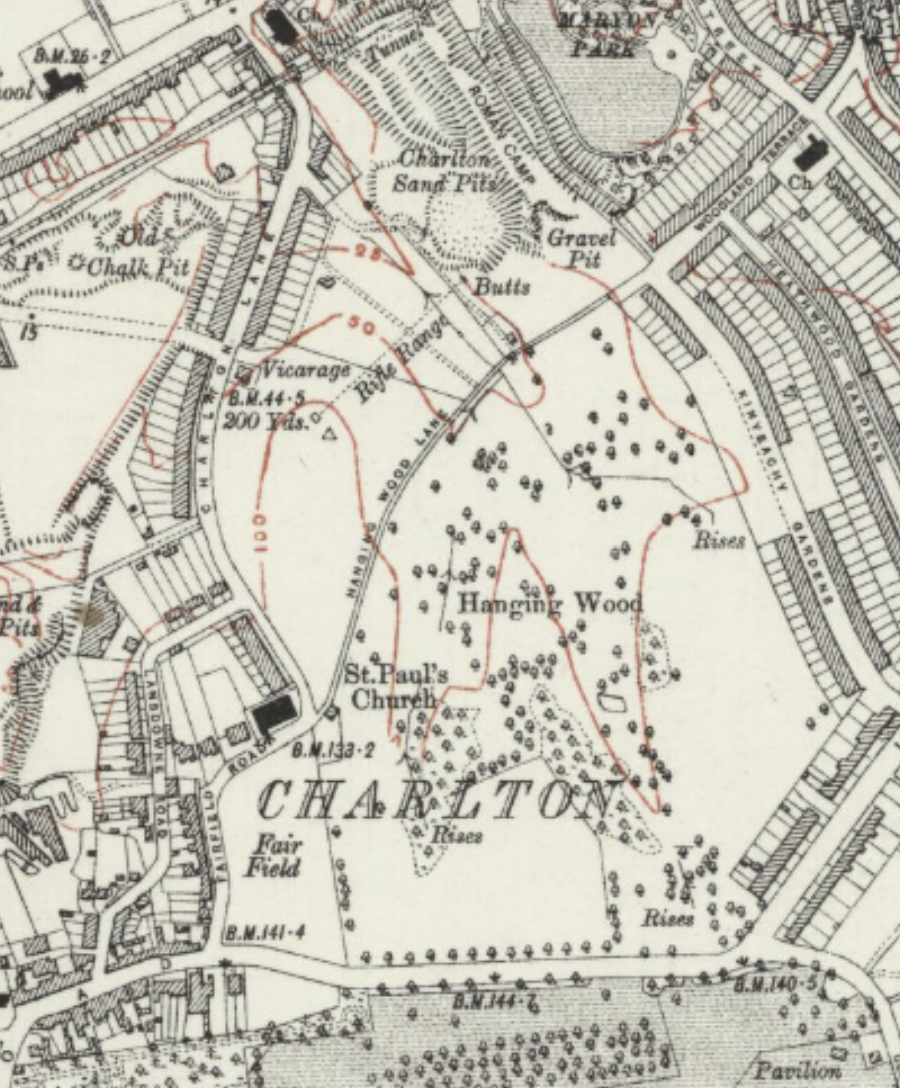
Hanging Wood, location of Maryon Wilson Park (1920)

The park is a remnant of ancient forest once known as Hanging Wood (the word 'hang' comes from the Old English 'hangra', a wooded slope), reputedly a haunt of highwaymen. A road, Hanging Wood Lane (today Thorntree Road) ran across the north side of the area that later formed the park.

Daniel Lysons in his 1796 Environs of London described the woodland: "There are in character about ninety acres of woodland called Hanging Wood, belonging to the Lord of the Manor, through which there is a very pleasant walk to Woolwich. The wood, the variety of uneven ground, and the occasional view of the river, contribute to make the neighbourhood remarkably picturesque."

The wood was formerly part of the estate of Charlton Manor, owned by the Maryon Wilson family from 1767 until 1925. In 1855, Sir Thomas Maryon Wilson had provided eight acres of land for Charlton Cemetery, southeast of the wood. In 1890, Sir Spencer Maryon Wilson provided land for the creation of Maryon Park to the north, and, facing heavy tax demands in 1912, he offered the woods to London County Council to purchase. LCC did not take up this option, but by way of an indenture on 5 February 1924 Sir Spencer donated 32 acres of Hanging Wood to the LCC for the use and enjoyment of the public. Maryon Wilson Park was officially opened by LCC leader Sir George Hume in July 1926.

== Animal park ==
The park is known for its animal park where tours are conducted (although not required); tours typically take two hours and give children the opportunity to feed, pet and interact with the animals. Free public tours are led by the Park Ranger Service every Wednesday starting at 1.30 pm. The tours are strictly limited to the first 50 people on the day. Tours begin at the deer pen.

In 2011, the animal park was threatened with closure after Greenwich council withdrew its funding.
