= Gilbert's Pit =

Nature reserve in Charlton, London, England

Coordinates: 51.4888°N 0.0418°E

Gilbert's Pit (Charlton)
- Site of Special Scientific Interest
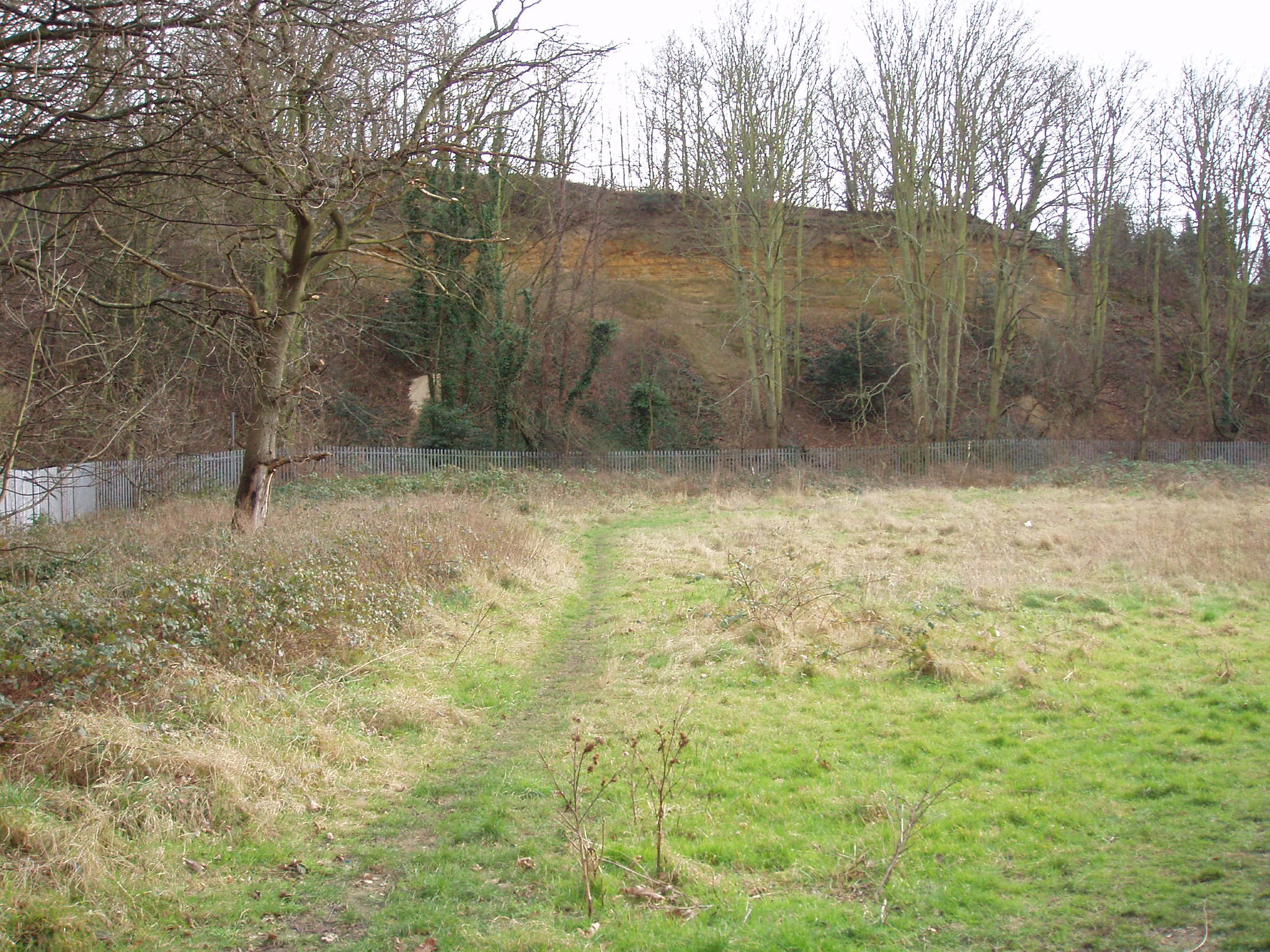
- Location of Gilbert's Pit (Charlton).
- Area of search: Greater London
- Grid reference: TQ418786
- Interest: Geological
- Area: 5.2 ha (13 acres)
- Notification date: 1985
- Location map: Magic Map

Gilbert's Pit is a 5.2-hectare (13-acre) geological Site of Special Scientific Interest in Charlton in the Royal Borough of Greenwich. It was notified in 1985 and was formerly known as Charlton Sand Pit. It is a Geological Conservation Review site. It is also part of the Maryon Wilson Park and Gilbert's Pit Local Nature Reserve. It adjoins Maryon Park and is close to Maryon Wilson Park.

== History ==
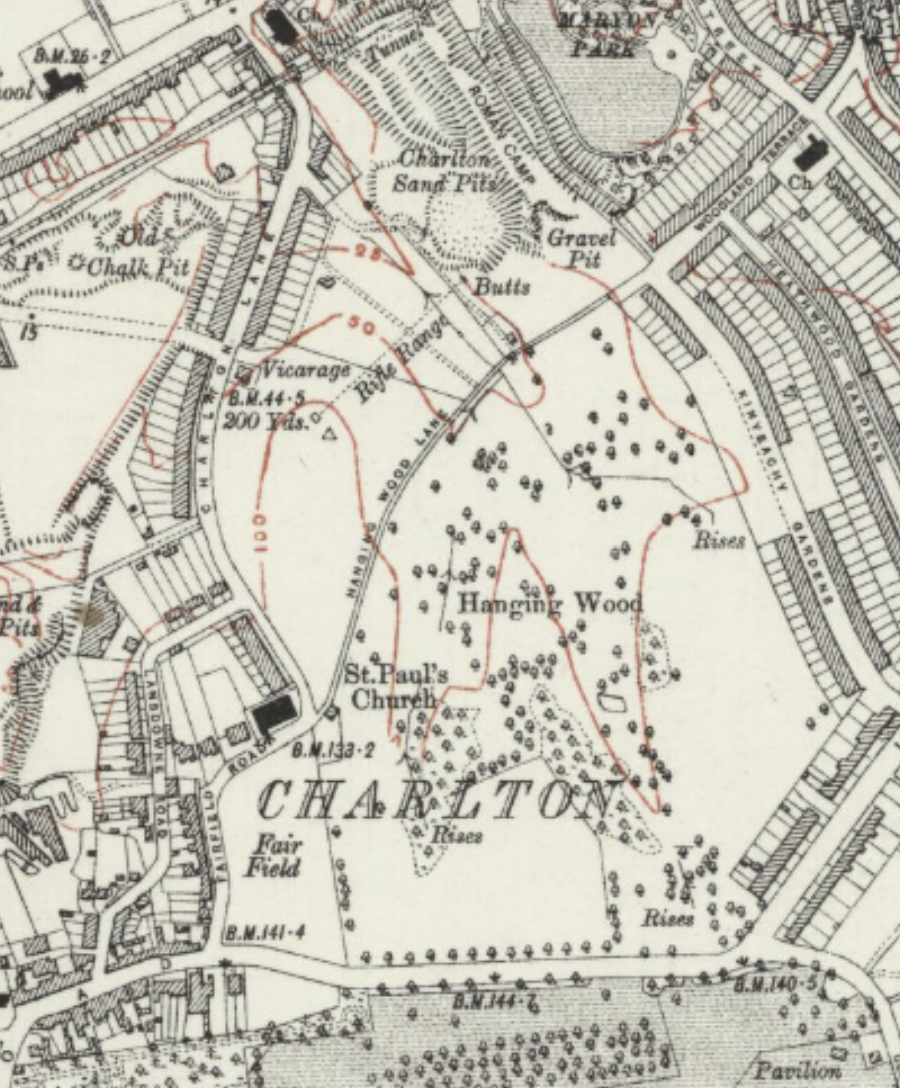
Hanging Wood, with the Pit to the north (1920)

There was a Romano-British settlement on Cox's Mount, the summit of Gilbert's Pit, between the first and fifth centuries. The area was part of the ancient Hanging Wood. The Pit was part of the estate of the Maryon-Wilson family. From the late eighteenth century to 1889 it was worked for sand, and it was named after one of the managers, Mr E. Gilbert. It was purchased by the London County Council in 1930.

== Geology ==
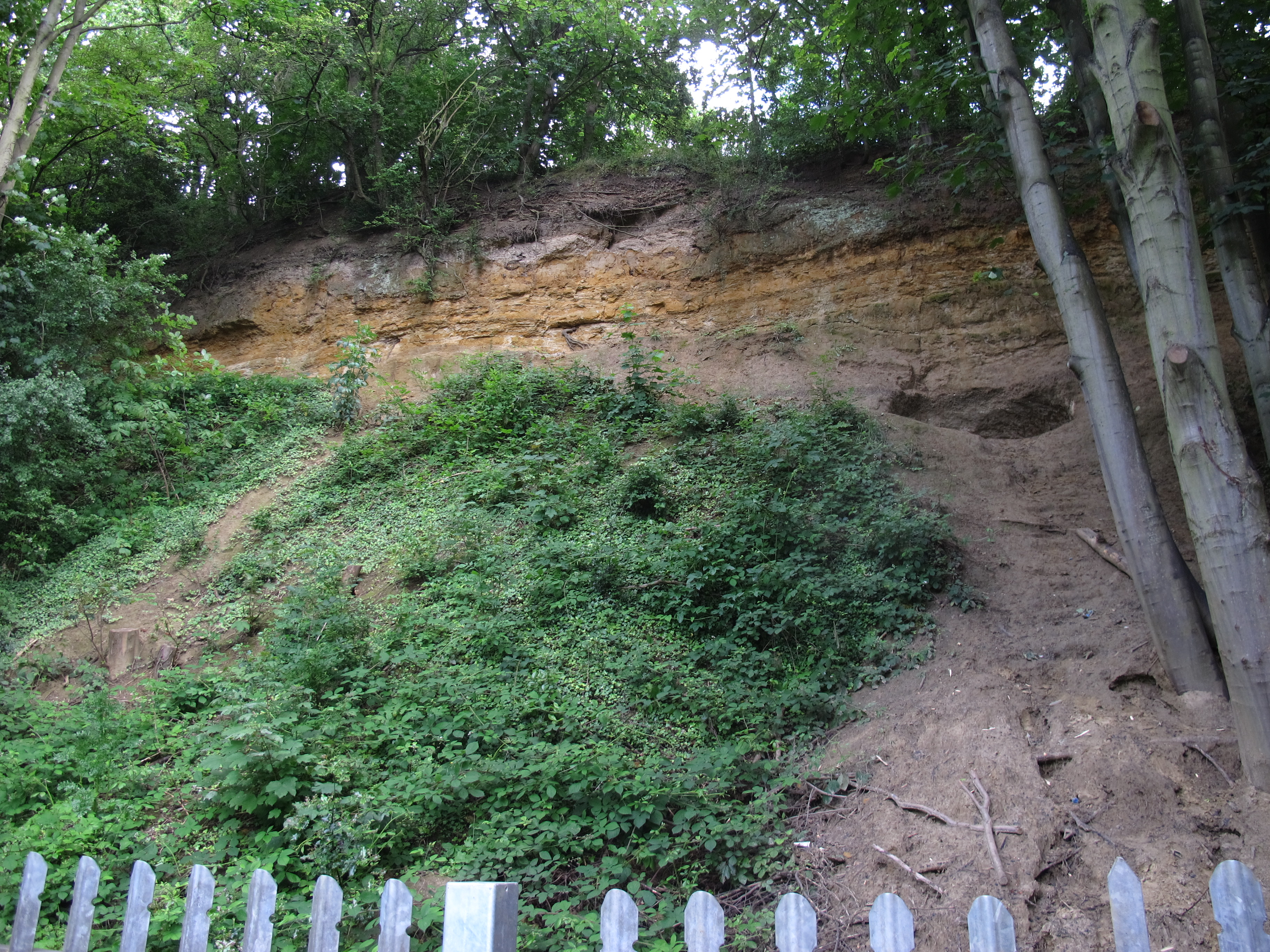
Paleogene succession exposed in the old quarry face. The grey sand making up the lower two-thirds of the face is the Thanet Formation, This is overlain by the yellow-brown weathering sands of the Upnor Formation (the lower part of the Lambeth Group). The overlying Woolwich Formation consists of the distinctive light grey shell bed, followed by dark grey clays. The top of the slope has the distinctive black flint pebbles of the Harwich Formation (better known locally as the Blackheath Beds)

Gilbert's Pit is an important Paleogene site, displaying one of the most complete sequences of sediments in Greater London. The Paleocene Thanet and Woolwich Formations date to around 55 million years ago. Some of the beds yield many fossils of plants, sponges, molluscs, fish and reptiles. The site has been studied for over 120 years and is the subject of a substantial literature.

== Ecology ==
The site is steeply sided. The main trees are birch and oak, and there is yellow gorse and broom on the upper slopes. On the lower slopes hawthorn provides nesting sites for birds.

== Access ==
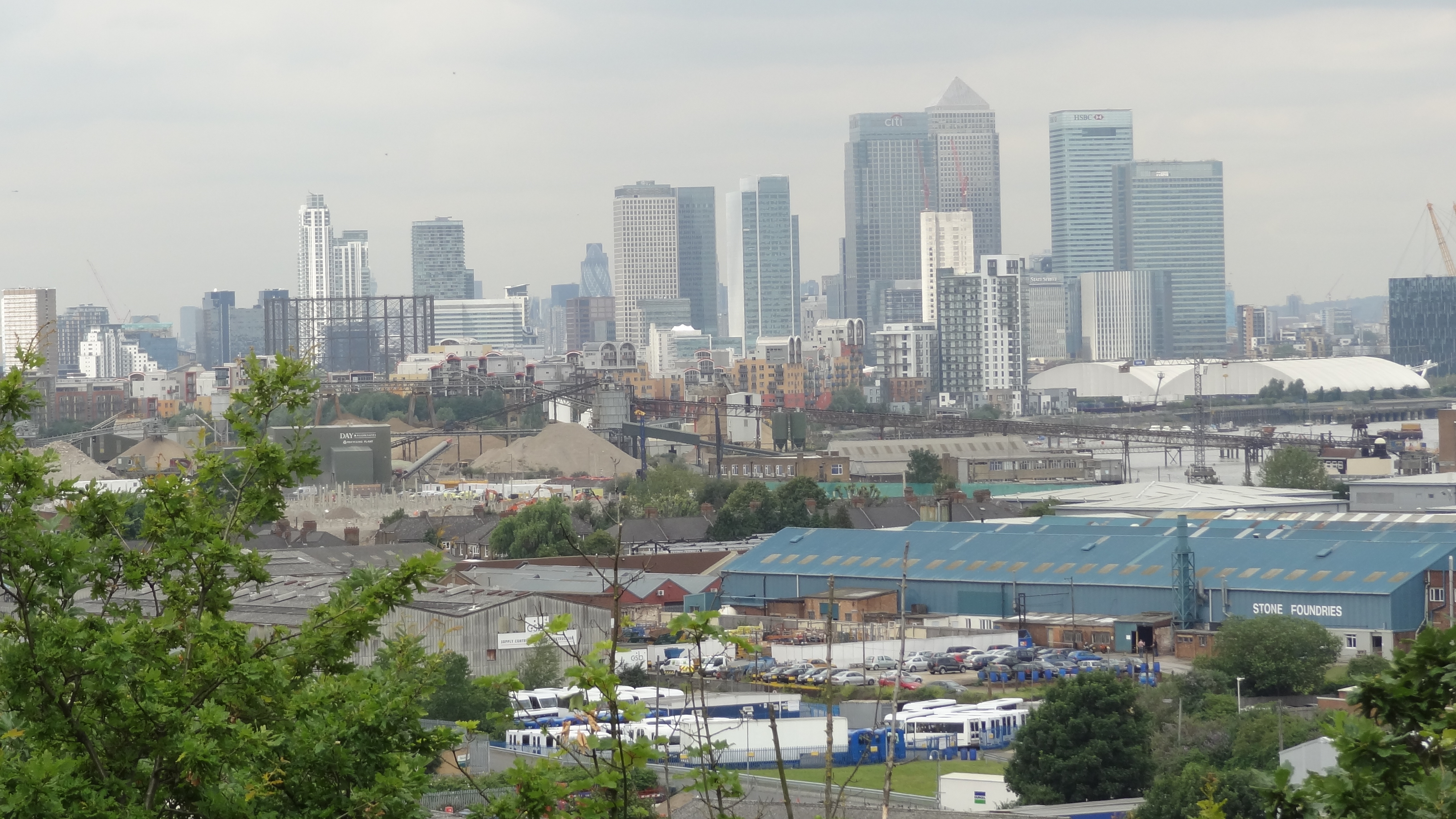
View north west from Cox's Mount at the top of Gilbert's Pit

Much of the site is fenced off. There is access to the part which is open from Charlton Lane and a path from the Gilbert's Pit information board in Maryon Park leads up to Cox's Mount, which has fine views over London.

== Land ownership ==
All land within Gilbert's Pit SSSI is owned by the local authority.

== See also ==
- List of Sites of Special Scientific Interest in Greater London
