= Maryon Park =

Park in Charlton, London, England

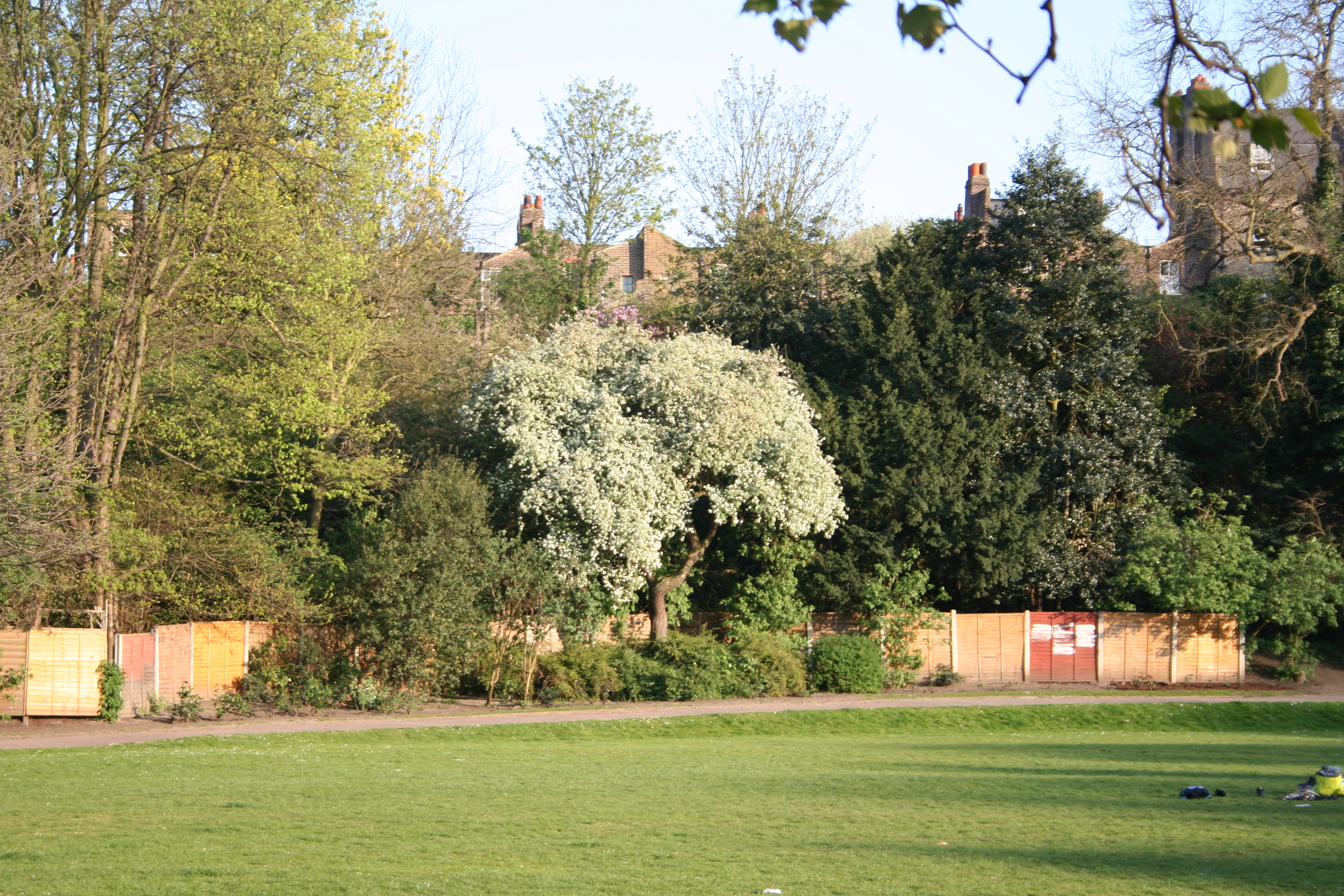
- Maryon Park, London
- Interactive map of Maryon Park
- Type: • Public park • Urban park
- Location: Charlton, Greenwich, London, England, United Kingdom
- Coordinates: 51.489°N 0.043°E
- Operator: Greenwich London Borough Council
- Status: Open year round
- Website: "Marion Park" (descriptive page on Maryon Park at greenwich.gov.uk, the Greenwich London Borough Council's official website)

Maryon Park is an urban public park located in Charlton in the Royal Borough of Greenwich, London, United Kingdom. It is situated on the A206 road south of the Thames Barrier, and is accessible from Woolwich Road, Charlton Lane and Thorntree Road. It is part of the Maryon Wilson Park and Gilbert's Pit Local Nature Reserve.

== History ==
Charlton sandpits, which were originally part of an area known as Hanging Wood, were presented to the London County Council in 1891 by the Maryon-Wilson family, and one of the pits became Maryon Park. Another pit became Charlton Athletic's football stadium, The Valley.

The park was originally wooded and, together with what is now Maryon Wilson Park, was known as Hanging Woods. This was a wild wooded area and formed an ideal retreat for highwaymen who robbed travellers on Shooters Hill and Blackheath. Though it is popularly supposed that the wood was used for hanging those who were caught, a more likely explanation for the name is the wood's location on steep slopes so that the trees appear to hang from the slope. Such woods are often referred to as 'hanging woods' (the word 'hang' comes from the Old English 'hangra', a wooded slope).

The park was opened in 1891, with J. J. Sexby, then chief surveyor to LCC's parks department, designing serpentine paths around the slopes of the hill.

== Flora ==
The park contains grassland, with hawkweed, gorse and broom.

== Attractions and facilities ==
The park includes Cox's Mount, which was used by the Romans as a hill fort, which was discovered in 1915. In the 1850s, Cox's Mount was used to help ships on the River Thames adjust their compasses.

The park has hard tennis courts, a basketball court and a children's play area. The Capital Ring walk and Green Chain trails both pass through the park.

=== Nearby attractions ===
Adjacent to the park to the south is Gilbert's Pit, a Site of Special Scientific Interest. The similarly named Maryon Wilson Park is located south of Gilbert's Pit.

== In popular culture ==
Several scenes in Michelangelo Antonioni's 1966 film Blowup were shot in Maryon Park.
