= Charlton, London =

Area of southeast London, England

Coordinates: 51°29′10″N 0°01′59″E

Charlton
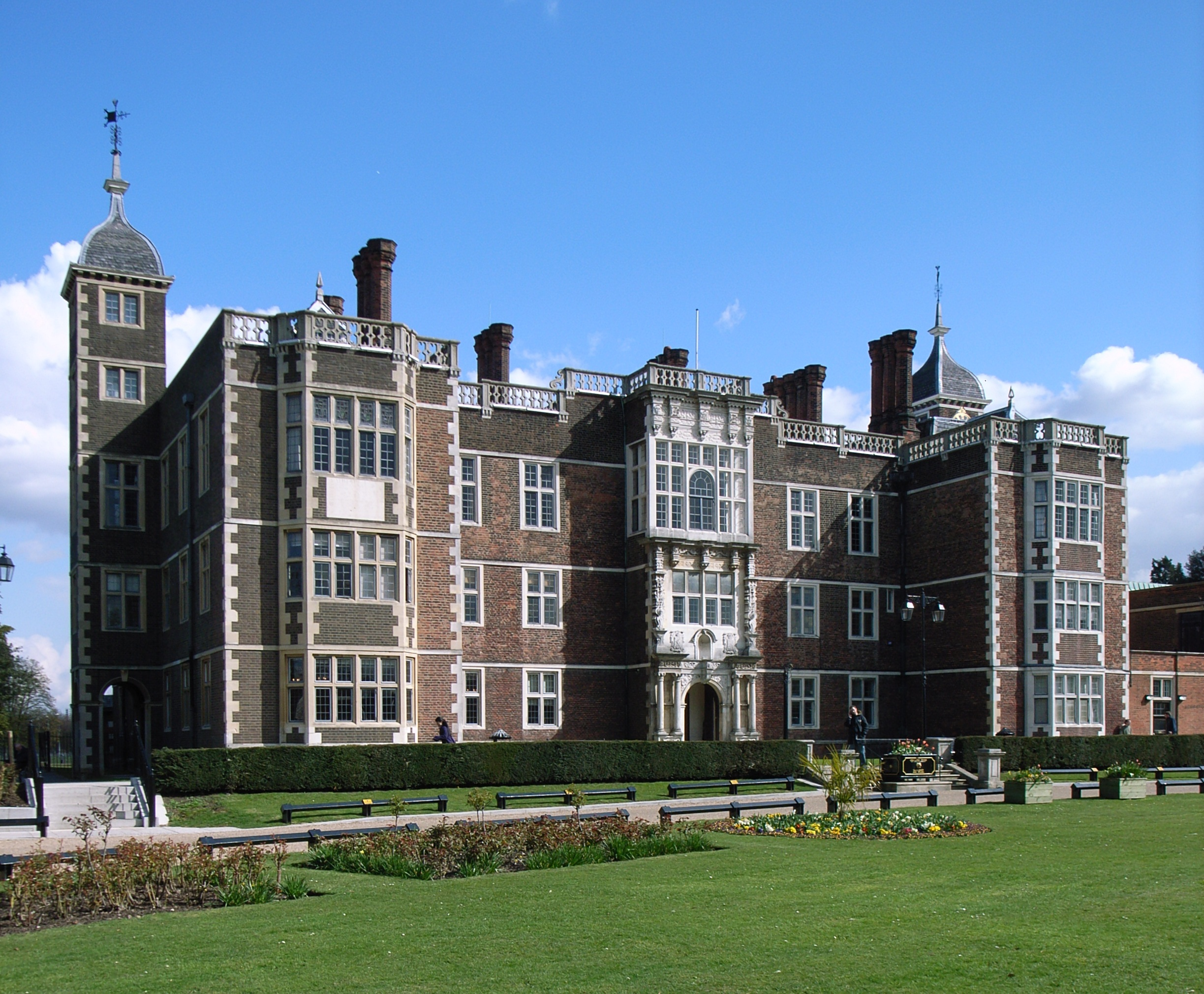
- Charlton House

- Location within Greater London
- Population: 14,385 (2011 census for Charlton ward)
- OS grid reference: TQ415785
  - Charing Cross: 7.2 mi (11.6 km) WNW
- London borough: Greenwich
- Ceremonial county: Greater London
- Region: London
- Country: England
- Sovereign state: United Kingdom
- Post town: LONDON
- Postcode district: SE7
- Dialling code: 020
- Police: Metropolitan
- Fire: London
- Ambulance: London
- UK Parliament: Greenwich and Woolwich
- London Assembly: Greenwich and Lewisham

Charlton is an area of southeast London, England, in the Royal Borough of Greenwich. It is east of Greenwich and west of Woolwich, on the south bank of the River Thames, 7.2 miles (11.6 km) southeast of Charing Cross. An ancient parish in the county of Kent, it became part of the metropolitan area of London in 1855 and is home to Charlton Athletic and Charlton House.

== History ==
=== Toponymy ===
Charlton is recorded in the 1086 Domesday Book as Cerletone. It is formed from Old English 'ceorl' and 'tūn' and means 'farmstead of the freemen or peasants'. It is a common English placename and the parish was also known as Charlton next Woolwich to distinguish it from Charlton by Dover. During the 19th century the riverside portion of the area became known as New Charlton.

=== Middle Ages ===
Charlton is assessed in the Domesday Book of 1086 at one "sulung", which is commonly held to have been the equivalent of two hides. In 1086 it was in the fee of Gundulf, bishop of Rochester, but in 1066 it had been held from the king as two estates, by two brothers, named Godwine and Alweard. Though assessed at only one sulung, it had a slightly higher value than might be expected, at £7, both in 1066 and in 1086. A church dedicated to St Luke is recorded in the village as early as 1077, although no trace of the medieval building survives.

In 1093, the manor of Charlton was given to Bermondsey Abbey by Bishop Robert Bloet of Lincoln. In 1268, the Abbey was granted a Monday market at Charlton, as well as an annual fair of three days, centred on Trinity Sunday, the eighth Sunday after Easter.

=== Renaissance ===
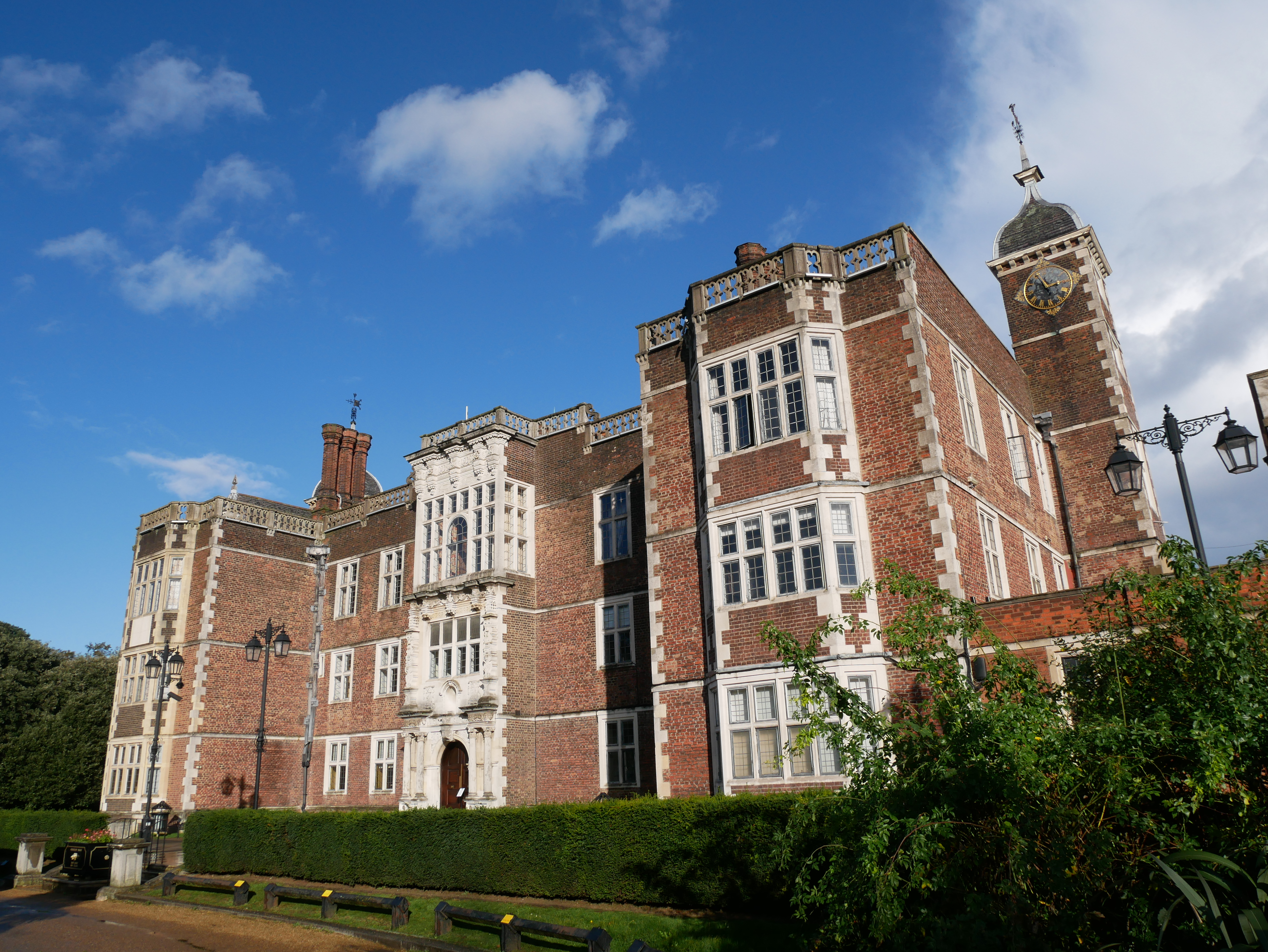
The west face of Charlton House

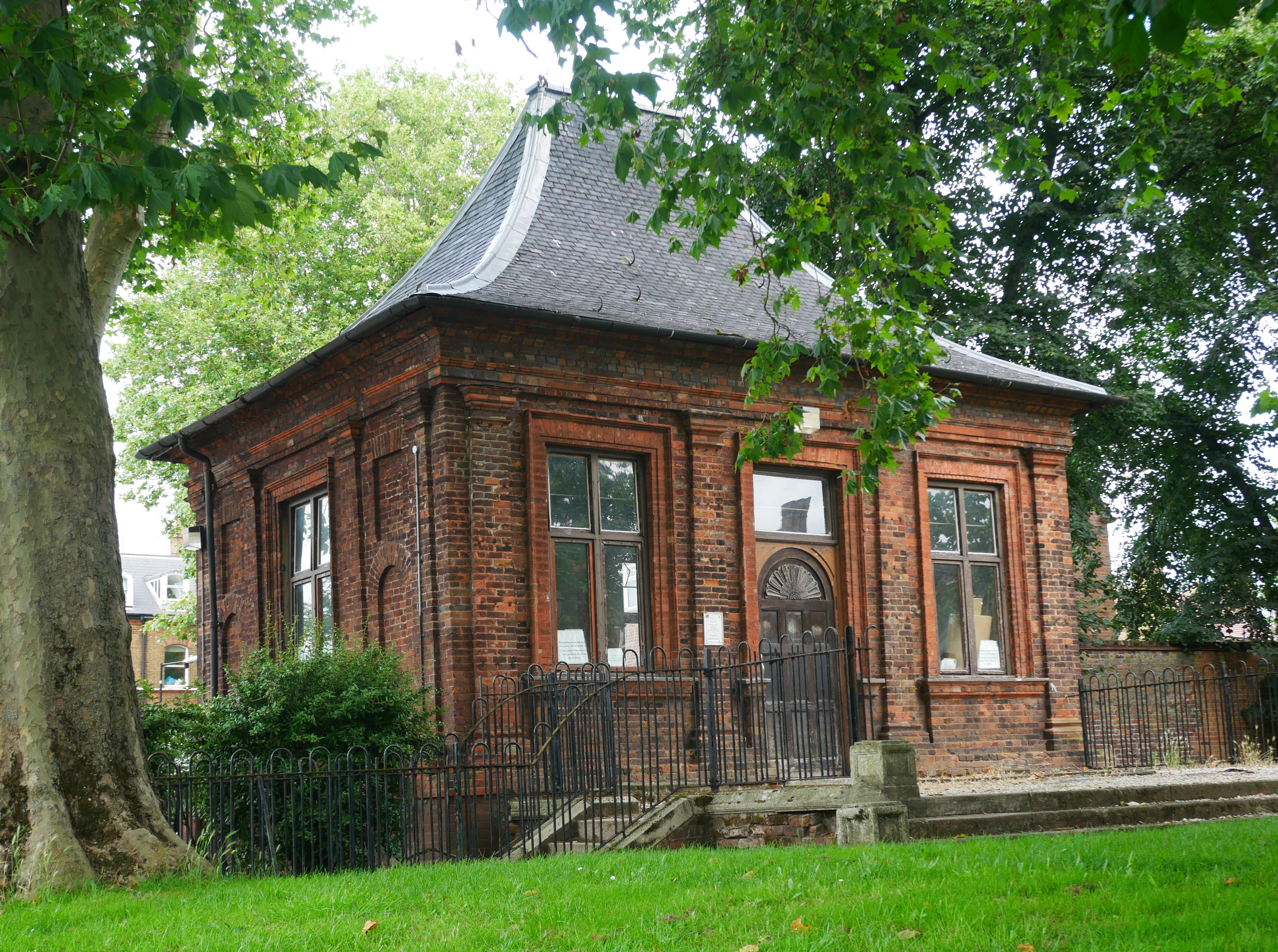
The 17th-century Garden House in Charlton House

Between 1607 and 1612, Sir Adam Newton, tutor to Prince Henry, eldest son of James I, had a new manor house, Charlton House, built in the village. The Jacobean mansion by architect John Thorpe was never used by the prince, who died in 1612. On the northern edge of the house's garden is a mulberry tree planted in 1608 by order of King James in an effort to cultivate silkworms. On the death of Sir Adam, his executors Peter Newton and David Cunningham of Auchenharvie were charged to rebuild St Luke's Church.

=== Early Modern ===
The manor was subsequently acquired by the colonial administrator Sir William Langhorne, 1st Baronet, who is buried in the parish church. Upon his death without issue in 1715, his possessions in Charlton and Hampstead passed to the Conyers baronets, and subsequently to the Maryon-Wilson baronets.

In the early 18th century, Charlton was described by Daniel Defoe as:

a village famous, or rather infamous for the yearly collected rabble of mad-people, at Horn-Fair; the rudeness of which I cannot but think, is such as ought to be suppressed, and indeed in a civiliz'd well govern'd nation, it may well be said to be unsufferable. The mob indeed at that time take all kinds of liberties, and the women are especially impudent for that day; as if it was a day that justify'd the giving themselves a loose to all manner of indecency and immodesty, without any reproach, or without suffering the censure which such behaviour would deserve at another time. (from A Tour through Great Britain)

The Horn Fair (or Charlton Fair) was held regularly on 18 October each year, and retained its reputation for lawlessness; in 1833, for example, police arrested a swindler who had cheated several artillerymen. In 1857, following the abolition of nearby Greenwich Fair, Charlton Fair was described in the Morning Chronicle as "more like a carnival of the very worst and most vulgar class than any fair in the country." The Horn Fair was abolished, along with the livestock fairs of nearby Blackheath, by order of Henry Austin Bruce, the reforming Home Secretary, in 1872.

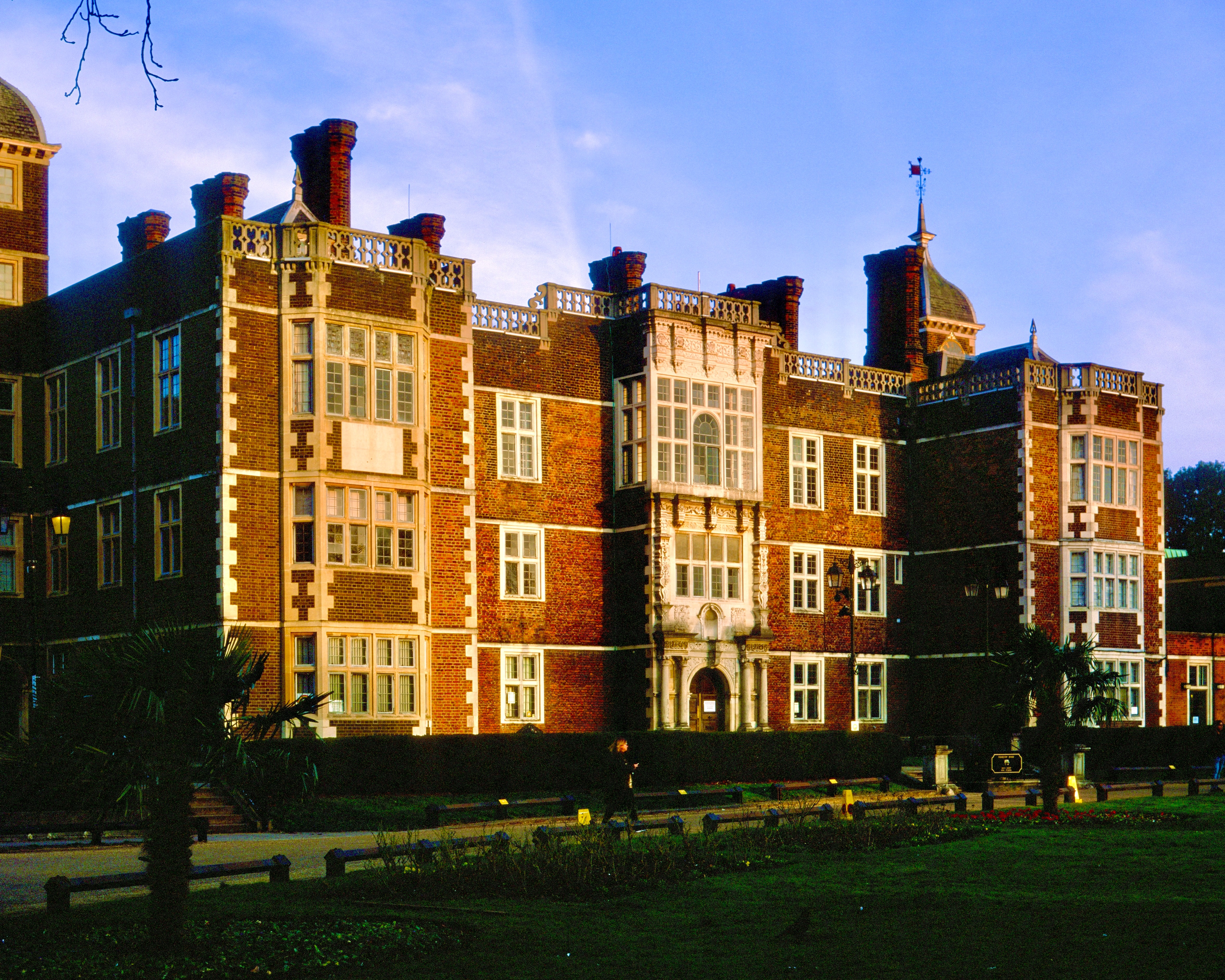
Another view of the west face of Charlton House in the evening.

In the early nineteenth century, Spencer Perceval, the only British Prime Minister to be assassinated, was buried at St Luke's church; Perceval's wife having been a member of the Maryon-Wilson family. In 1843, Charlton was the site of the death and burial of murdered civil servant Edward Drummond, whose assassination led to the establishment of the M'Naghten Rules for legal insanity.

=== Industrialisation ===
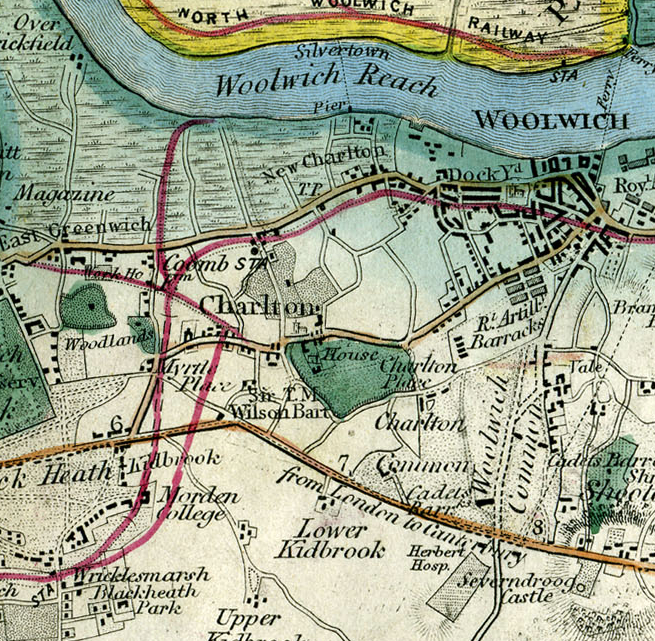
Charlton Village in James Wyld's map of 1872

The flat land adjoining the Thames at Charlton Riverside has been a significant industrial area since Victorian times. The establishment of heavy industry centred on Charlton Pier, and led to a number of serious fires in the area in the mid 19th century. A notable establishment was the Siemens Brothers Telegraph Works (although largely in the parish of Woolwich) opened in 1863, which manufactured two new transatlantic cables in the 1880s, and contributed to PLUTO in World War 2. It was in this industrialised area that Charlton Athletic F.C. was established in 1905, before moving a short distance to The Valley in 1919.

=== 20th century ===
From 1903 to 1913, the Italian writer Italo Svevo lived in a house on Charlton Church Lane which now bears a blue plaque in his honour. He had arrived there in his capacity as a director in a Trieste firm selling high-quality underwater paint for ships, on whose behalf he established a factory in Charlton's Anchor and Hope Lane, fulfilling a big contract with the British Royal Navy.

The non-ferrous foundry of J. Stone & Co moved to Charlton from Deptford in 1917, and produced 22,000 propellers for the Royal Navy during World War II (its products being fitted to battleships, aircraft carriers, cruisers and numerous smaller vessels), plus propellers and water-tight doors for RMS Queen Mary, RMS Queen Elizabeth and Royal Yacht Britannia. In 1963 Stone's marine propeller business merged with Manganese Bronze (also originally founded in Deptford, in 1882, before relocating to Millwall and then Birkenhead in 1941) and manufacture moved to Birkenhead. Stone Foundries still operates at Charlton, in a plant established in 1939 to produce aluminium and magnesium light alloy castings mainly for the aircraft industry, and production of nails and rivets continues at nearby Stone Fasteners.

The estates surrounding Charlton House were gradually broken up, and once the Maryon-Wilson family died out in 1925, the surviving open spaces were converted into public parks, two of which bear the family name. The house itself became the property of the local authority (currently the Royal Borough of Greenwich) and is used as a library and community centre. Maryon Park was used as the filming location for the pivotal murder scene in Michelangelo Antonioni's film Blow-Up (1966).

== Local government ==
A map showing the Charlton ward of Greenwich Metropolitan Borough as it appeared in 1916.

Charlton has formed part of the London Borough of Greenwich (now the Royal Borough of Greenwich) since its formation in 1965. Prior to that it was the easternmost part of the Metropolitan Borough of Greenwich, which succeeded the Lee, formerly Plumstead, District in 1900. Before the passage of the Metropolis Management Act 1855, Charlton was a civil parish in its own right. On 1 April 1901 the civil parish was abolished to form Charlton and Kidbrooke. At the 1891 census (one of the last before the abolition of the parish), Charlton next Woolwich had a population of 11,742.

Within the borough, Charlton is mainly covered by the Charlton Village and Riverside ward. Charlton's riverside areas were previously part of the Woolwich Riverside ward, which also included Woolwich Dockyard and Woolwich Arsenal. Charlton has only elected Labour councillors since 1971, while Woolwich Riverside had been Labour-controlled since its creation in 2002.

In the Westminster parliament, Charlton is covered by the Greenwich and Woolwich constituency, which has been represented by Matthew Pennycook since 2015. In the London Assembly, Charlton falls within the Greenwich and Lewisham constituency, which has been represented by Labour's Len Duvall since its creation in 2000.

== Geography ==
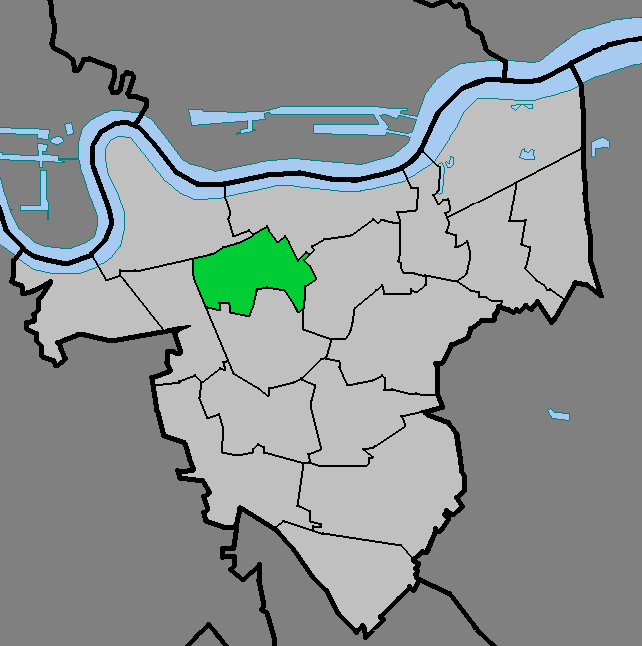
The ward of Charlton (green) within Royal Borough of Greenwich (light grey)

The centre of Charlton, known as Charlton Village, lies on the edge of high ground about 7 miles east-south-east of central London, on the B210. West of the village the main road is called Charlton Road, and to the east, Charlton Park Road; the road itself is called 'The Village' in the village centre. A preserved model K2 red telephone box stands on Charlton Road. A minor road called Charlton Church Lane leads north down the hill from St Luke's Church to the station and the A206. Beyond the railway line lies the more heavily industrial riverside area referred to as New Charlton or Charlton Riverside.

Charlton is also home to several parks of varying features, namely Maryon Park, Maryon Wilson Park, Hornfair Park, named in reference to the old Horn Fair, and Charlton Park, which is largely made up of sports pitches or playing fields. Adjoining Maryon Park is the Gilbert's Pit Site of Special Scientific Interest, which was formerly a major site of sand extraction. Most of the parks lie in the area once covered by Hanging Wood.

The architecture of Charlton is diverse, offering an insight into how different parts of the area were built up, as it evolved from a Thames-side village into the London suburb that it is today. Charlton gave its name to Charlton House, and has links with the classic architect Inigo Jones, a street being named after him. Other streets in Charlton named after prominent figures or places include Montcalm, Henry, Prince of Wales, Canberra, and Kashmir. There are four main pubs within the vicinity of Charlton Village, including The Bugle Horn, a late 17th-century coaching inn. A major landmark on the north side of the village is The Valley stadium, home to Charlton Athletic F.C. since 1919.

New Charlton is the site of the southern end of the Thames Barrier, including the Barrier's main operational area and visitor centre. In 2013, a university technical college named Royal Greenwich UTC opened its campus nearby, under the auspices of the University of Greenwich. It is now a free school called Royal Greenwich Trust School.

The nearest areas are Blackheath, Eltham, Greenwich, Kidbrooke, Maze Hill, North Greenwich, Plumstead, Welling, Westcombe Park and Woolwich.

== Demography ==
According to the 2011 UK census, the population of the Charlton ward was 14,385. 52.4% of the population was White and British background; the next largest ethnic groups were Black African (10.6%) and White (Other) (9.3%). The population included people of every British and Irish national identity except Cornish. 81.8% of residents spoke English as a first language; of the remainder, the greatest proportion spoke Nepalese. 47.2% of the population were Christians and 29.1% had no religion; 8.4% stated no religion, and the next largest religious group was Muslims with 6.8% of the population.

Of 5,739 households in the ward, 1,796 (31.3%) contained no adults in employment. Out of an active workforce of 6,698 people, 11.8% worked in wholesale, retail or auto repair; 11.4% in education, and 11.4% in health and social care. 22.8% of those employed worked in professional occupations 42.95 of people in the ward were aged 20–44.

== Economy ==
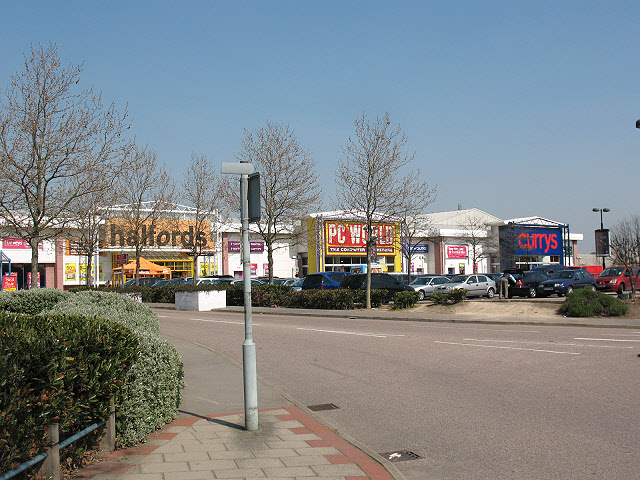
Stone Lake Retail Park

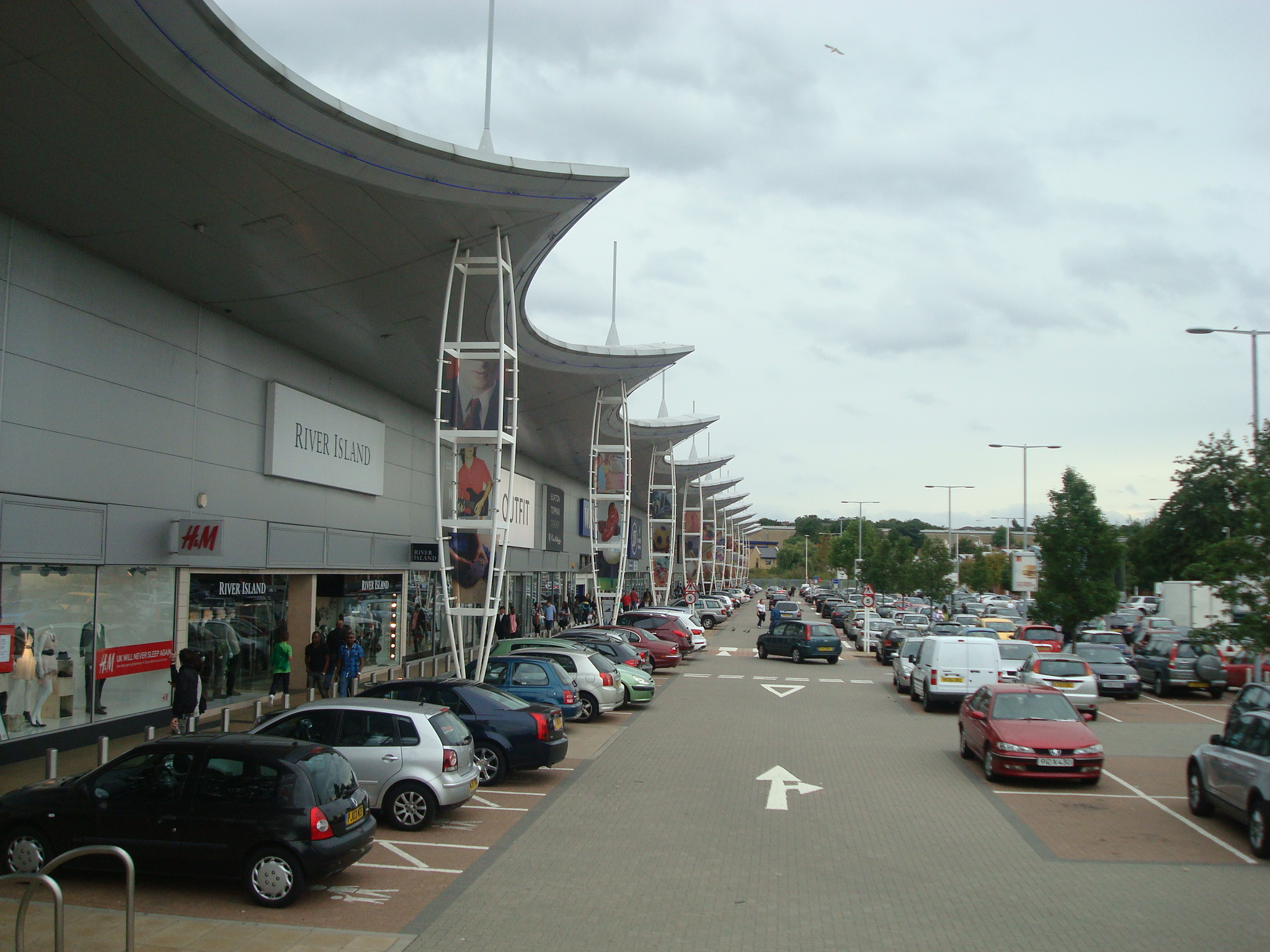
Greenwich Shopping Park

Charlton Village retains a number of traditional businesses including an ironmonger. However, a much larger shopping area is located in New Charlton, to the north, including the Greenwich Shopping Park, the Peninsula Retail Park and Stone Lake Retail Park. A new Sainsbury's superstore opened in 2015 between Woolwich Road and Bugsby's Way. This new store replaced the Greenwich Peninsula branch, itself less than 15 years old and hailed at the time of its opening as a 'supermarket of the future'. Sainsbury's also has a large distribution centre in New Charlton; it was rebuilt and expanded in 2012 and re-opened by deputy prime minister Nick Clegg in 2013.

New Charlton is also home to the area's surviving heavy industry. In the 19th century the area was dominated by a large ropewalk and other maritime businesses. In recent years marine aggregates have predominated, including the major facility at Angerstein Wharf which incorporates the former Christie's Wharf site.

Until the 19th century, mineral extraction was a major local industry. The Valley stadium stands on the site of a large chalk pit, while Gilbert's Pit once supplied central London with most of its sand for domestic use. Gilbert's Pit is the only remnant of this industry which has not been built over.

== Religious sites ==
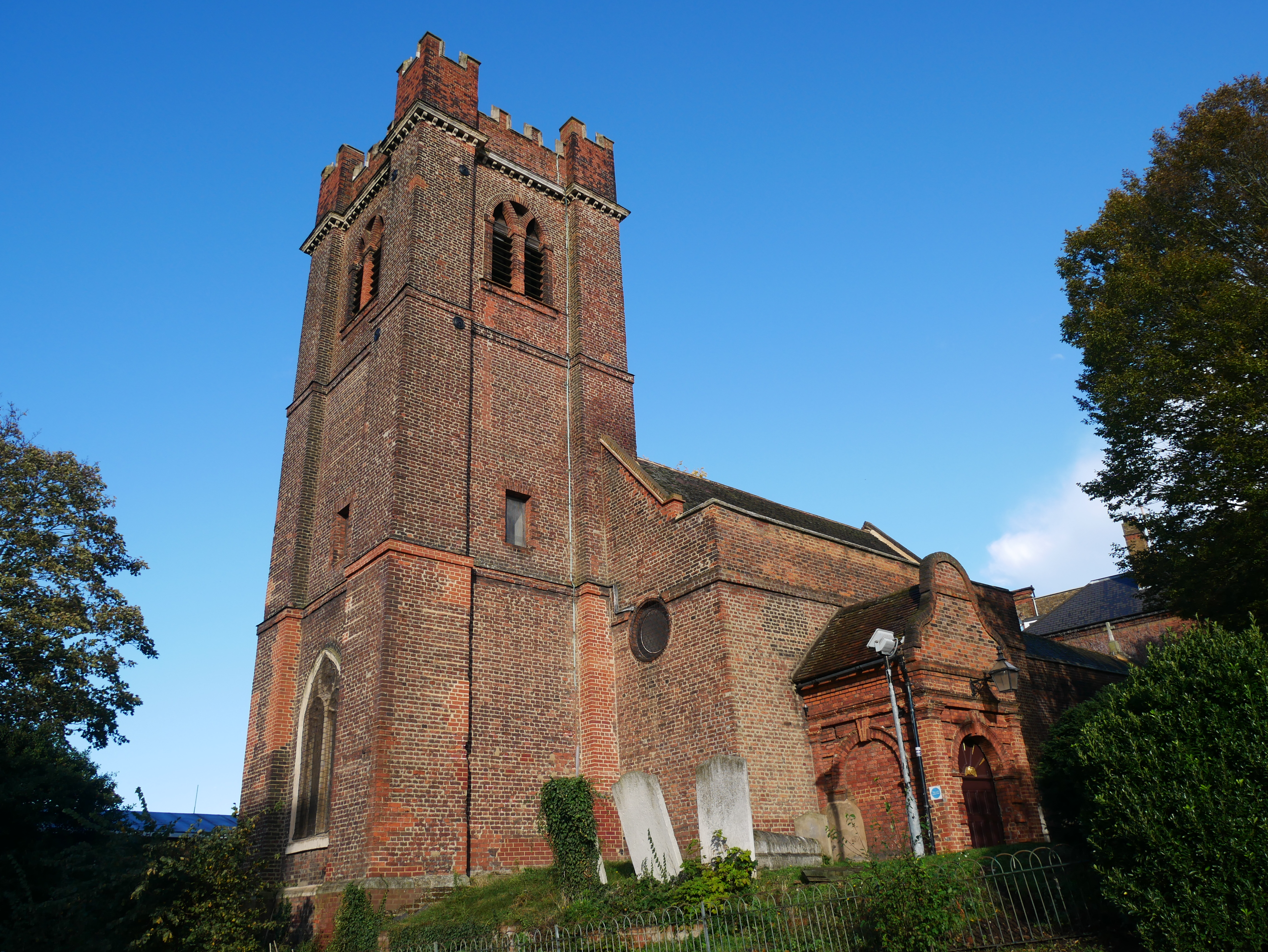
The Church of Saint Luke in Charlton

The first recorded place of worship in Charlton is St Luke's Church, originally a chalk and flint building known to have existed in the 11th century. Rebuilt in the Jacobean style in 1630, it is now the parish church of a Church of England parish in the Modern Catholic tradition. The building was expanded with a new organ chamber and chancel in 1840, and new vestries in 1956. The church is listed as grade 2*, indicating a structure of 'more than special interest'. It is the burial place of several generations of the lords of the manor of Charlton, and of murdered British prime minister Spencer Perceval.

A second Anglican church, dedicated to St Thomas, and known as St Thomas Old Charlton, was built in 1848–50. Designed in the Romanesque style by architect Joseph Gwilt and his son John Sebastian Gwilt, it was consecrated on 31 July 1850. It remains part of the Church of England and shares a Rector with St Luke's, the parishes combined make up Charlton United Benefice. The building is sometimes used by the British Orthodox Church congregation of St Thomas the Apostle; the building is grade II listed. A third Anglican church, dedicated to the Holy Trinity, was built in New Charlton in 1894, designed by John Rowland. It was listed in 1973, but was declared redundant in 1974 and demolished in 1975 to be replaced by a block of flats.

The third Anglican Church in the area is St Richard's. Located the corner of Swallowfield Road and Sundorne Road, St Richard's was originally built as a Congregationalist Tin Mission Hut. It was later handed over to the Church of England who continued to let it out a Congregationalist group. In 1958 it was rebuilt as a permanent structure designed by Ralph Covell.

The Catholic church of Our Lady of Grace was established by the Assumptionists Order. They settled in Charlton in 1903 after being expelled from France in 1900 due to suppression of Holy Orders. The first nuns moved into Highcombe House and set up a mission in Charlton. The current church was built in 1905 and celebrated its centenary on 17 September 2005 with a concelebrated ecumenical mass, led by Archbishop Kevin McDonald and parish priest, Fr. Michael Leach. The church has strong historic links with the Irish community in south east London, evident in the statue of Saint Patrick on display inside. The current presbytery (Highcombe House) was once the home of William Henry Barlow (1812–1902), the eminent 19th century engineer, who designed St Pancras railway station and for whom English Heritage erected a blue plaque in recognition; it is also grade II listed.

Other churches in the area include Charlton Tabernacle of the New Testament Church of God on Charlton Church Lane; the Anglican church of St Richard; a United Reformed Church on Wyndcliff Road; and several evangelical free churches in and around New Charlton. Charlton also has a small mosque providing services for men and women in the Bareilvi Sufi tradition.

== Transport ==
=== London Buses ===
Charlton is served by London Buses routes 53, 54, 161, 177, 180, 380, 422, 472 (which is then going to be SL11 from January 2026), 486, N1 and N53. Part of the area is served by route SL4.

=== London Underground ===
The nearest station is North Greenwich on the Jubilee line.

=== National Rail ===
The nearest station is Charlton for Southeastern services towards Barnehurst, Crayford, Dartford, Gillingham, London Cannon Street and London Charing Cross and Govia Thameslink Railway services to north Kent, as well as services to St Pancras, St Albans City, Luton and Luton Airport.

=== Road network ===
Charlton is located between the A206 to the north and the A207 to the south. The southern approach of the Blackwall Tunnel crossing of the River Thames is located to the west, while the South Circular Road lies some way to the east.

A Metropolitan Police car pound is located in west Charlton, off Eastcombe Avenue.

== Sport ==
- Charlton is best known as the home of Charlton Athletic F.C. and Charlton Athletic Women F.C. The clubs play at The Valley (a former chalk pit) situated to the north of the village, close to the main road and railway line.
- The Rectory Field, until 2016 home of Blackheath Rugby Club, is on the border of Blackheath and Charlton.
- Charlton Lido is south of Charlton village, at the western end of Hornfair Park.
- The London Marathon course, which starts on Blackheath, loops eastwards through Charlton to Woolwich before turning west along Woolwich Road.

== See also ==
- List of people from Greenwich
- List of schools in Greenwich
