= Angerstein Wharf =

Coordinates: 51.4936°N 0.0205°E

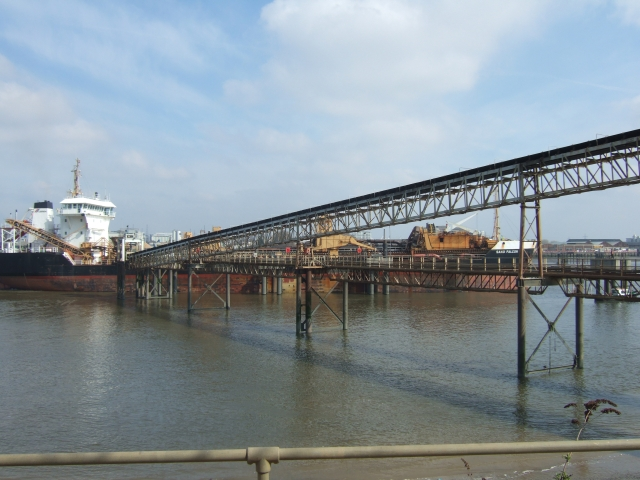
- A ship at Angerstein Wharf

- Location within Greater London
- London borough: Greenwich
- Ceremonial county: Greater London
- Region: London
- Country: England
- Sovereign state: United Kingdom
- Post town: LONDON
- Postcode district: SE7
- Dialling code: 020
- Police: Metropolitan
- Fire: London
- Ambulance: London
- London Assembly: Greenwich and Lewisham

Angerstein Wharf is an industrial area and location of a marine construction aggregate and an associated cement facility and freight station in the Port of London, operated by the Cemex company, located on the south bank of the Bugsby's Reach of the River Thames in both Greenwich and Charlton, within the Royal Borough of Greenwich. It has safeguarded wharf status.

== History ==
The wharf was named after John Julius Angerstein (1732–1823), a local land owner who made his fortune in the East Indian trade as well as having West Indian business links, including a third share in a slave plantation in Grenada. His art collection was bought in 1824 to form the nucleus of the National Gallery, London. He built a 1 mile (1.6 km) long railway line from the line that runs from Blackheath to Charlton. When originally built, the railway junction faced Blackheath but the junction now faces Charlton station. The branch was leased to the South Eastern Railway from 30 October 1852 to 1898 when they bought it outright. The company established its signal works at the location although according to an 1895 map the route towards Blackheath had been disconnected. This area is referred to as the Angerstein Triangle but the date of the signal works closing is unknown (believed to be in the early 1980s).

When opened the wharf had a river frontage of 755 feet (230 m) and could accommodate ships of up to 1,500 tons.

=== Associated industries ===
Between 1820 and 1930 dredging contractors Flowers and Everett operated on the site and operated a narrow gauge system with three locomotives. The steel firm Redpath Dorman Long operated a steel fabrication plant on the site between 1903 and 1978. Another steel company - the Greenwich Metal Works - operated on the site between 1913 and 1976. Both companies operated privately owned shunting locomotives.

Between 1919 and 1967 a large glass bottling factory operated by the United Glass Bottle Manufacturers was based on the site.

Adjacent to the branch was the London County Council's central tram repair depot (opened 1909) which was served by a siding off the branch. Another mile and a half siding served the South Metropolitan Gasworks, whilst a privately run firm called Christies supplied railway sleepers and had an extensive internal rail network on their site. By 1925 some 30,000 tons of sleepers and significant numbers of telegraph poles were being produced from this site. There was also a general goods facility dealing with manure, steel, rails, fertilisers, coal, coke, stone, flour, sand, slates, timber and petrol.

In 1886 the South Metropolitan Gas Company opened the East Greenwich Works. Coal Gas production ceased in 1968 and the chemical by-products plant closed eight years later. This site is now (in 2014) occupied by the Millennium Dome. The site had its own fleet of standard gauge locomotives as well as a small narrow gauge railway.

The 1969 Railway Control Diagram showed a line along the wharf served by wagon turntables as well as the following companies having sidings on the site:

- A-A Oil (Anglo-American?)
- Shell-Mex and B.P.
- C A Harveys
- Christies
- Renwick Wilton's
- London Transport Executive
- South Eastern Gas Board Siding

There were two engine sheds shown on the diagram (for BP and A-A) suggesting these companies had their own shunting locomotives on the site. From the overbridge belonging to the Greenwich railway line, the line was equipped with an overhead electrical supply rather than the standard third rail supply. This was for safety reasons and locomotives of British Rail Class 71 were equipped to use this.

=== Passenger traffic ===
Passenger trains were limited to enthusiast specials and photographic evidence of one run on 29 March 1958 can be found in Fig 65 of 'Charing Cross to Dartford' by Vic Mitchell and Keith Smith. On 10 January 1987 'The Blue Circular' railtour traversed the line formed of a Class 202 DEMU. The 'Orange Pippin' railtour of 30 August 2003 was worked by two class 66 locomotives.

=== Later history ===
During the 1970s the Angerstein Wharf site was used as a railhead to receive large stone boulders from Caldon Low (Staffordshire) in connection with the building of the Thames Barrier.

Between 1963 and 1987 the Thames Metal Company operated a scrap yard on the site and this site was then taken over by Day Aggregates in 1993 and is the location of the current facility.

== Current use ==
Since 1990 the site has been used almost exclusively used for loading and unloading of sea-dredged aggregates; as of 2014, the operator was Aggregate Industries. The Thames Path passes by Angerstein Wharf, with several conveyors passing over it, and dust of cement and sand covering part of it.

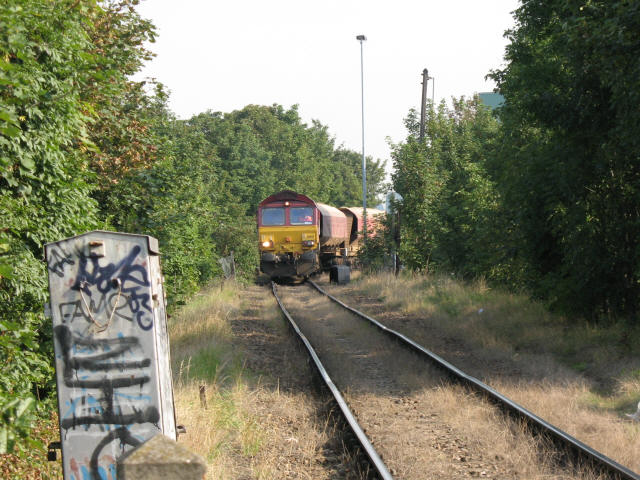
Aggregates train from the wharf, 2007

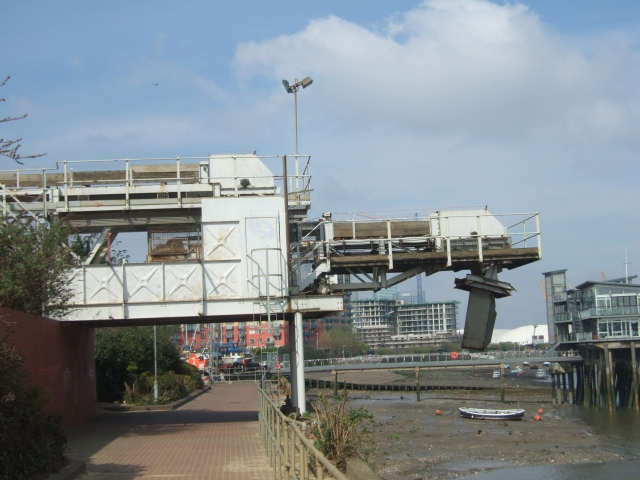
Conveyors handling cargoes of bulk aggregate, 2010

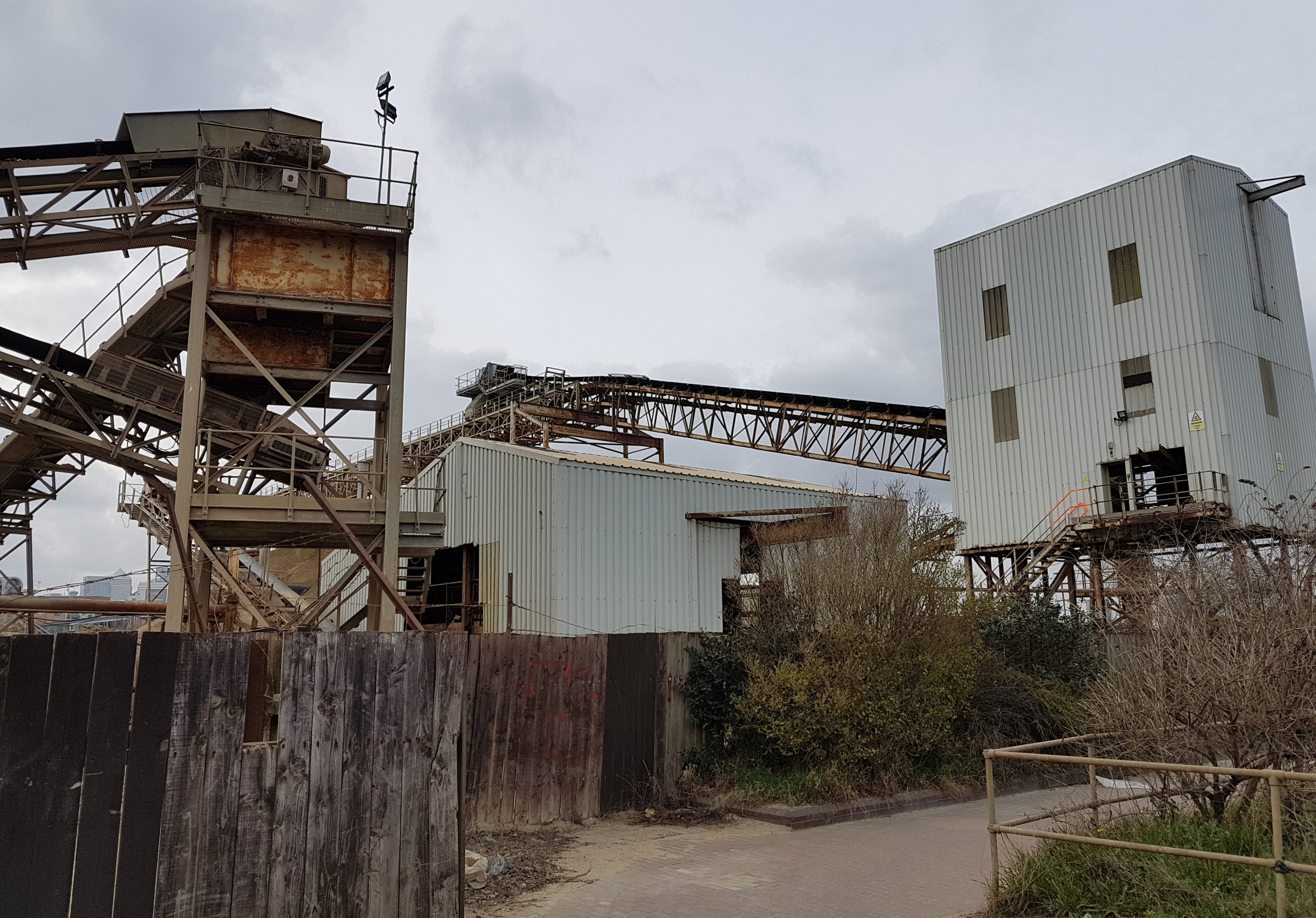
Aggregate Industries, 2018

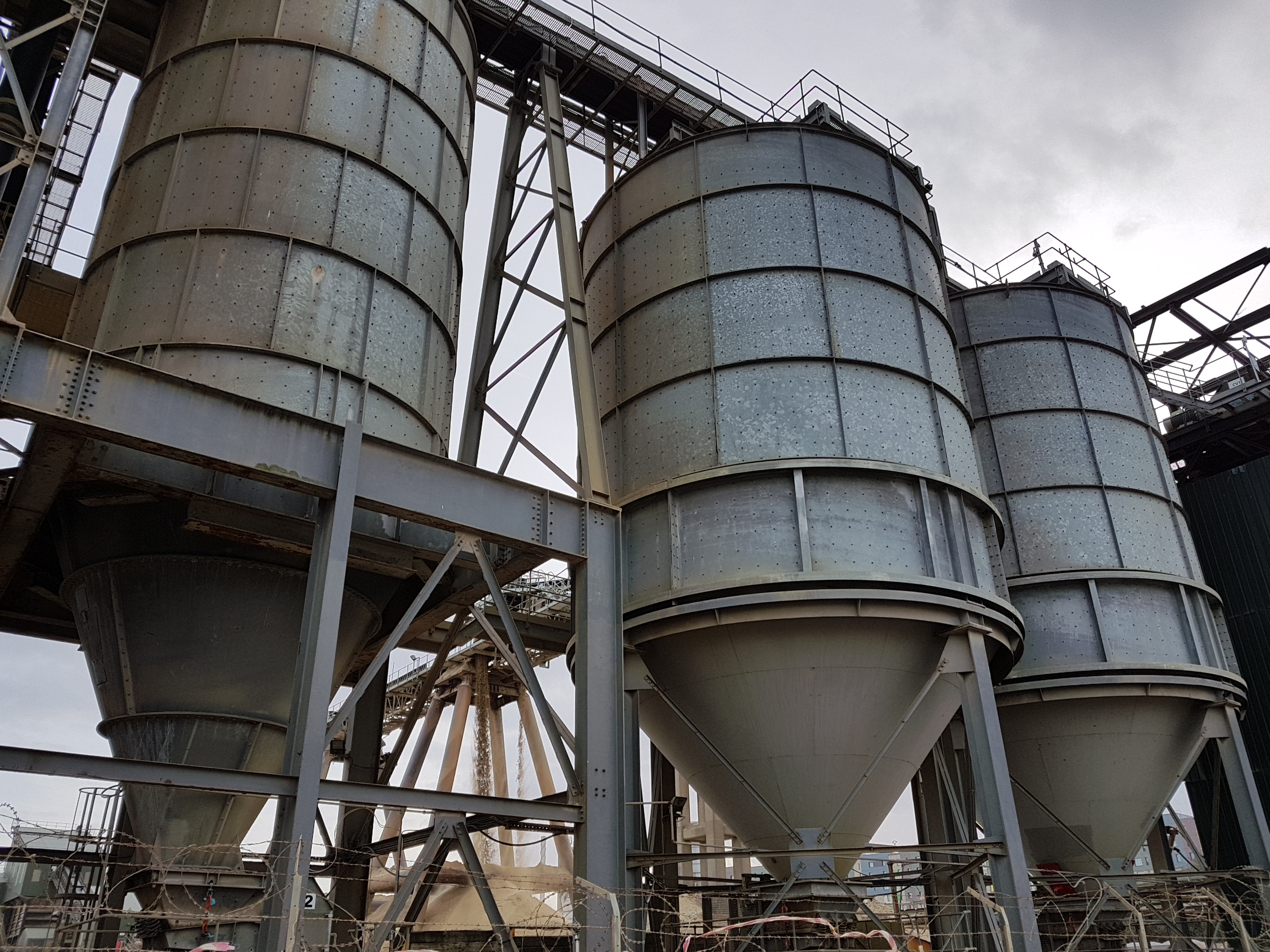
Silos, 2018

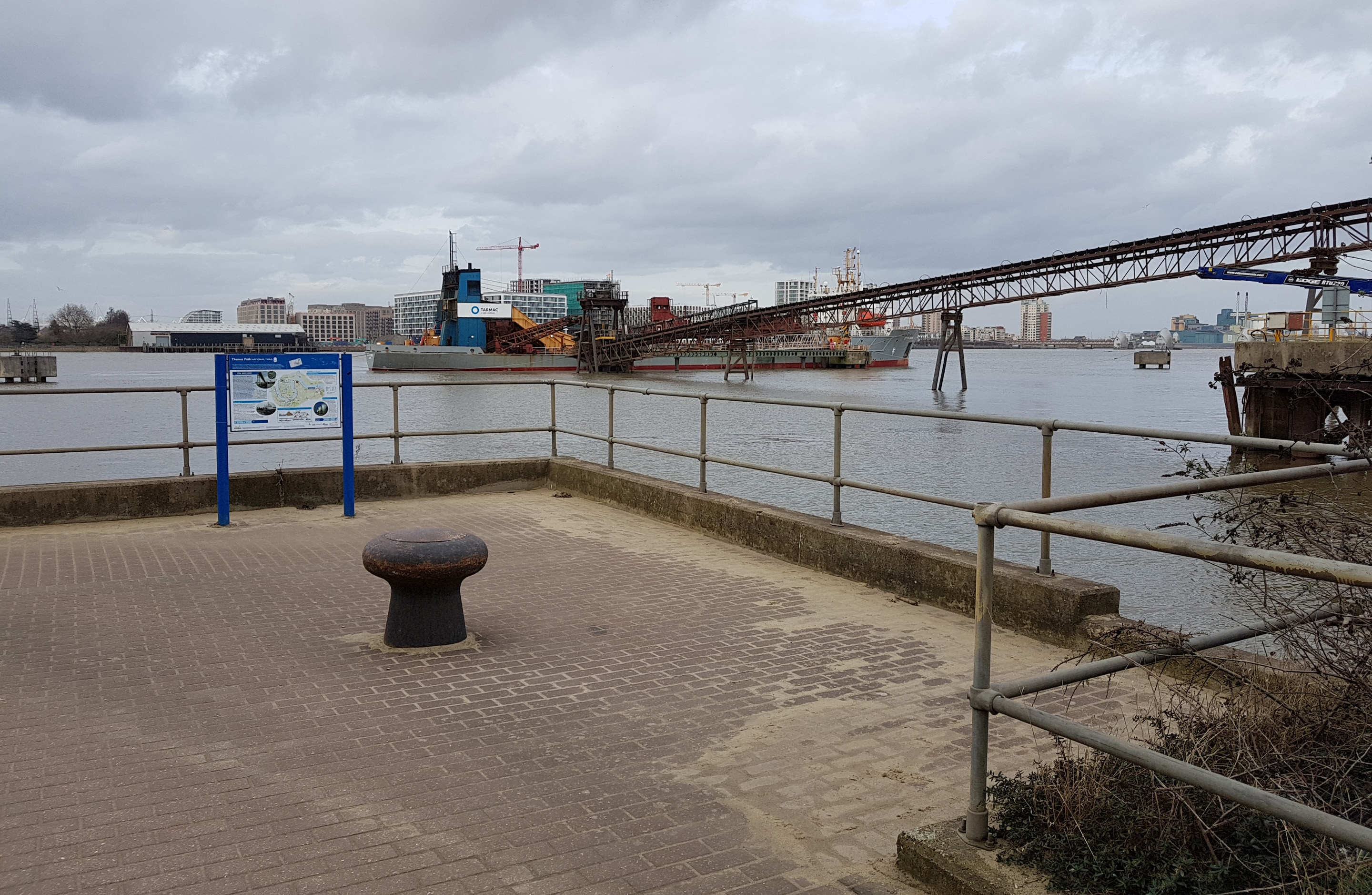
Thames Path at Angerstein Wharf, 2018

== See also ==
- Charlton Riverside
- Port of London
- Thames Path
