= George Oguntade =

Nigerian jurist

- Born: George Adesola Oguntade; March 10, 1940 (age 86); Epe, Lagos State, Nigeria
- Education: Holborn College of Law; Nigerian Law School
- Occupations: Jurist, Diplomat
- Years active: 1966 – 2010
- Spouse(s): Modupe Oguntade (2nd wife, no children together)
- Children: Abosede Snr, Abimbola, George Folu (SAN), Deola, Daniel, Yetunde, Abosede Jnr, Jide

George Adesola Oguntade (CFR, CON) (born March 10, 1940), is a retired Nigerian jurist who served as Justice of the Supreme Court of Nigeria from May 19, 2004 to May 10, 2010 and was Nigeria's High Commissioner to the United Kingdom.

== Early life and education ==
George Oguntade was born in Epe, Lagos State where he completed his basic formal education. He graduated from Holborn College of Law in 1964 after studying Law before he proceeded to the Nigerian Law School in 1965 and was eventually called to the Nigerian Bar on January 15, 1966.

== Career ==
Oguntade commenced his legal career as a court clerk at the High Court of Justice, Ibadan and in September 1980 was appointed a Judge of the Lagos High Court after being involved in private legal practices at the Lagos Bar for 14 years. Between September 1987 and May 2004, George served as Presiding Justice for several State Court of Appeal in Nigeria until his appointment as Justice of the Supreme Court of Nigeria on May 19, 2004.

Having attained the statutory retirement age of 70 years, George Oguntade retired from the Supreme Court Bench on May 10, 2010. On September 16, 2015, George was appointed Chancellor of the Lagos State University Governing Council by Akinwunmi Ambode.

George Oguntade assumed duty of High Commissioner of the Federal Republic of Nigeria to the United Kingdom on 9 October 2017.

== Awards and recognitions ==
- Commander of the Order of the Niger – 2010
- Commander of the Federal Republic – 2010

== Bibliography ==
- George Oguntade (2009). Dissenting Judgments and Judicial Law Making. ISBN 978-978-8407-07-2.
