= Holborn College =

Educational institution in London, England

Coordinates: 51.4918°N 0.0421°E

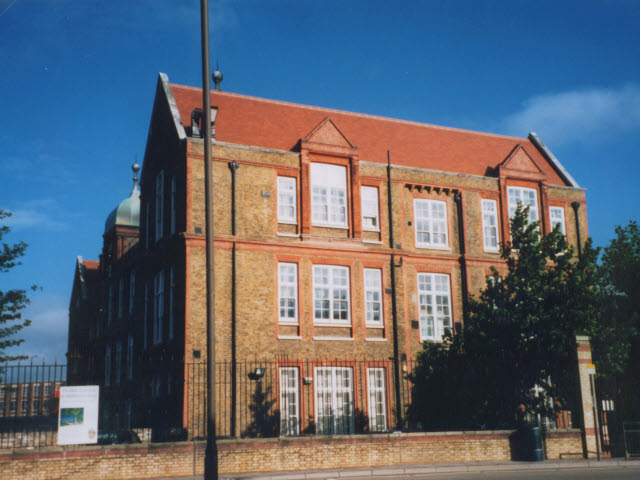
Holborn College in 2004

Kaplan Holborn College was a college of higher education in London, England, specialising in accounting, finance, law and business.

It was originally established as Holborn Law College in 1969 to prepare young lawyers from overseas for the University of London International Programme – and then Wolverhampton University External – LLB exams and received the Queen's Award for Export Achievement in 1982 for its role in international education. For a short time it was based at 200 Greyhound Road in Fulham, where it offered part-time courses for England & Wales Solicitors' Finals as well as certificated courses in individual degree-level law subjects.

The best-known course, with the largest proportion nationwide of successful students, was the old-style English Bar Examination (also known as Bar Finals) for British Commonwealth and US exemptions-seeking Bar students (approx. 70% of the intake) as well as for UK Intending Non-Practitioners (approx. 30% of the cohort) until the exam was phased out in 2000. The loss of the well-subscribed part- and full-time courses deprived the college of a vital source of revenue. The College thereafter received no Bar Council validation to run the new, unified Practitioners' Bar Vocational Course (BVC), which required audio-recording studio-facilities for training in practical advocacy, conference and negotiation skills.

The school then moved to a site along the A206 (Woolwich Road), close to the Thames Barrier, in Charlton Riverside in South-East London. The building of 1894–1896 had been previously used by Maryon Park School and had been extended twice, first in 1909–1910, then in 1914–1915.

In 2005 the college became part of Kaplan Inc., one of the largest international private education providers. Kaplan every year provided education and training to a million students across 30 countries. In March 2013, the college rebranded from "Holborn College" to "Kaplan Holborn College". Kaplan Holborn College specialised in law and business, offering foundation, undergraduate, top-up and postgraduate courses in association with leading UK universities such as Anglia Ruskin University and the University of the West of England.

The college had a diverse mix of students from the UK and the rest of the world, in particular from Africa, China, Pakistan, Bangladesh, the Caribbean and Eastern Europe. There was no on-site accommodation provision for students under 18; most students stayed in two nearby hostels or with host families. Three- and four-year undergraduate degrees last cost £5,995 per annum. Two-year degrees were charged at £9,000. In 2012 the Woolwich Road premises were acquired by Greenwich Council. The college continued at Borough High Street. Kaplan Holborn College had received a commendable outcome from the QAA in June 2013. However, in September 2015 Kaplan Holborn College closed its Borough High Street campus.

The old school building at Woolwich Road is now used by Windrush Primary School. On the adjacent former playgrounds of this school new buildings were constructed for the short-lived Royal Greenwich University Technical College, which opened in 2013. In 2016 this became Royal Greenwich Trust School.
