= Royal Greenwich Trust School =

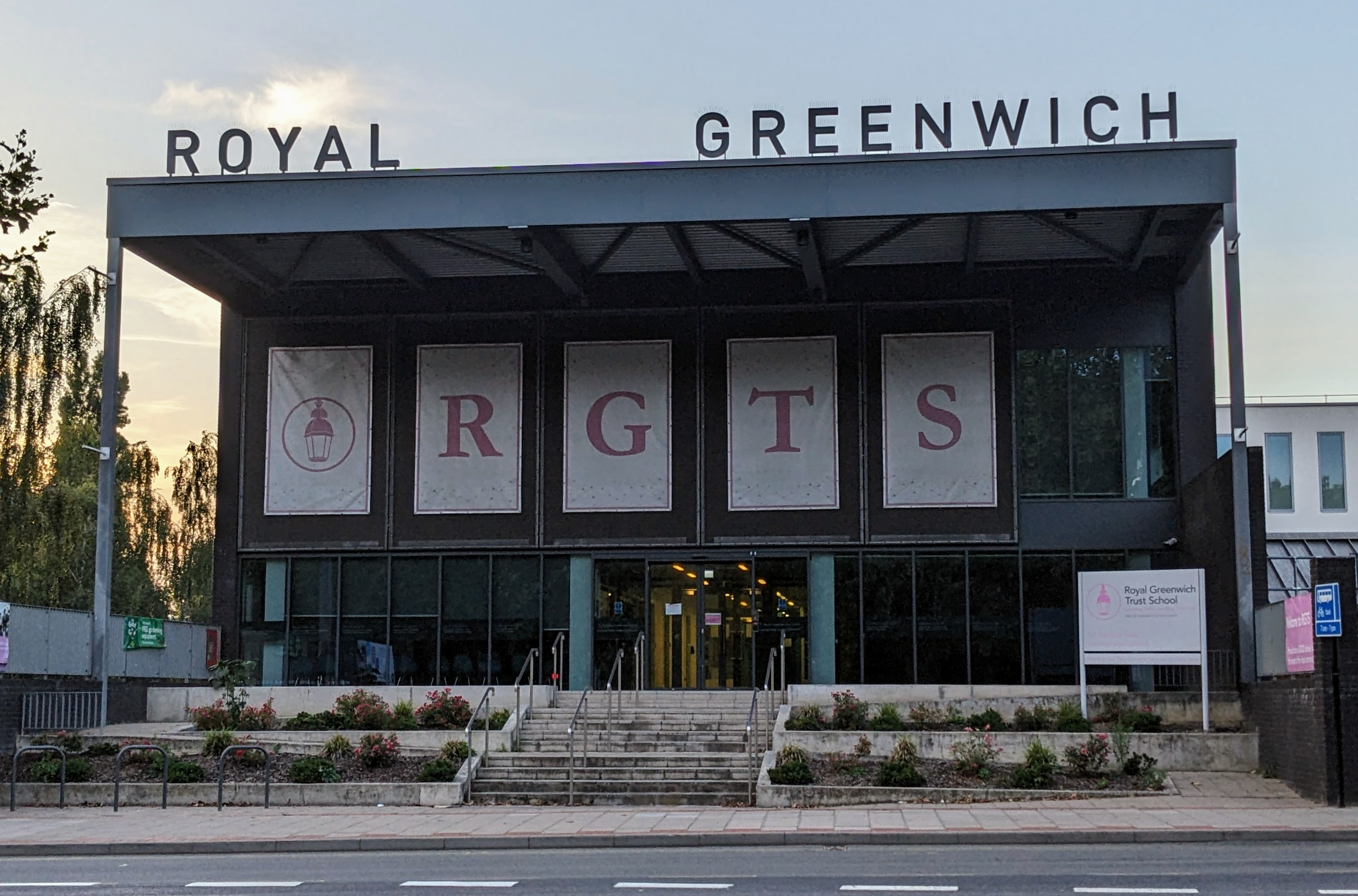

Location
- 765 Woolwich Road; Charlton Riverside, London, SE7 8LJ; England; 51.4916°N 0.0413°E

Information
- Type: Free school
- Established: 2016
- Department for Education URN: 143927 Tables
- Ofsted: Reports
- Principal: Caroline Toye
- Gender: Mixed
- Age: 11 to 19
- Website: http://www.rgtrustschool.net/

Royal Greenwich Trust School is a free school which opened in the Charlton Riverside area of the Royal Borough of Greenwich in London, England in September 2016. The campus is located along the A206 near the banks of the River Thames, close to the Thames Barrier. It is adjacent to Windrush Primary School and Maryon Park.

== History ==
The school is located on the site of the former University Technical College, which opened in 2013 and closed in 2016.

Former University Technical College

The University of Greenwich was the university sponsor of the Royal Greenwich UTC. Other sponsors included Transport for London, Wates Group and Greenwich London Borough Council. The curriculum of the UTC was structured around a series of business projects developed by the sponsors.

It specialised in engineering and construction with underpinning themes of transport and new "green" technologies. Pupils aged 14 to 16 studied a compulsory core of GCSEs, as well additional GCSEs and BTECs that focused on engineering, construction and related fields. Sixth form students were to have options to study A Levels, BTECs and City and Guilds qualifications which were mainly focused on scientific and technical subjects.

The UTC had an initial intake of students aged 14 and 16 (academic years 10 and 12) in 2013, and planned to expand to accommodate students aged 14 to 19 over the following two years. The UTC’s student numbers failed to increase as planned, and it closed in 2016.

Royal Greenwich Trust School opening

Royal Greenwich Trust School (RGTS) was opened on the site, following additional building works to extend the age range from 14-19 to its current 11-19. The building works were supported by the London Borough of Greenwich and retain some of the previous capability to teach technical subjects such as engineering and construction.

== Curriculum ==
RGTS offers a curriculum in Key Stage 3 (for learners aged 11–14). For Key Stage 4, students complete GCSEs in core subjects including English, maths and science, alongside optional subjects ranging from art, music and drama through BTEC Sport, business and engineering.

== Sixth Form ==
RGTS has a sixth form provision for 16-19 year olds. Currently this comprises business, engineering and construction courses at level 3.

== Admissions and student characteristics ==
As of September 2023, the school had 798 students on roll. The school is oversubscribed for September 2024.

The school serves the local community and its catchment spans a wide area around the school, with diverse primary feeder schools. The school has 42% of its students eligible for free school meals, and caters to students with a range of special educational needs and disabilities.

== Ofsted ==
The most recent inspection visit (11 and 12 October 2022) graded the school as Good overall and Good in all categories.

== University Schools Trust (UST) ==
RGTS is a member of the UST group of schools, all based in east London. It is a partnership of schools, universities and public and private sector bodies.
