= Charlton Riverside =

Coordinates: 51.491939°N 0.037658°E

Charlton Riverside (New Charlton)
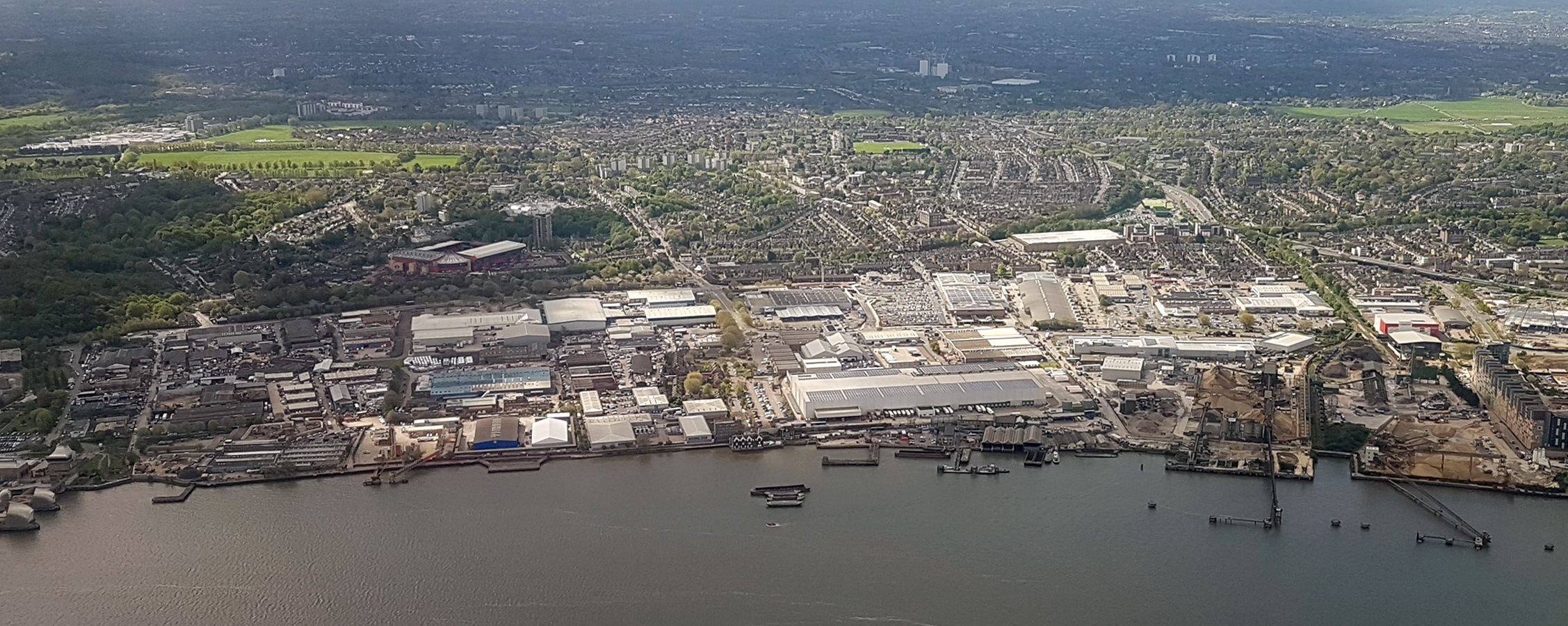
- Aerial view of Charlton Riverside, seen from the north looking south, 2018

- Location within Greater London
- London borough: Greenwich
- Ceremonial county: Greater London
- Region: London
- Country: England
- Sovereign state: United Kingdom
- Post town: LONDON
- Postcode district: SE7
- Dialling code: 020
- Police: Metropolitan
- Fire: London
- Ambulance: London
- London Assembly: Greenwich and Lewisham

Charlton Riverside, previously known as New Charlton, is the area along the south bank of the river Thames at Charlton, London, which forms part of the Royal Borough of Greenwich. It was formerly a primarily industrial zone, known for the glass and rope making industries, but is now an area of regeneration.

== Geography ==
The area formerly known as New Charlton is situated in the Greenwich wards of Peninsula and Woolwich Riverside. It is bounded by the river Thames in the north and the A206 (Woolwich Road) in the south. On the west it borders the Greenwich Peninsula at Horn Lane and Horn Link Way. On the east it borders Woolwich at the Thames Barrier and Eastmoor Street.

The Westminster Estate, the area between the Thames Barrier and Warspite Road, has at times been referred to as part of New Charlton. The Survey of London however regards it as a part of Woolwich, since it is situated in the historic parish of Woolwich. From 1863 until 1968 this was the site of Siemens Brothers, where many who were living across the road in New Charlton worked. This is also where Charlton Athletic F.C. played their first football matches at Siemens Meadow from 1905 until 1907. In the Charlton Riverside Masterplan SPD the Westminster Estate is considered a part of Charlton Riverside. The SPD also includes Charlton railway station and a small section of Charlton Church Lane.

== History ==
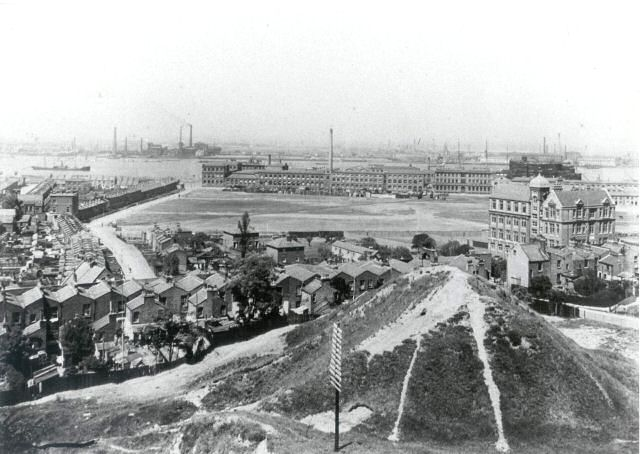
New Charlton in 1905, as seen from Maryon Park. On the left: housing along Hardens Manor Way, now Eastmoor Street, all since demolished. To the right, along Woolwich Road: Maryon Park School (1896), now Windrush Primary School. In the centre: Charlton Athletic's earliest ground. Beyond: factory buildings of Siemens Brothers

Industrial development on the flat land adjoining the Thames at Charlton Riverside began in the middle of the 19th century, especially after the opening of a private railway branch line to Angerstein Wharf in 1852. A notable establishment was the Siemens Brothers Telegraph Works opened in 1863 (although the factory was largely in Woolwich). The company manufactured two new transatlantic cables in the 1880s, and contributed to the PLUTO project in World War II. Since the 1960s the area had sunk into industrial decline, with most of the original factories closing (Siemens Brothers in 1968).

== Recent history; regeneration ==
There have been several regeneration projects in the area, starting in the 1980s, after the opening of the Thames Barrier. It was identified as part of an Opportunity Area by the Mayor of London in 2008 and, more clearly, in the London Plan of 2011. Regeneration of the area is now focused on the Charlton Riverside Masterplan agreed by the Royal Borough of Greenwich in April 2012 and updated in February 2017. The masterplan envisages a series of new neighbourhoods with medium-rise housing and a significant proportion of family homes. A network of streets and open spaces will be shaped by the area's industrial heritage.

In 2013, Royal Greenwich UTC opened as part of this plan. The college failed to attract sufficient numbers of students and in 2016 was converted into a free school, Royal Greenwich Trust School. Adjacent to it, also on Woolwich Road and officially in Woolwich, is Windrush Primary School, formerly Maryon Park School, from the 1990s until 2015 Holborn College.

Recent commercial developments include the Greenwich Shopping Park, the Peninsula Retail Park and Stone Lake Retail Park. A Sainsbury's superstore opened in 2015 between Woolwich Road and Bugsby's Way. West of Charlton Riverside, an IKEA store opened in 2019.

== Description ==
=== Northern part ===
In total there are around 400 businesses in Charlton Riverside (including the section east of the Thames Barrier). Among the few remaining industrial facilities on the riverside is a Tarmac asphalt plant (west of the Barrier) and the construction aggregate and ready mix cement works of Aggregate Industries at Angerstein Wharf next to Greenwich Peninsula. In between are industrial units, a large Sainsbury's distribution centre, west of Anchor & Hope Lane (rebuilt and expanded in 2012 and re-opened by deputy prime minister Nick Clegg in 2013), and, on the riverside, a Cory boatyard.

The southern end of the Thames Barrier which opened in 1983 is at Charlton Riverside, near the northern end of Eastmoor Street. The Thames Path was laid out here shortly afterwards but officially only opened in 1996. Around 800m west of the Barrier, the last functioning public house in the area, the Anchor & Hope (2 Riverside Walk/Anchor and Hope Lane), closed in March 2025 and its future remains uncertain. A set of watermen's stairs has survived here, reconstructed in concrete. At 32 Hardens Manor Way/Eastmoor Street, the former Lads of the Village pub - later named the Thames Barrier Arms - is now a veterinary clinic. A former industrial site near the Thames Barrier houses an indoor paintball facility.

In August 2026, a 182-home affordable housing scheme in Eastmoor Street was approved. Hyde Housing Association has consent for around 1,200 homes in Charlton Riverside. New public spaces, commercial uses and improved access to the Thames Path are also planned.

=== Southern part ===
The southern part of Charlton Riverside along Woolwich Road and Bugsby's Road is now dominated by shopping centres, supermarkets and retail warehouses. Large retailers are Asda, Sainsbury's, Makro, Argos and Marks & Spencer. In the south-west corner, around Woolwich Road and Aldeburgh Street there is some housing, as well as along Anchor and Hope Lane. East of this street is Ropery Business Park with several small business.

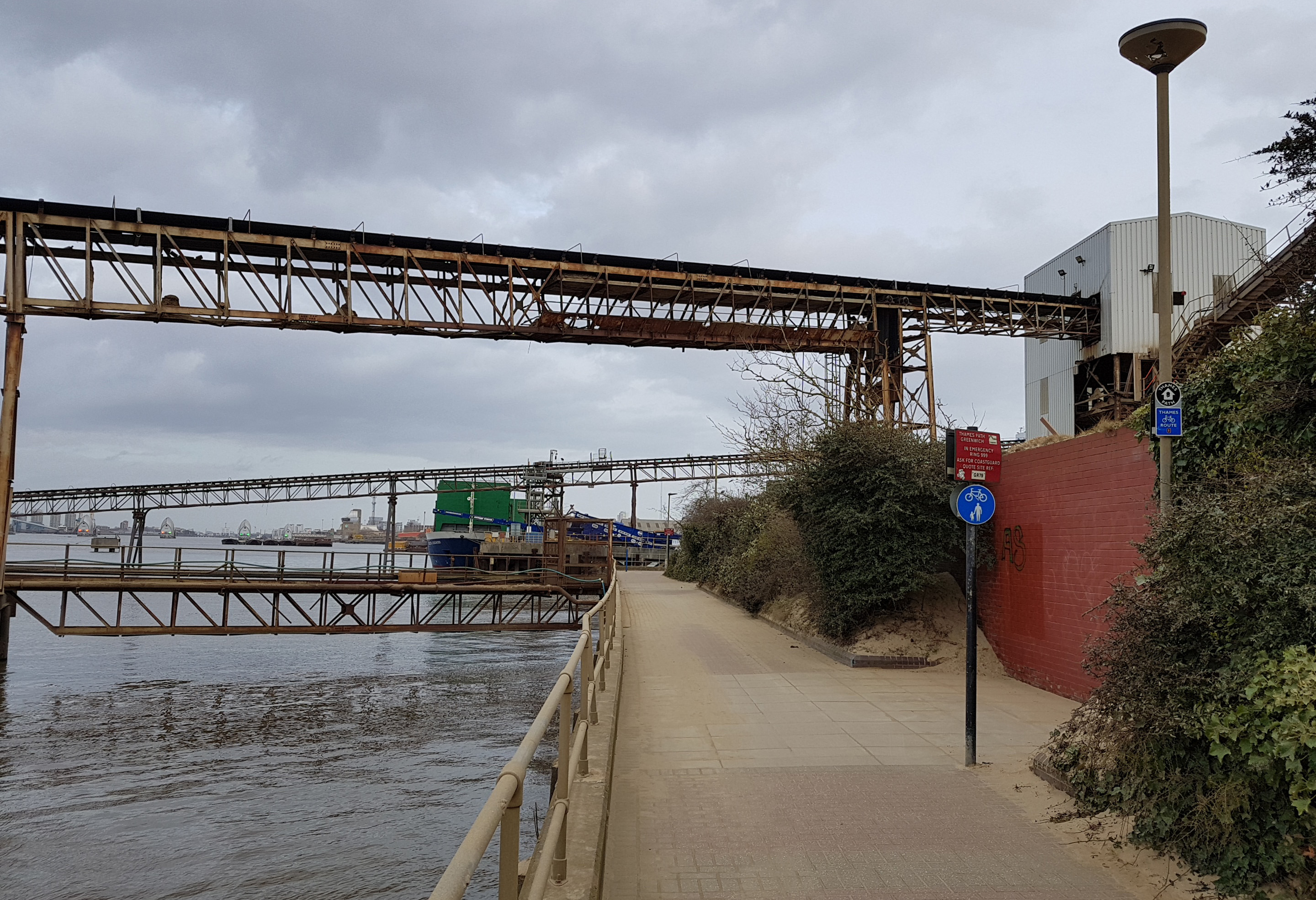
Conveyors handling bulk aggregate

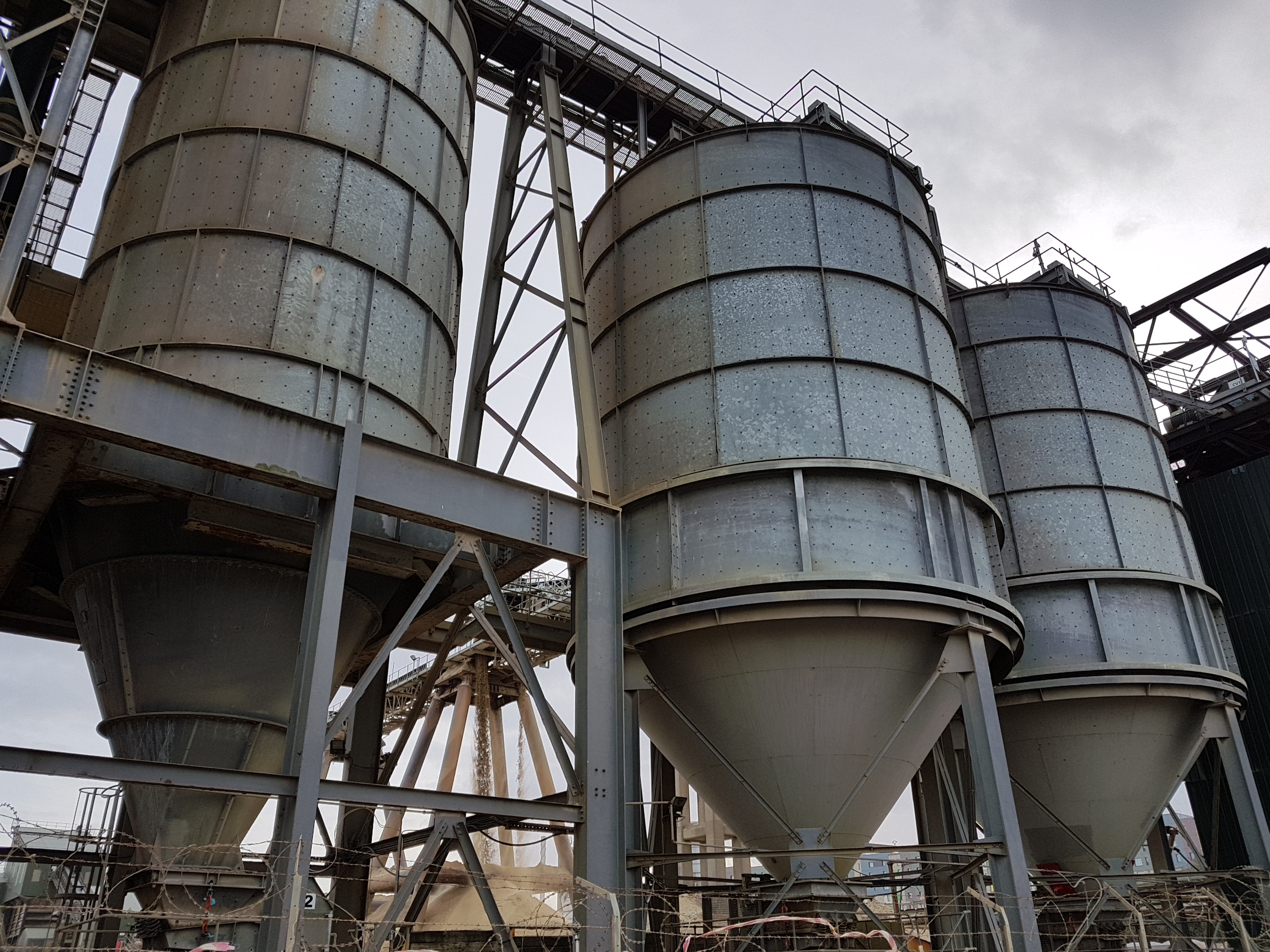
Cemex Silos at Angerstein Wharf

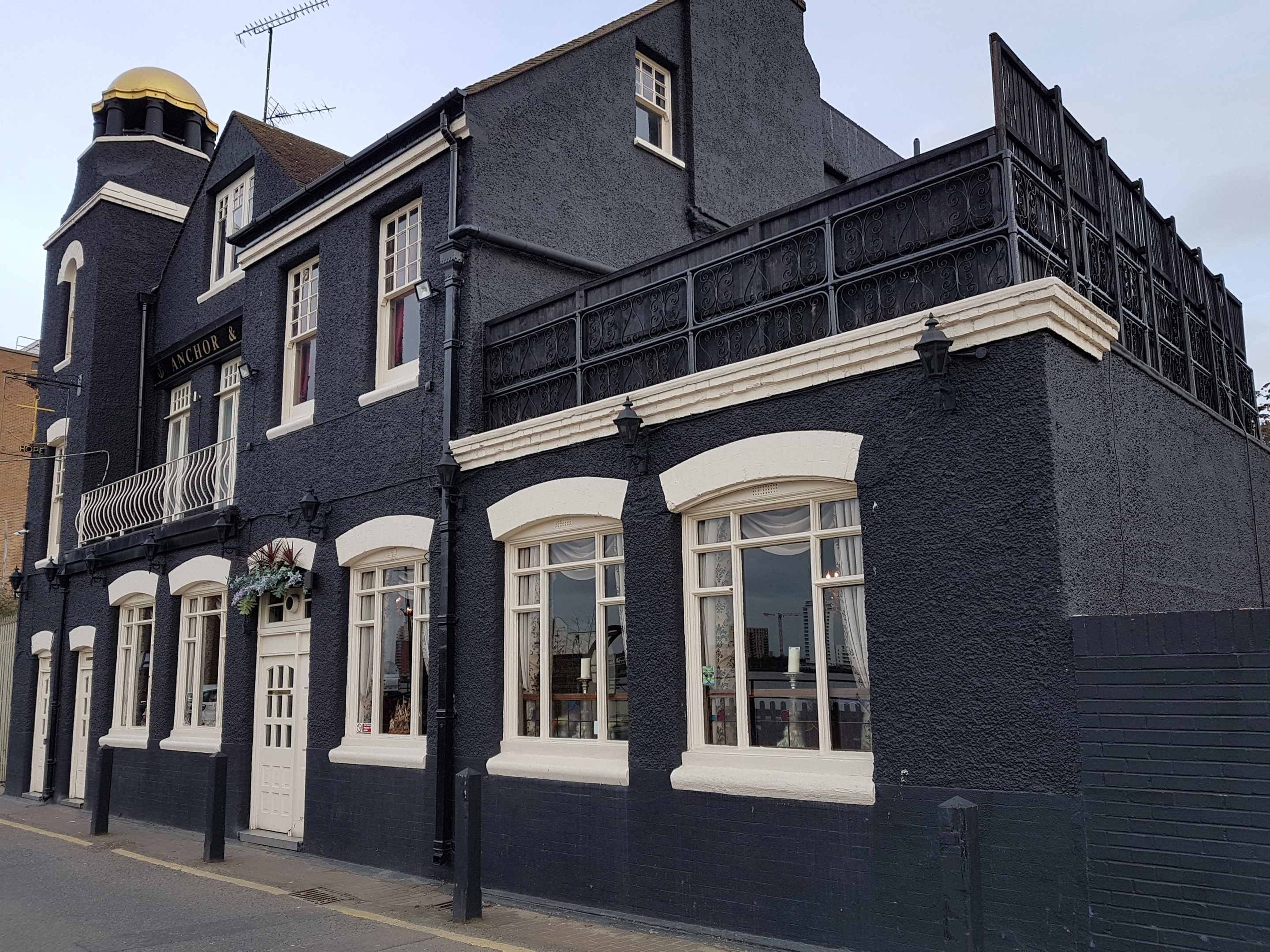
The Anchor & Hope public house

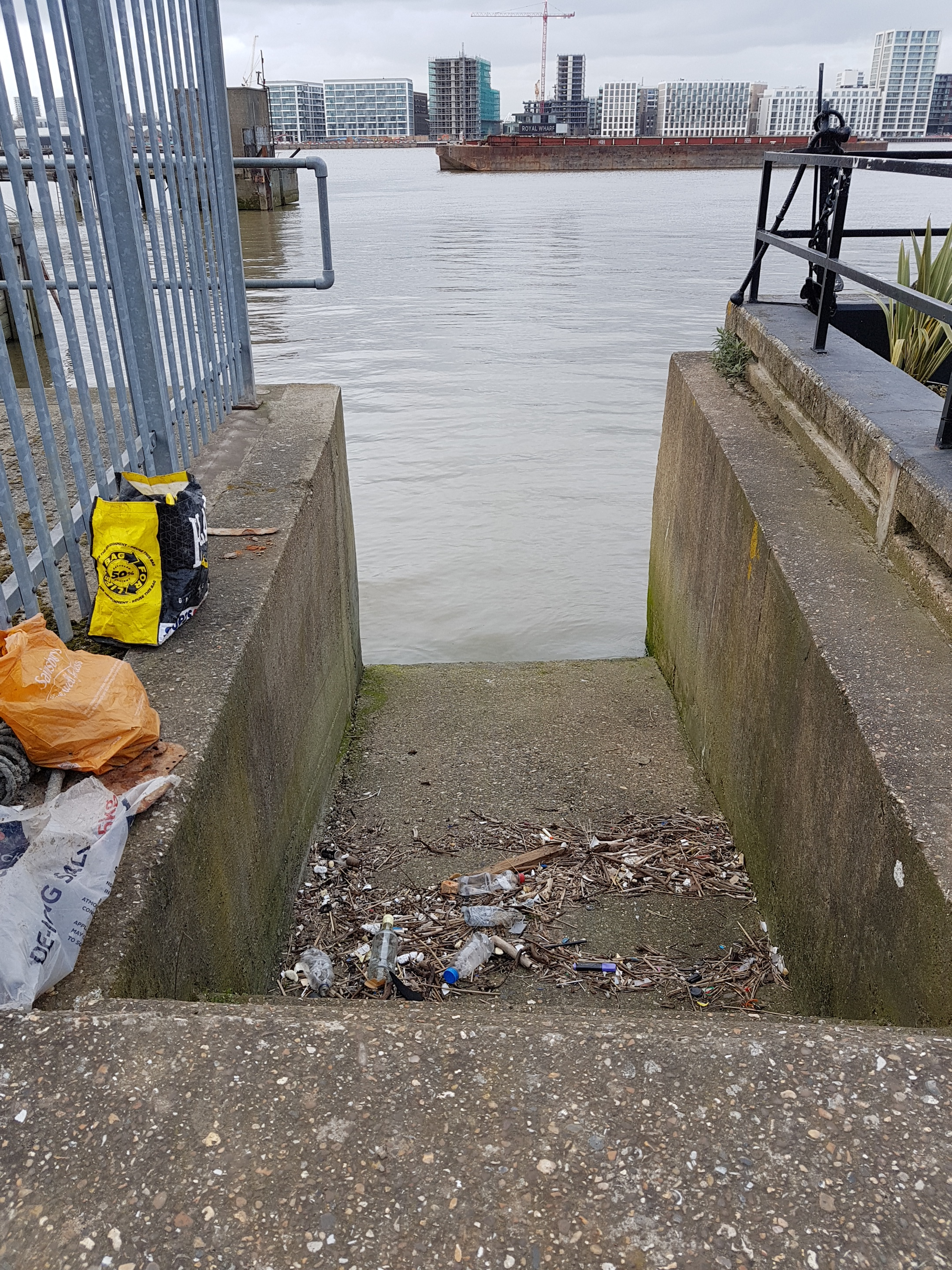
Reconstructed watermen's stairs

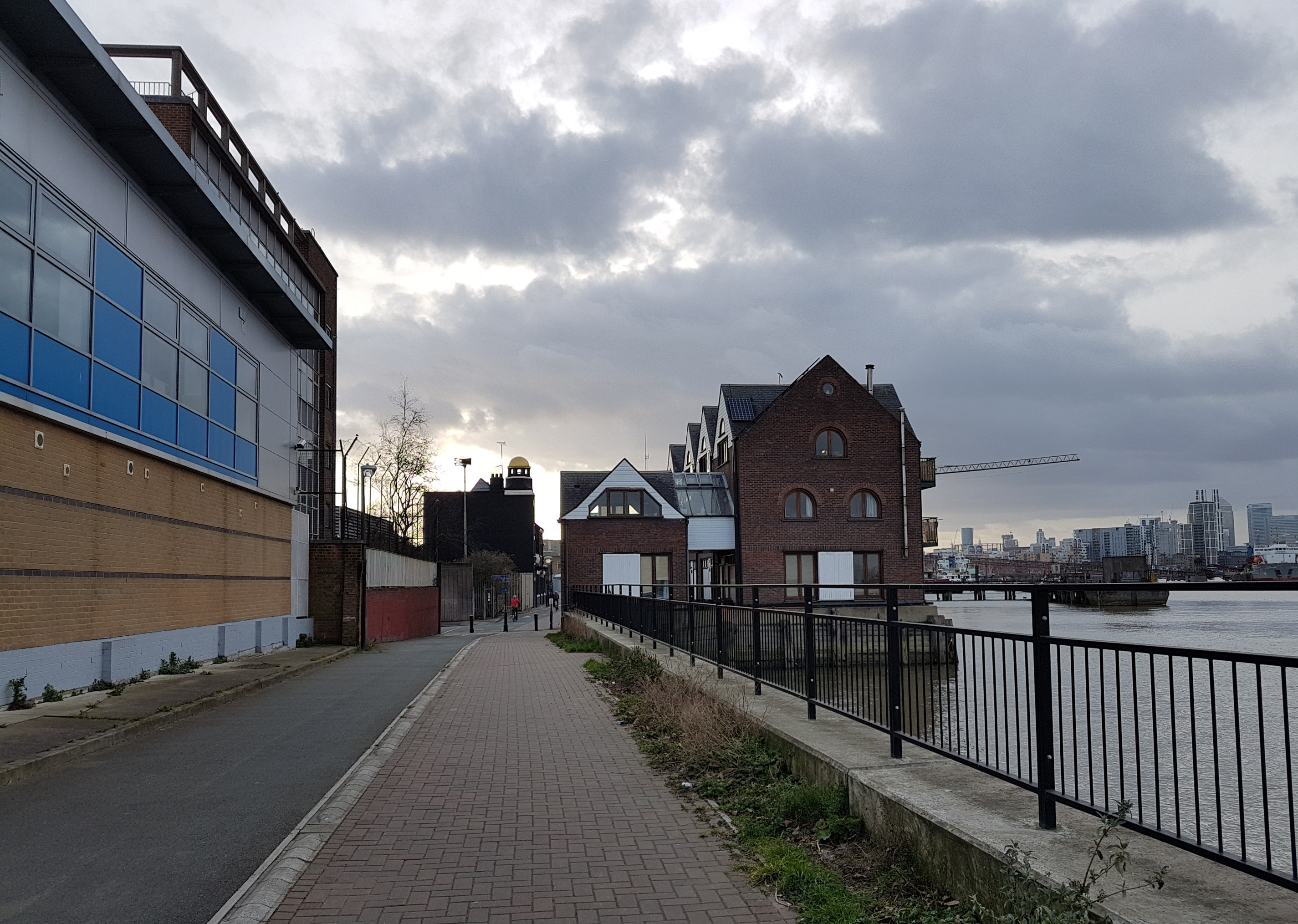
Thames Path near the Anchor & Hope

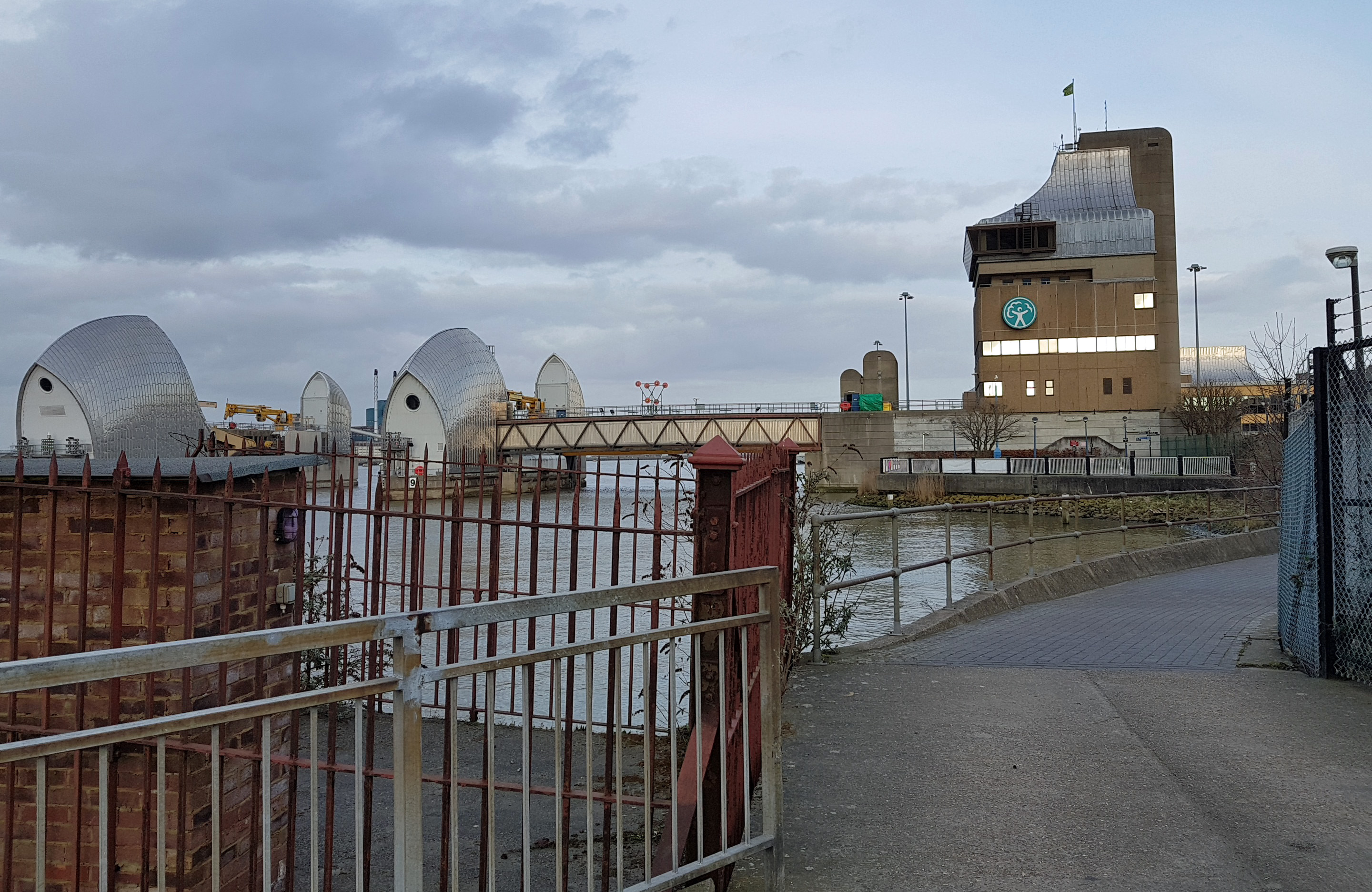
Thames Path near Thames Barrier

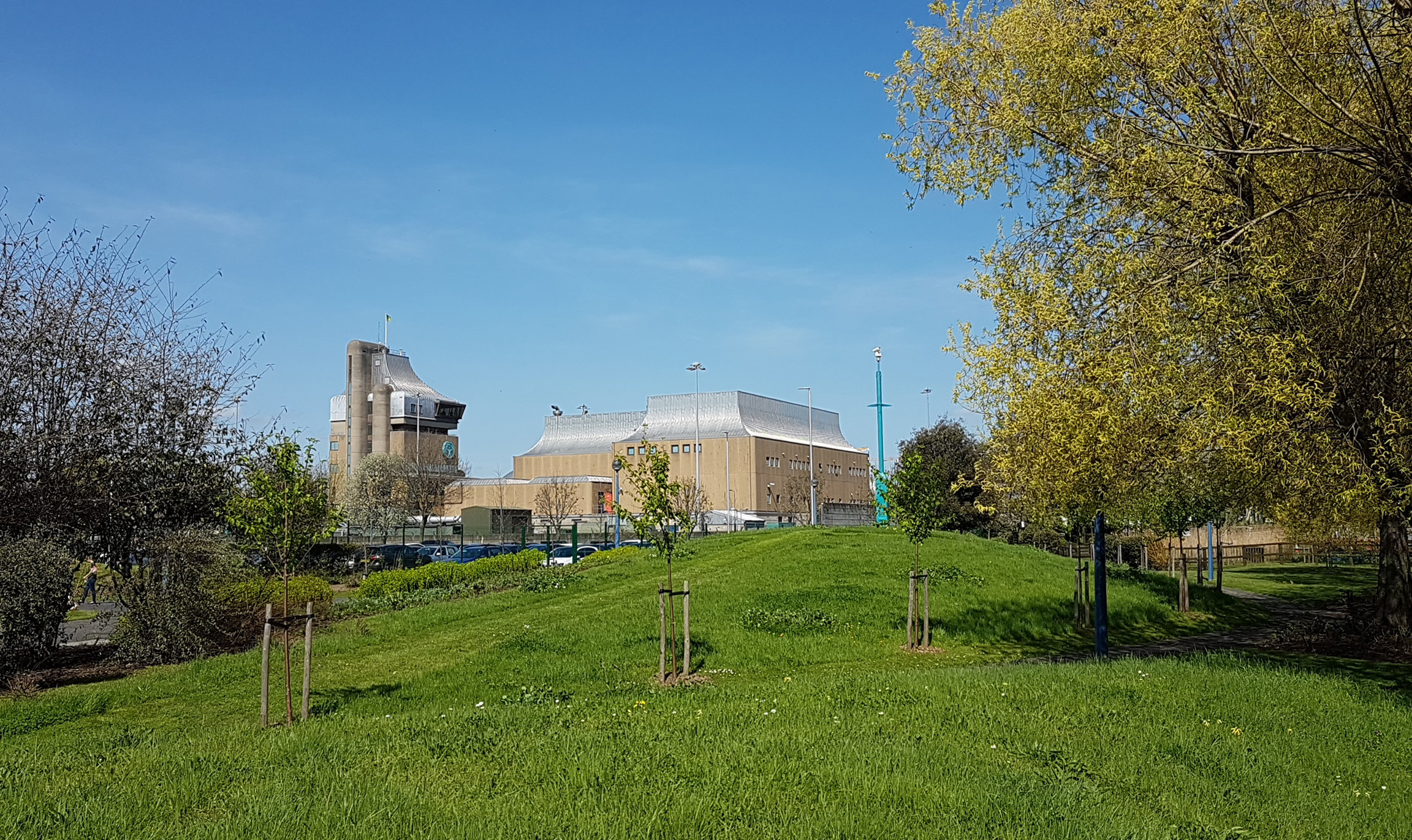
Thames Barrier park and administrative buildings

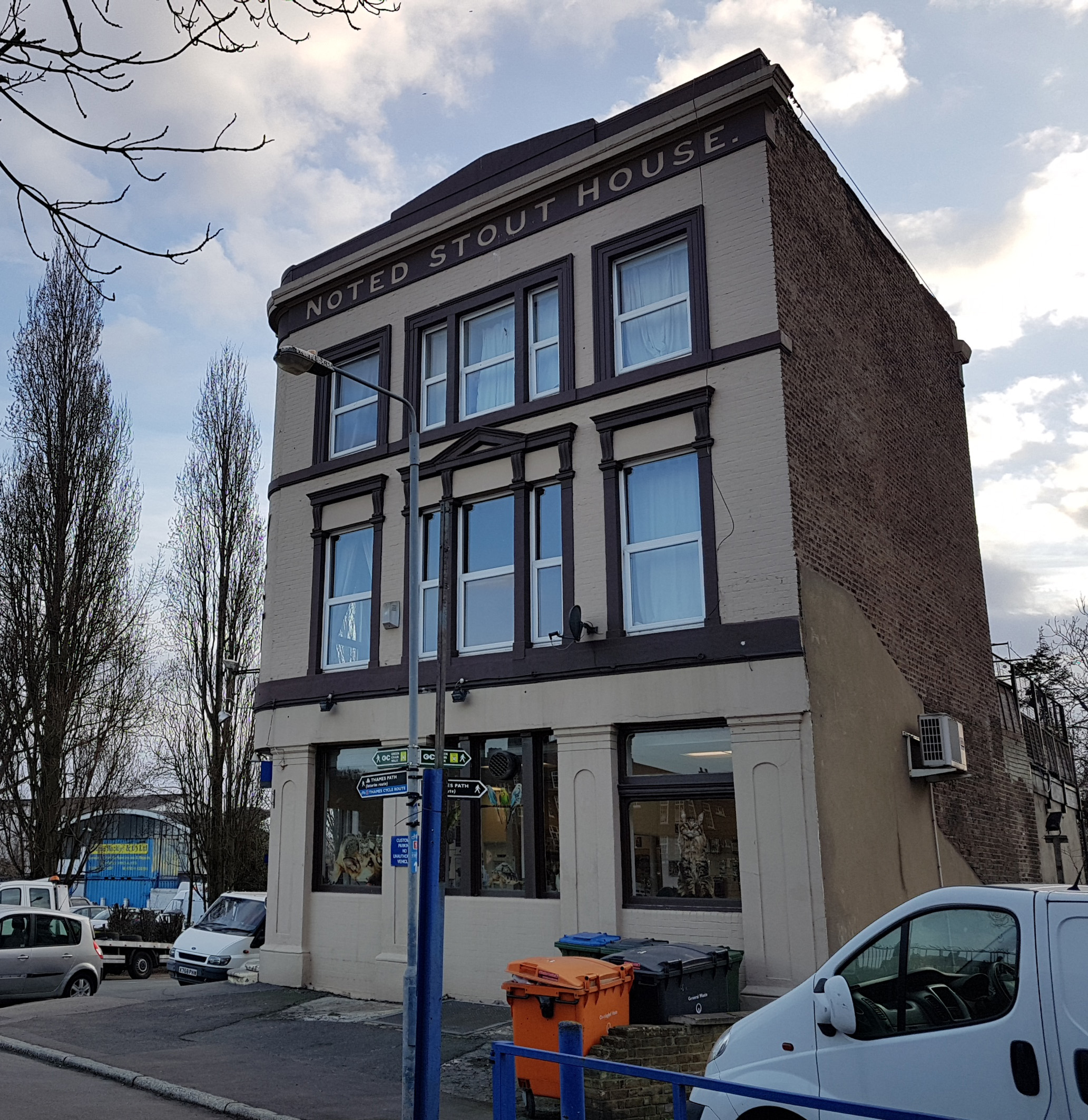
Former Thames Barrier Arms public house
