= Thames Barrier =

Flood defence system for London, England

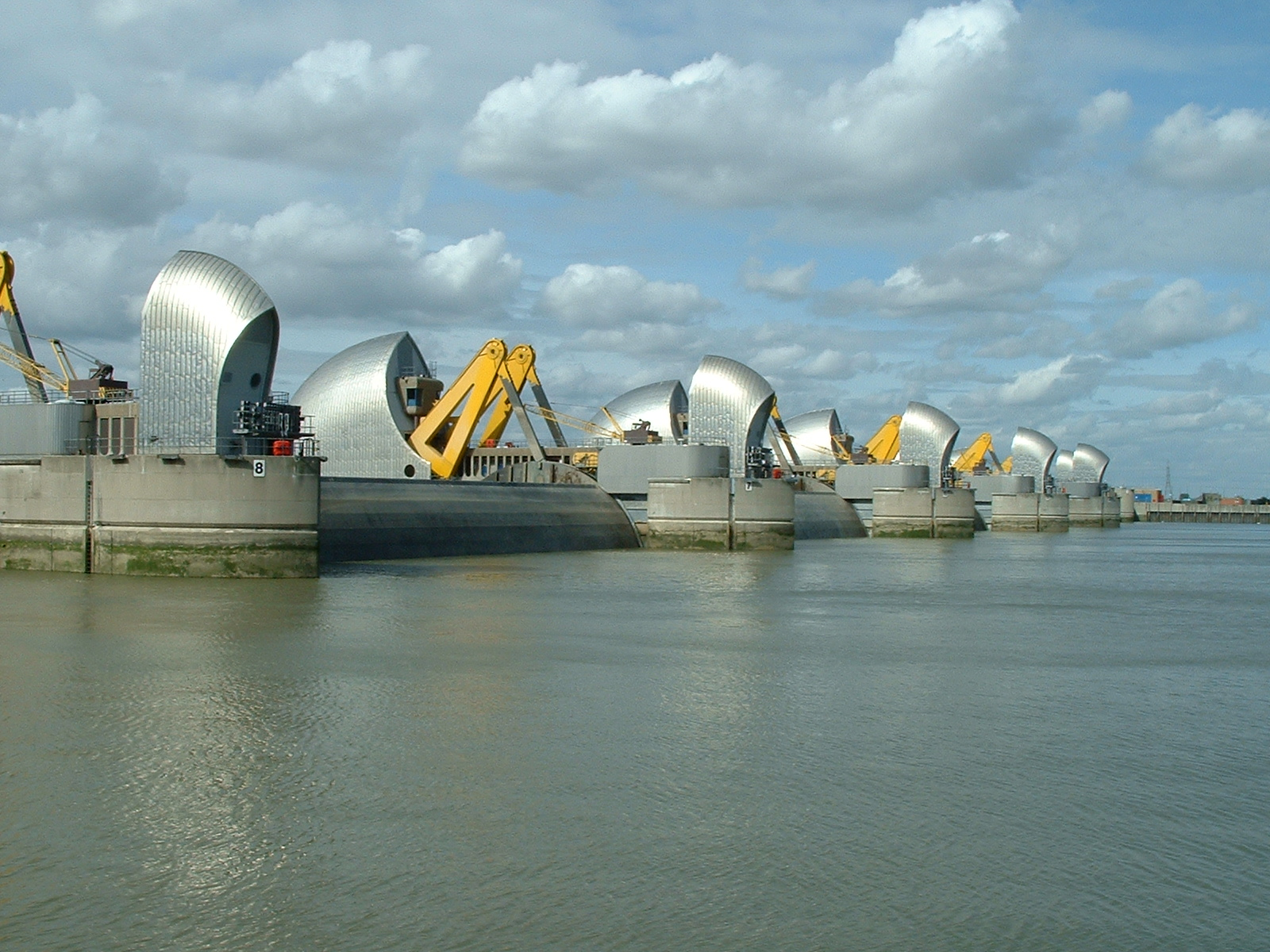
- View of the barrier gates, which are closed when a high tide is forecast
- Interactive map of Thames Barrier
- Country: United Kingdom
- Location: London
- Coordinates: 51°29′49″N 0°2′12″E
- Purpose: Flood control
- Status: Operational
- Construction began: 1974; 52 years ago
- Opening date: 8 May 1984; 42 years ago
- Construction cost: £535 million
- Built by: Costain; Hollandsche Beton Maatschappij; Tarmac Construction; Tysons, Liverpool; Cleveland Bridge & Engineering
- Operator: Environment Agency

Dam and spillways
- Type of dam: Barrage
- Impounds: River Thames
- Height (thalweg): 20.1 metres
- Length: 520 metres

Power Station
- Turbines: 0
- Website; GOV.UK page

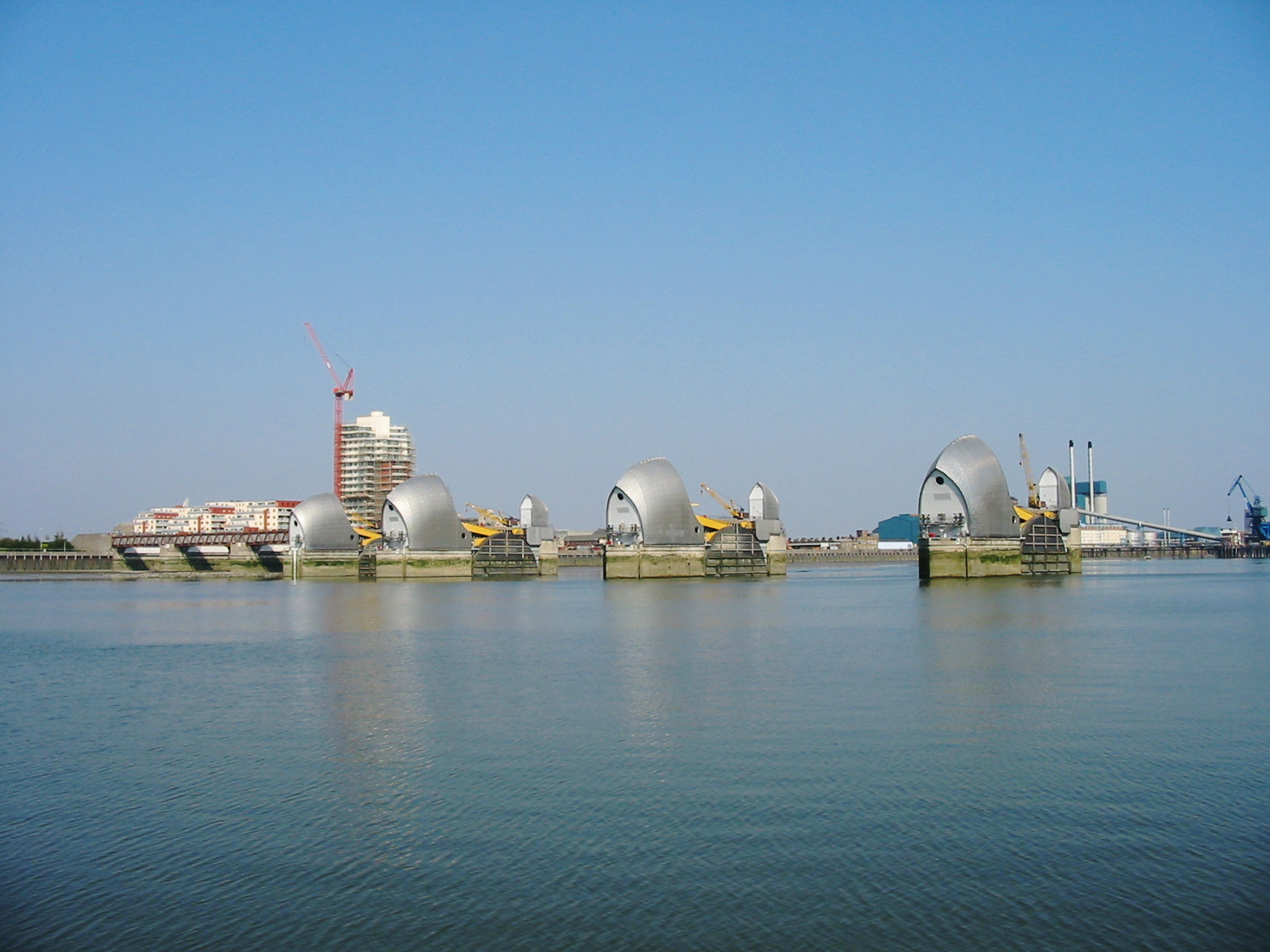
Far view of the River Thames Flood Barrier

The Thames Barrier is a retractable barrier system built to protect the floodplain of most of Greater London from exceptionally high tides and storm surges moving up from the North Sea. It has been operational since 1982. When needed, it is closed (raised) during high tide; at low tide, it can be opened to restore the river's flow towards the sea. Built about 2 miles (3.2 kilometres) east of the Isle of Dogs, its northern bank is in Silvertown in the London Borough of Newham and its southern bank is in the New Charlton area of the Royal Borough of Greenwich.

== History ==
=== Background ===
Flooding in London has been a problem since Roman times. In 1954, the Waverley Committee, established to investigate the serious North Sea flood of 1953 which affected parts of the Thames Estuary and parts of London, recommended that "as an alternative to raising the banks, the possibility and cost of erecting a structure across the Thames which could be closed in a surge should be urgently investigated". A number of designs were put forward, from a huge road viaduct with two 500 foot (150 m) sluice gates crossing the Thames at Crayfordness to flap gates lying on the river bed and floated up by compressed air. By 1965, when the Greater London Council (GLC) took over responsibility, two major schemes were under consideration, costed at £24 million and £41 million respectively (£500 million and £800 million at 2020 prices).

In 1966, Sir Hermann Bondi was asked to take an independent view of the situation. He considered the estimated construction costs and the probability of a flood and of damage if the barrier was not built. He strongly recommended that a barrier should be built in order to avoid the catastrophe of flooding central London, and a site was agreed at Woolwich.

The barrier protects central London against a storm surge, caused when a deep depression forms to the north of Scotland and progresses across the North Sea and south-easterly towards southern Scandinavia. When such a surge coincides with a high spring tide, the high winds associated with the depression can funnel the water up the Thames Estuary and cause surges of up to 3.5 metres (11.6 feet). The planners assessed that in the absence of a barrier, such a surge could inundate 45 square miles (117 km^{2}) of land, put hospitals, power stations and the London Underground out of action and cause damage estimated in 1966 at £2 billion (about £50 billion at 2020 prices). The barrier was designed to provide a flood defence capable of resisting a once in 1000 year surge tide at a base date of 2030.

=== Design and construction ===
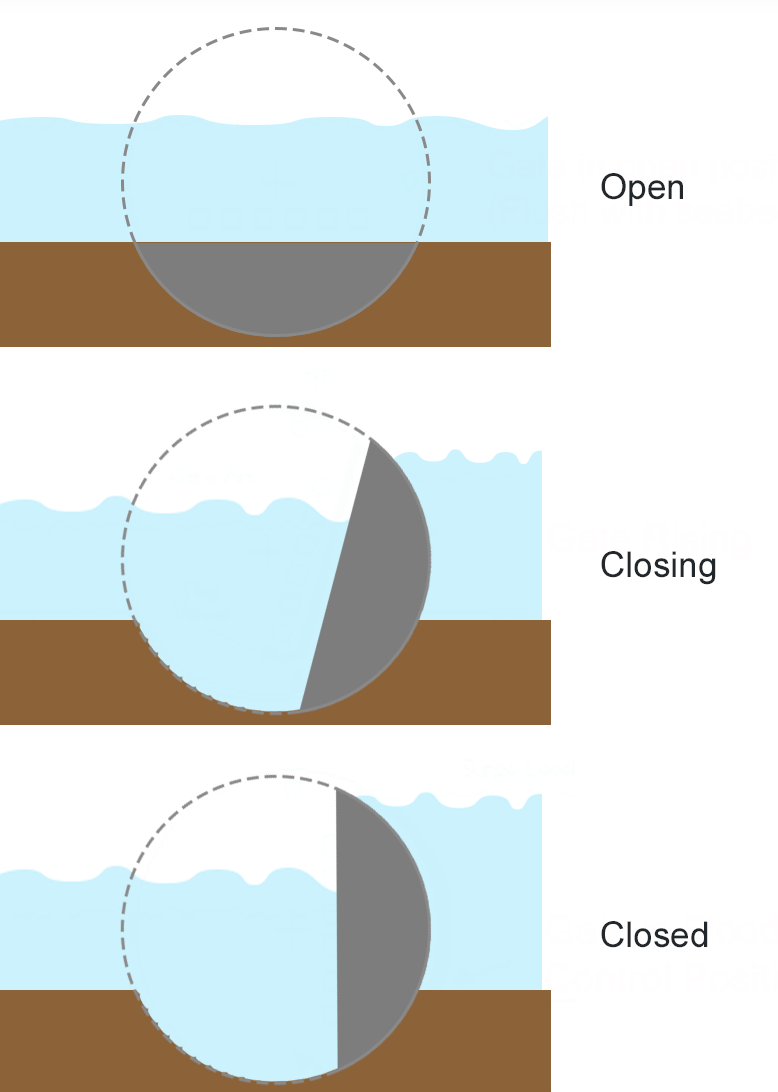
Diagram showing how the gates work, though the barrier actually rises further than this to allow water to "underspill" under the barrier in a controlled fashion

The concept of the rising sector gates was devised by (Reginald) Charles Draper. In 1969, from his parents' house in Pellatt Grove, Wood Green, London, he constructed a working model. The novel rotating cylinders were based on the design of the taps on his gas cooker. The barrier was designed by Rendel, Palmer and Tritton for the Greater London Council and the concept tested at the Hydraulics Research Station, Wallingford. The site at New Charlton was chosen because of the relative straightness of the banks, and because the underlying river chalk was strong enough to support the barrier.

The Thames Barrier and Flood Prevention Act, authorising construction, was passed in 1972. In 1974, the GLC placed the two major construction contracts. Civil construction was undertaken by a Costain/Hollandsche Beton Maatschappij/Tarmac Construction consortium. A separate contract for the gates and operating machinery was placed with the Davy Cleveland Barrier Consortium, formed by Davy McKee Ltd of Sheffield and Cleveland Bridge UK Ltd.

Work began at the barrier site in 1974 and progressed in two phases. The southern piers (9 to 6) were built first, with river traffic diverted to the north side, then traffic routed through the completed southern spans whilst the north side piers (1 to 5) were built. During construction of the piers, precast concrete sills were built in a cofferdam on the north side of the river and floated out and sunk between the piers to form the gate recesses, with access tunnels at the upstream and downstream ends.

The gates of the barrier were fabricated in sections at Cleveland Bridge's Darlington works and assembled at Port Clarence on the River Tees. The gates, gate arms and rocking beams were transported from the Tees to the Thames by barge and lifted into position by two very large floating cranes operated by Neptun of Hamburg (now part of Smit International). The mechanical and hydraulic machinery was built by Davy Loewy, Henry Berry and Vickers and trial assembled in Davy's Darnall works. Delays to the civil works required changes to the construction and installation sequence, but commissioning was relatively uneventful and the first trial operation of all the gates together was carried out on 31 October 1982.

In addition to the barrier, the flood defences 18 kilometres (11 mi) down river were raised and strengthened. The barrier was officially opened on 8 May 1984 by Queen Elizabeth II. The barrier cost £461 million (£1.55 billion now). Total construction cost was around £535 million (£2.4 billion at 2024 prices) with an additional £100 million for river defences.

Built across a 520-metre (1,710 ft) wide stretch of the river, the barrier divides the river into four 61-metre (200 ft) and two approximately 30-metre (100 ft) navigable spans. There are also four smaller non-navigable channels between nine concrete piers and two abutments. The flood gates across the openings are circular segments in cross section, and they operate by rotating, raised to allow "underspill" to allow operators to control upstream levels and a complete 180 degree rotation for maintenance. All the gates are hollow and made of steel up to 40 millimetres (1.6 in) thick. The gates are filled with water when submerged and empty as they emerge from the river. The four large central gates are 20.1 metres (66 ft) high and weigh 3,700 tonnes each. Four radial gates by the river banks, also about 30 metres (100 ft) wide, can be lowered. These gate openings, unlike the main six, are non-navigable.

=== Predictions for operation ===
A Thames Barrier flood defence closure is triggered when a combination of high tides forecast in the North Sea and high river flows at the tidal limit at Teddington Lock indicate that water levels would exceed 16 feet (4.9 m) in central London. Though Teddington marks the Normal Tidal Limit, in periods of very high fluvial flow the tidal influence can be seen as far upstream as East Molesey on the Thames.

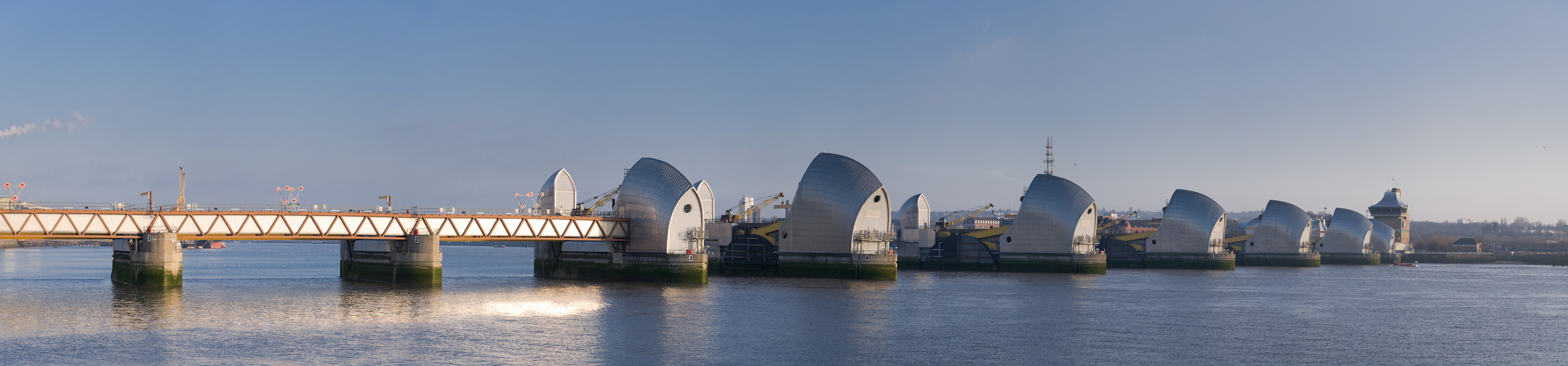
The barrier from Silvertown on the north bank of the river during normal operation, looking across to New Charlton

=== Barrier closures and incidents ===
Closures per season (Sept–May) and flooding source
Season	Tidal	Combined tidal/ fluvial	Total
1982–83	1	0	1
1983–84	0	0	0
1984–85	0	0	0
1985–86	0	1	1
1986–87	1	0	1
1987–88	0	0	0
1988–89	1	0	1
1989–90	1	3	4
1990–91	2	0	2
1991–92	0	0	0
1992–93	4	0	4
1993–94	3	4	7
1994–95	2	2	4
1995–96	4	0	4
1996–97	1	0	1
1997–98	1	0	1
1998–99	2	0	2
1999–00	3	3	6
2000–01	16	8	24
2001–02	3	1	4
2002–03	8	12	20
2003–04	1	0	1
2004–05	4	0	4
2005–06	3	0	3
2006–07	8	0	8
2007–08	6	0	6
2008–09	1	4	5
2009–10	2	3	5
2010–11	0	0	0
2011–12	0	0	0
2012–13	0	5	5
2013–14	9	41	50
2014–15	1	0	1
2015–16	1	0	1
2016–17	2	0	2
2017–18	3	0	3
2018–19	3	0	3
2019–20	9	0	9
2020–21	2	4	6
2021–22	7	0	7
2022–23	2	0	2
2023–24	2	11	13
2024–25	0	0	0
2025–26	0	0	0
2026-27	0	0	0
Totals	119	102	221

As of July 2026, there have been 221 flood defence closures. The barrier was closed twice on 9 November 2007 after a storm surge in the North Sea which was compared to the one in 1953. The main danger of flooding from the surge was on the coast above the Thames Barrier, where evacuations took place, but the winds abated a little and, at the Thames Barrier, the 9 November 2007 storm surge did not completely coincide with high tide.

On 20 August 1989, hours after the Marchioness disaster, the barrier was closed against a spring tide for 16 hours "to assist the diving and salvage operations".

The barrier has survived 15 boat collisions without serious damage.

On 27 October 1997, the barrier was damaged when the dredger MV Sand Kite hit one of the piers in thick fog. As the ship started to sink she dumped her 3,300-tonne load of aggregate, finally sinking by the bow on top of one of the barrier's gates, where she lay for several days. Initially the gate could not be closed as it was covered in a thick layer of gravel. A longer-term problem was the premature loss of paint on the flat side of the gate caused by abrasion. The vessel was refloated in mid-November 1997.

The annual full test closure in 2012 was scheduled for 3 June to coincide with the Thames pageant celebrating the Diamond Jubilee of Elizabeth II. Environment Agency said the pageant provided "a unique opportunity to test its design for a longer period than we would normally be able to", and performance under conditions of "a higher water level upstream than downstream"; also that the "more stable tidal conditions … in central London … will help the vessels taking part".

=== Ownership and operating authority ===
The barrier was originally commissioned by the Greater London Council under the guidance of Ray Horner. After the 1986 abolition of the GLC it was operated successively by Thames Water Authority (dissolved 1989) and then the National Rivers Authority until April 1996 when it passed to the Environment Agency.

=== Operations ===
The barrier was originally designed to protect London against a very high flood level (with an estimated return period of one hundred years) up to the year 2030, after which the protection would decrease, while remaining within acceptable limits. At the time of its construction, the barrier was expected to be used 2–3 times per year. By the mid-2000s it was being operated 6–7 times a year. In the 2010s, the barrier was generally (as a median) closed twice a year, but the average remained 6–7 due to the extreme of 50 closures in 2013–14 during the wettest winter in recorded history.

This defence level allowed for long-term changes in sea and land levels as understood at that time (c. 1970). From 1982 until 19 March 2007, the barrier was raised one hundred times to prevent flooding. It is also raised monthly for testing, with a full test closure over high tide once a year.

=== Past proposals for development ===
Released in 2005, a study by four academics contained a proposal to supersede the Thames Barrier with a more ambitious 16 km (10 mi) long barrier across the Thames Estuary from Sheerness in Kent to Southend-on-Sea in Essex.

In November 2011, a new Thames Barrier, further downstream at Lower Hope between East Tilbury in Essex and Cliffe in Kent, was proposed as part of the Thames Hub integrated infrastructure vision. The barrier would incorporate turbines to generate renewable energy and include road and rail tunnels, providing connections from Essex to a major new Thames Estuary Airport on the Isle of Grain.

In 2019 architects Lifschutz Davidson Sandilands and marine engineers Beckett Rankine launched a proposal for a pedestrian and cycle bridge located next to the Thames Barrier; the scheme, called the Thames Barrier Bridge, was promoted as the only location in east London where a low-level opening bridge across the Thames could have relatively moderate opening spans of about 60 m (200 ft).

== Future ==
=== 2012 debate on changing climatic conditions ===
In a January 2013 letter to The Times, a former member of the Thames Barrier Project Management Team, Dr Richard Bloore, stated that it was not designed with increased storminess and sea level rises in mind, and called for a new barrier to be looked into immediately.

The Environment Agency responded that it did not plan to replace the Thames Barrier before 2070, as it was designed with an allowance for sea level rise of 8 mm (0.31 in) per year, which has not happened in the intervening years. At the time, the barrier was around halfway through its designed lifespan. The standard of protection it provides will gradually decline over time after 2030, from a 1-in-1000-year event. The Environment Agency was examining the Thames Barrier for its potential design life under climate change, with early indications being that subject to appropriate modification, the Thames Barrier would be capable of providing continued protection to London against rising sea levels.

=== 2023 review - decision by 2040 ===
A UK Environment Agency review in 2023 said that new climate models showed heightened risk of flooding, implying a need for raised defences upstream of the Thames Barrier by 2050, but that the Thames Barrier was expected to continue to operate until 2070. A decision on the best option for adapting to sea level rise to 2100 will be taken by 2040.

== Gallery ==
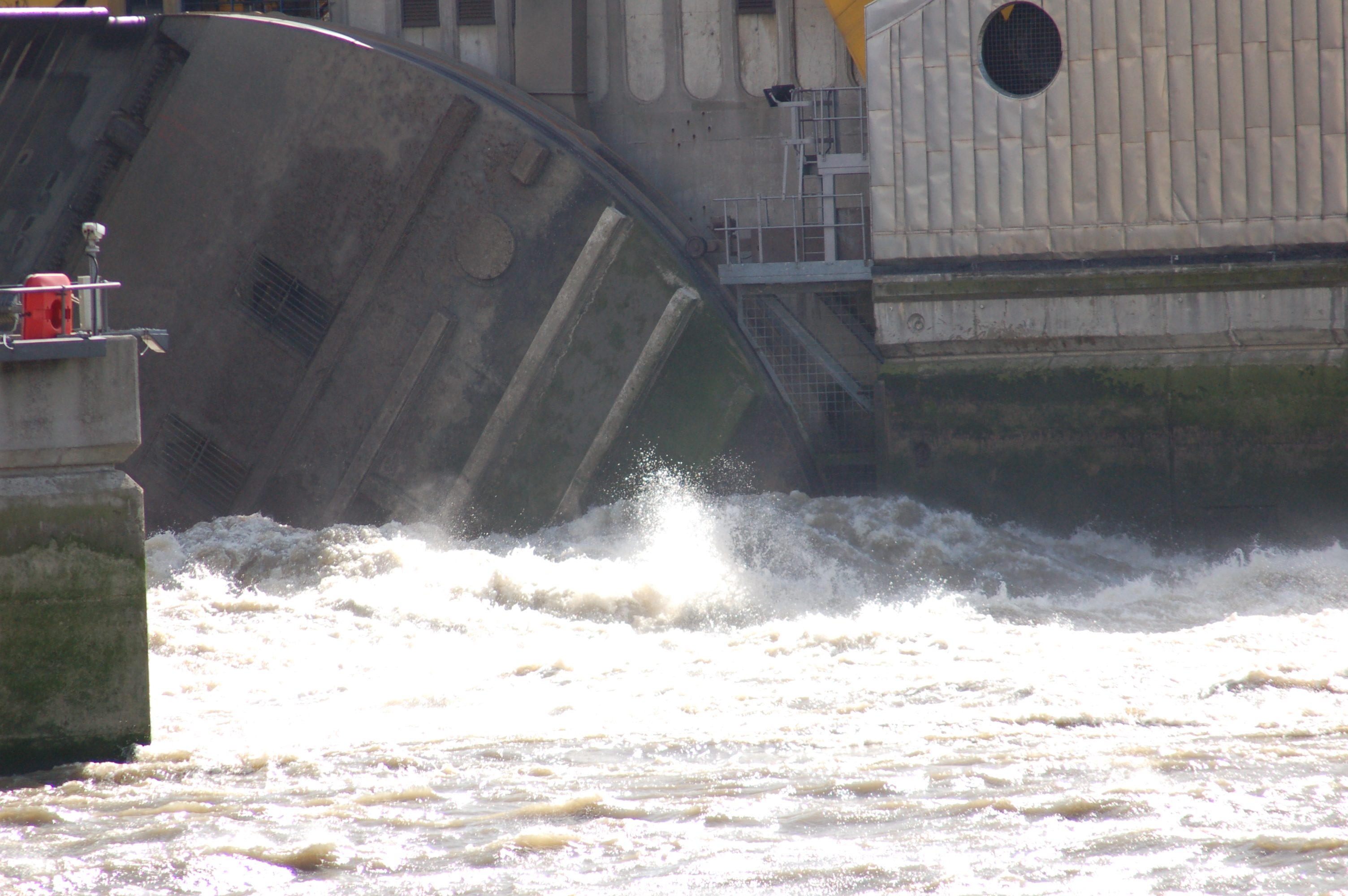
One of the gates in underspill

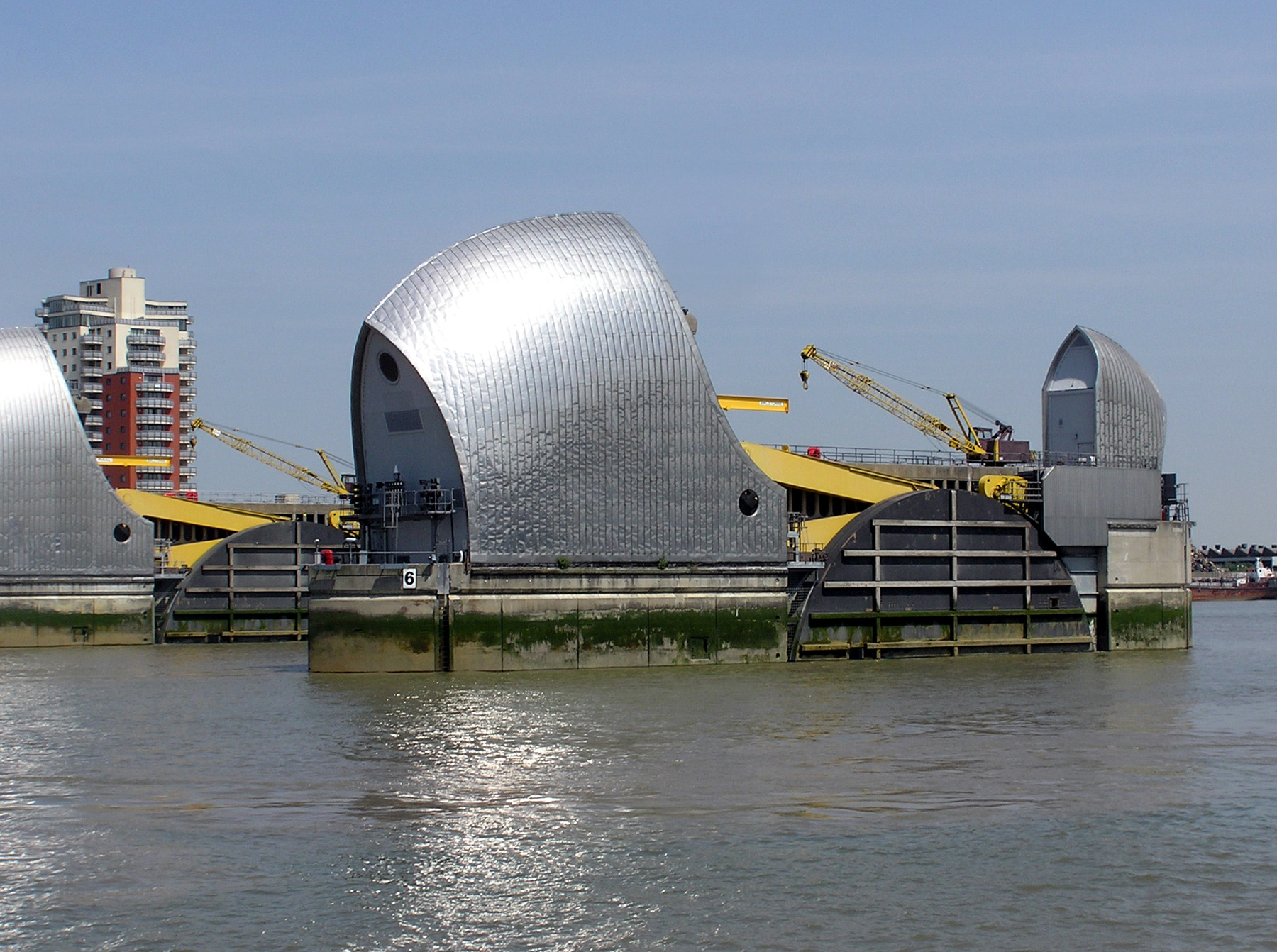
Thames Barrier Pier 6

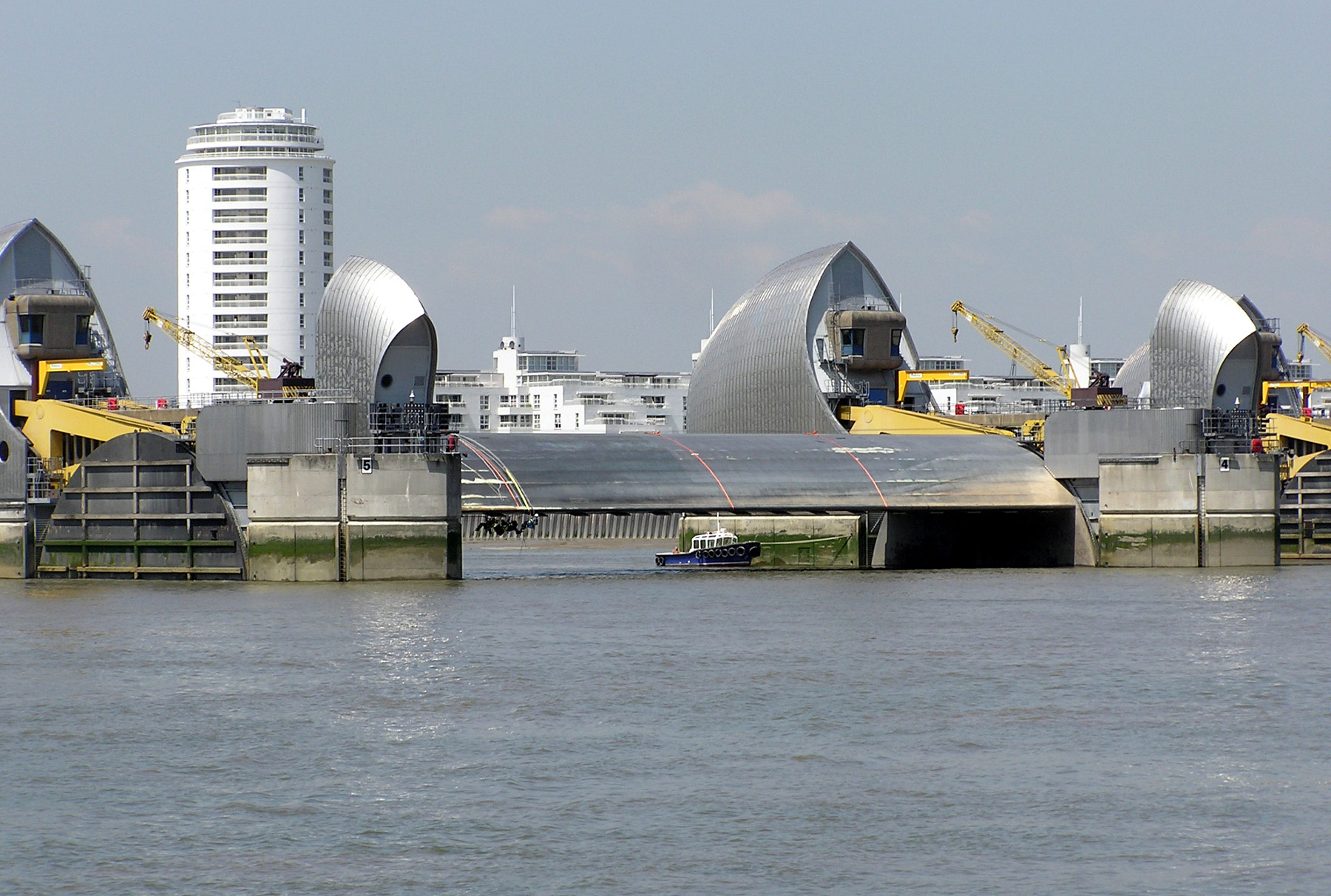
Gate in maintenance

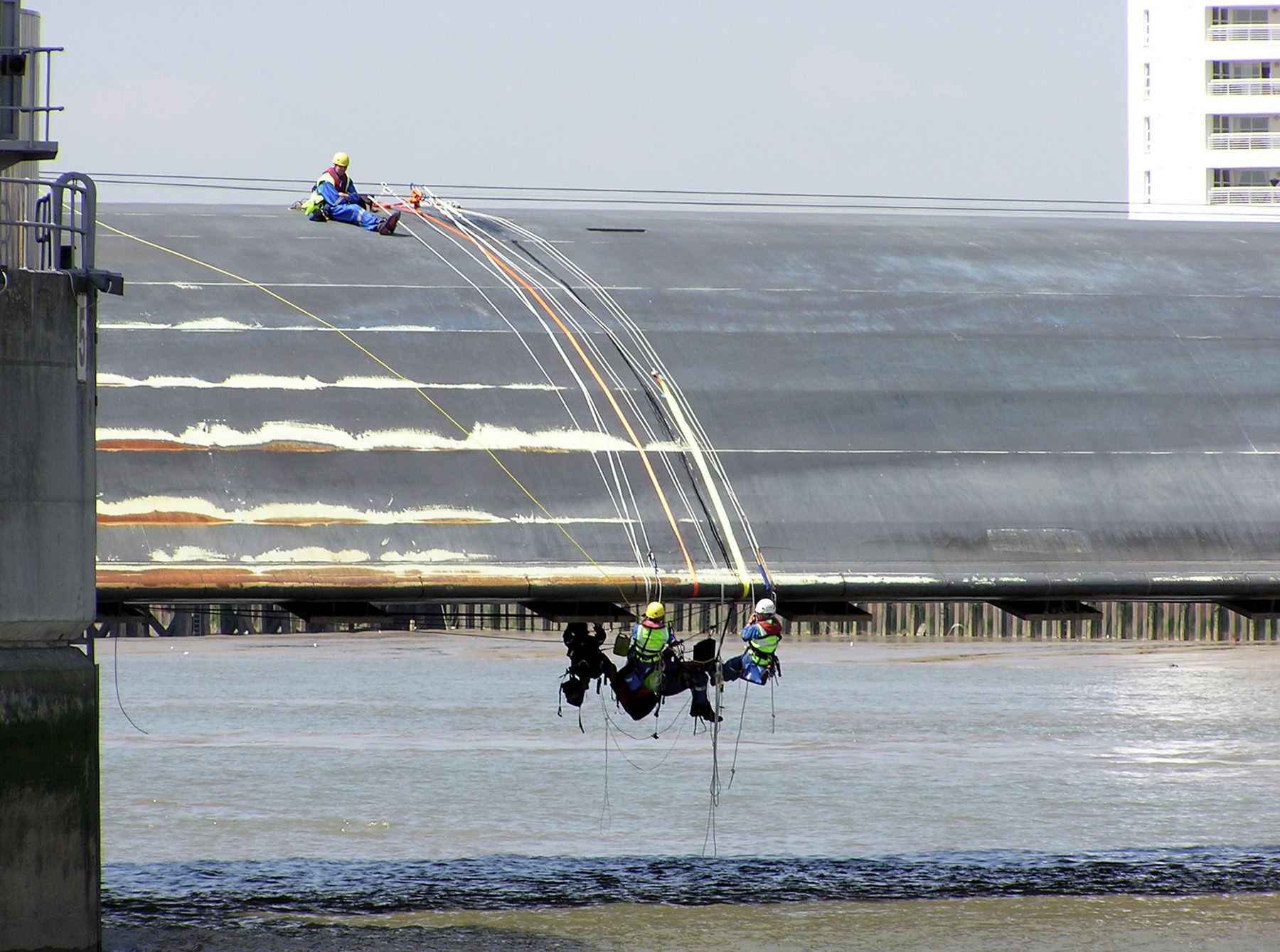
Maintenance closeup

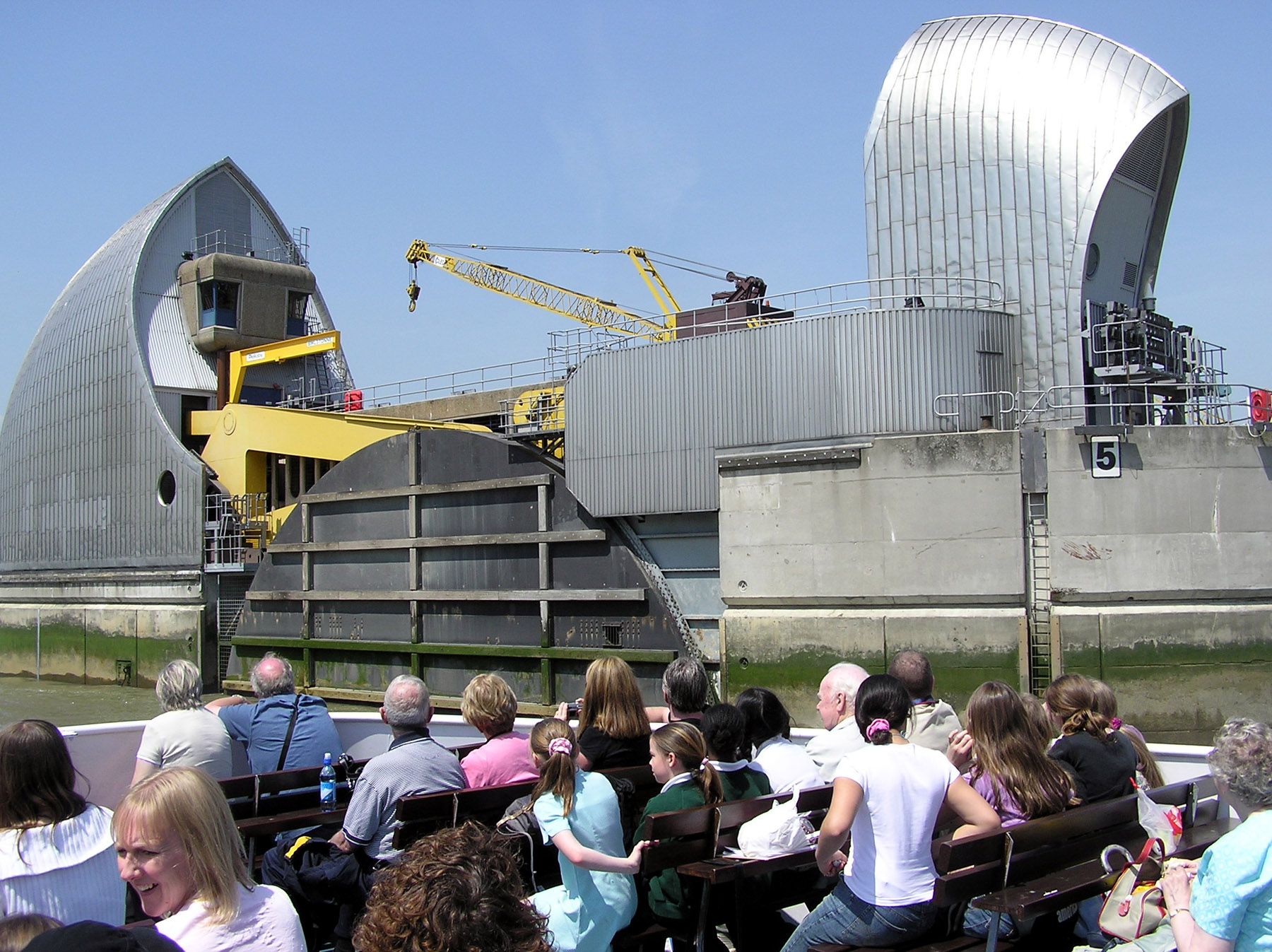
Pier closeup

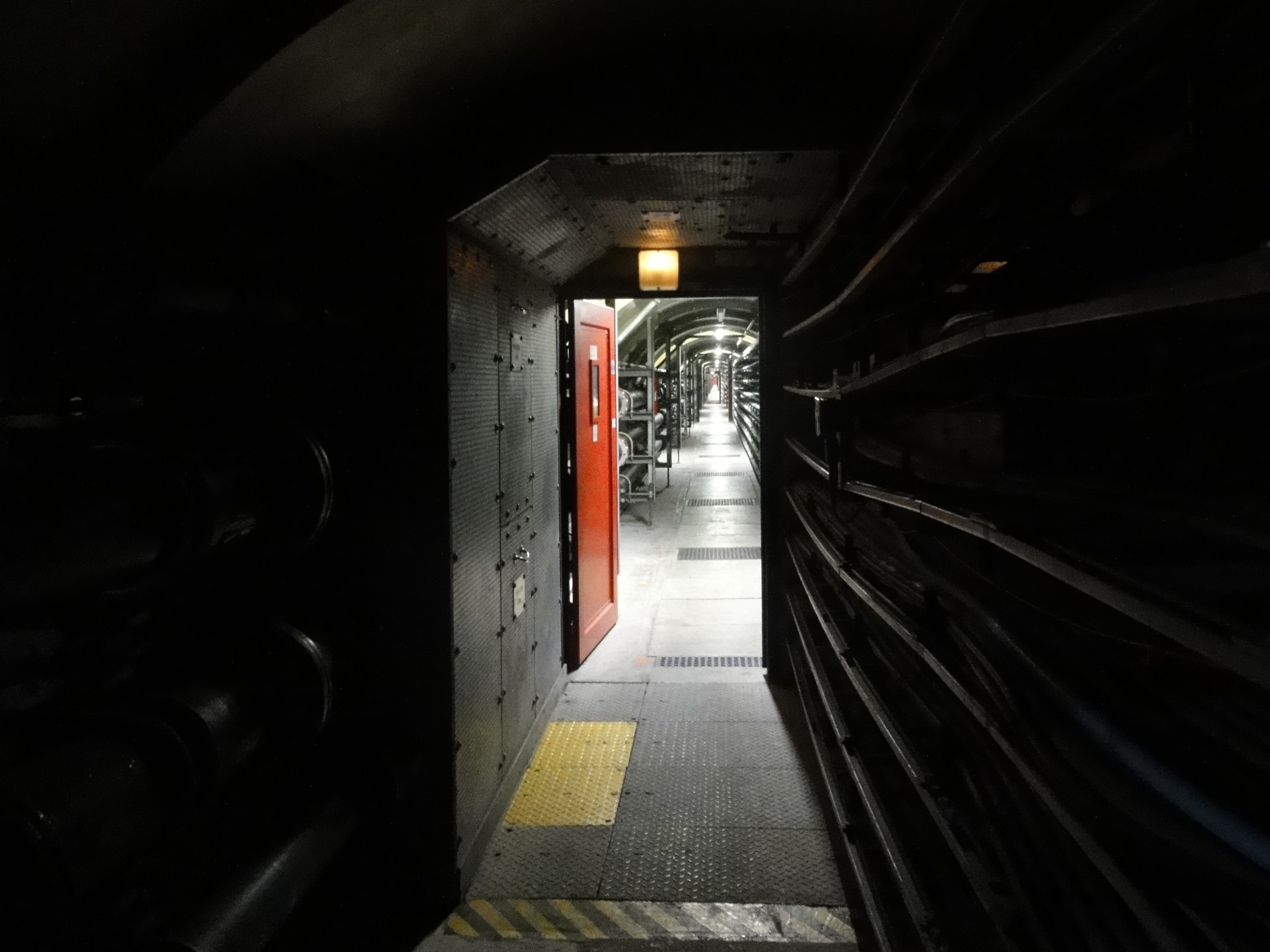
Tunnel underneath the Thames Barrier between piers

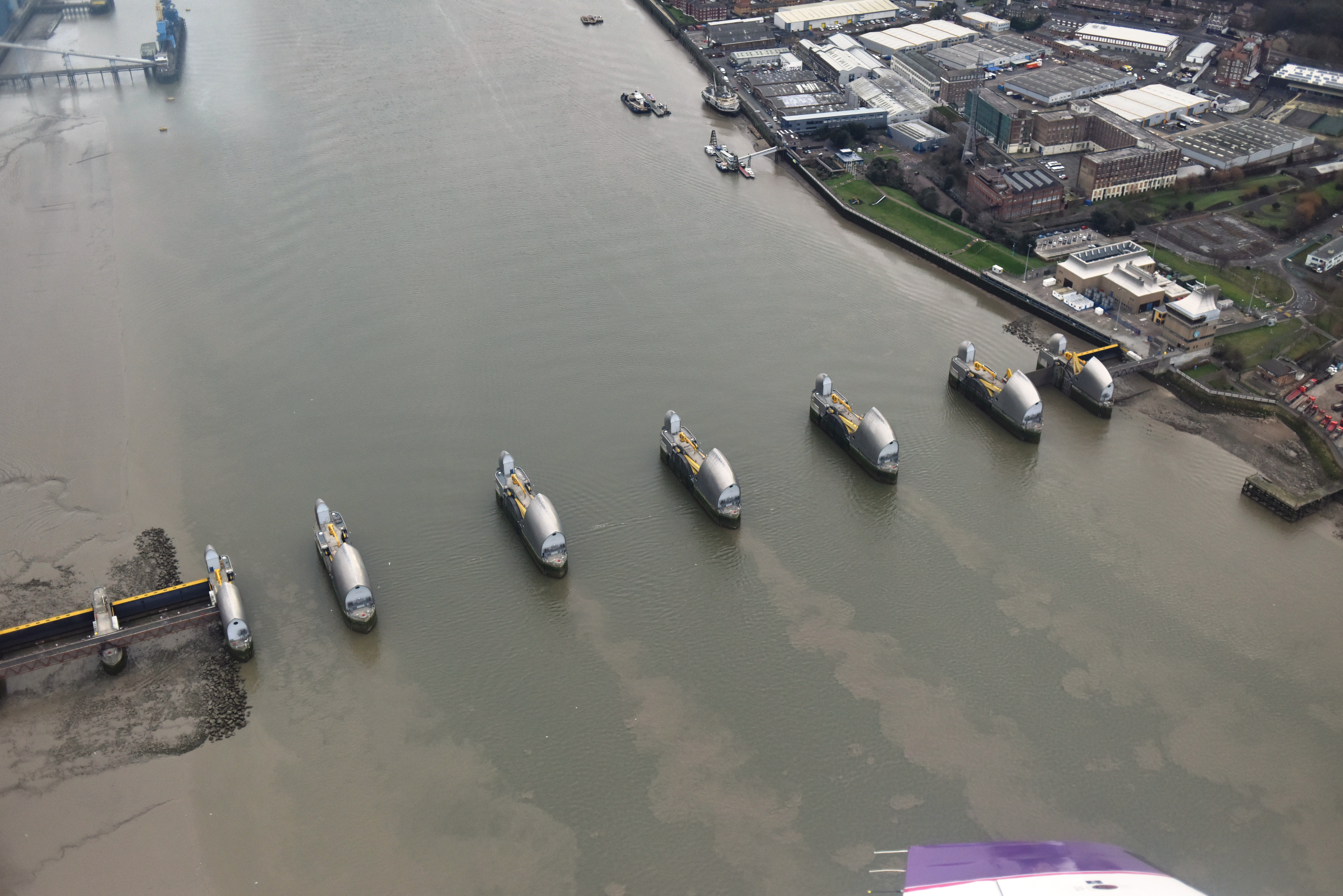
Aerial view of the barrier (lowered)

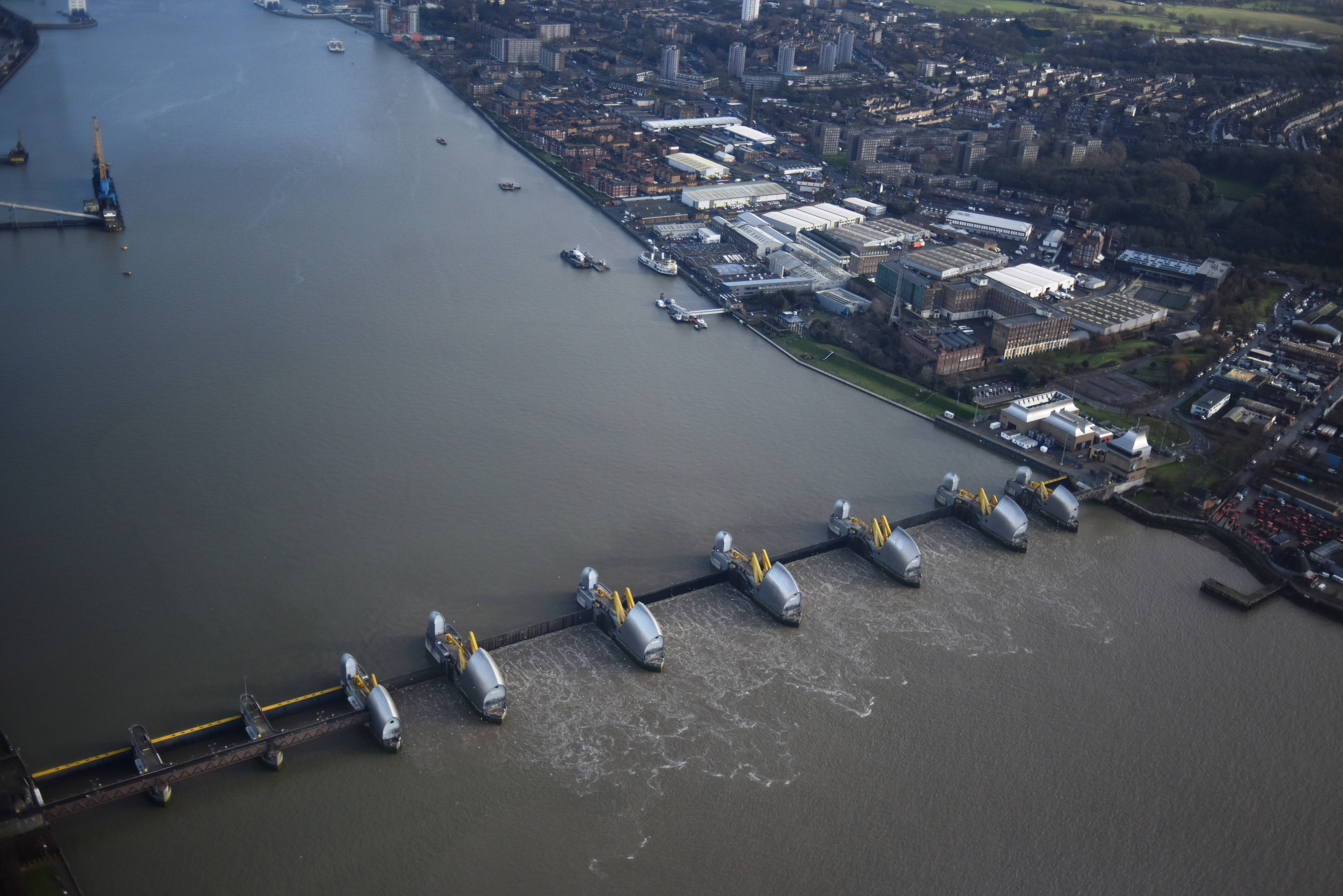
Aerial view of the barrier (raised)

== See also ==
- Barrier Gardens Pier
- Crossings of the River Thames
- Delta Works with the Oosterscheldekering
- Floodgate
- MOSE Project
- Saint Petersburg Dam Flood Prevention Facility Complex
- Thames Barrier Park
