= List of windmills in London =

Extant windmills (red), former windmills (blue) and extant tide mills (green) in Greater London.
1 Arkley, 2 Barking, 3 Battersea, 4 Brixton, 5 Keston, 6 Plumstead Common, 7 Shirley, 8 Twickenham, 9 Upminster, 10 Wandsworth Common, 11 Wimbledon Common, 12 West Ham.

A list of existing and former windmills whose sites fall within Greater London, England. When built, these mills were within the counties of Kent, Surrey, Middlesex, Hertfordshire or Essex. Of those windmills known to have existed, nine remain and are preserved; as are the tide mills at Three Mills, West Ham.

== Locations ==
=== A - B ===
Location	Name of mill and grid reference	Type	Maps	First mention or built	Last mention or demise	Photograph
Acton	TQ 208 803		1742	1622	1742	
Acton	TQ 208 803	Smock		1801	1859, gone by 1865	painting by John Varley, 1835
Acton	TQ 195 805			18th century	18th century	
Addington		Post	1610^{*} 1626; 1659; 1700^{*} 1733	1292	1773	
Arkley	Barnet Gate Mill; TQ 218 953	Tower		c. 1830	Windmill World	
Ashford				1277	1309	
Barking	TQ 458 842	Post		1243	1243	
Barking	TQ 439 839		1777	1738	1793	
Barking	Wellington Mill; TQ 436 839	Smock		1815	Demolished 1926	
Barnes	Mill Hill Mill	Post	1673; 1729; 1733; 1753	1443	Blown down 15 October 1780	
Barnes	Mill Lodge Mill	Smock		1783	Demolished c. 1836	
Battersea	Colour Mill			1645	1645	
Battersea	Corn mill			1645	1645	
Battersea	Lead Mill			1645	1645	
Battersea	Nine Elms Mill	Post	1753; 1777^{*}	1753	Standing in 1814, not on 1823 map, gone by 1828	
Battersea	Red House Mill	Smock	1753; 1777^{*}	1753	1851	
Battersea	Randall's Mill	Tower	1762	1762	1836	
Battersea	Fowler's Mill; TQ 269 770	Horizontal	1790; 1823	1788	Dismantled c. 1825	
Bermondsey	Cherry Garden Pier Mill					
Bermondsey	Abbey Mill #1	Post		1805	1812	
Bermondsey	Abbey Mill #2					
Bermondsey	Poupart's Mill, Blue Anchor Mill	Post	1753; 1820; 1823	1753	Burnt down, 12 January 1866	
Bermondsey		Tower		1834	1844, probably demolished in the 1850s	
Bexley		Horizontal		1842	Advertised for sale in 1842, no other details known.	
Blackfriars	Approximately; TQ 324 808			1696	1748	
Blackheath	Lewisham Hill Mill		1695^{*} 1745	1695	1745	
Blackheath	Morden Hill Mill		1745	1745	1750	
Blackheath	Black Heath	Post	1769	1769	1819	
Blackheath	Black Heath	Post	1769	1769	1769	
Bow	Old Ford; TQ 365 835	Post	1844	1823	1852	
Bow	TQ 375 832	Smock	1844	1823	1852	
Brentford	approximately TQ 172 786			1670	1703	
Brentford	TQ 186 779	Smock		1777	1828	
Brixton	Ashby's Mill; TQ 303 737	Tower	1816; 1823	1816		
Brixton	Brixton Hill Mill	Smock	1816; 1823	1803	1845	
Bromley		Post	1763; 1769; 1843	1665	Demolished January 1835.	
Bromley by Bow	Metcalfe's Mill; Approximately; TQ 379 825		1754	1754	1754	

=== C - D ===
Location	Name of mill and grid reference	Type	Maps	First mention or built	Last mention or demise	Photograph
Camberwell	Camberwell Mill; Freeman's Mill	Post	1753	1709	1831	
Camberwell	Dovedale Manor mill	Smock or Tower	1823; 1850	1823	1850	
Camberwell	Frensham Street Mill		1820; 1850	1820	1850	
Camberwell	Bree Kill Mill	Post	1746^{*} 1789	1746	Demolition ordered 1815	
Camerwell		Post		1307	1307	
Charlton				1660	Burnt down, 1660	
Chelsea	Tothill Fields	Smock		1799	1815	
Chelsea	Tothill Fields	Post		1806	1806	
Chelsea	Thames Bank Mill; TQ 287 780	Smock		1832	c. 1870	
Chelsea	Don Salter's Walk	Smock		c. 1870	c. 1870	
Chelsea	Waterworks	Smock		1752	1762	
Chelsfield	Well Hill Mill		1769	1769	1769	
Chislehurst	Chislehurst Common Mill	Smock		1796	Demolished c.1877	
Chiswick	TQ 211 786	Post	1675	1675	1765	
Chiswick	Approximately; TQ 224 784	Post	1675	1675	1675	
City of London	Mountmill, Cripplegate			1598	Blown down 1601	
City of London	Queenhithe, Broken Wharf Waterworks	Hollow post	1696; 1724	1696	1748	
City of London	Peerless Pool, Moorfields	Tower		18th century	18th century	
Clapham	Clapham Common Mill		1616	1652	Possibly moved to Nightingale Lane, 1652	
Clapham	Nightingale Lane Mill	Post		1680	1680	
Clerkenwell	Clerkenwell Priory	Sunk post		c. 1100	c. 1100	
Clerkenwell	Commandery Martels; TQ 315 827			14th century	1430	
Clerkenwell	Farncroft; Stowell Mill; TQ 317 825			c. 1358	1399	
Clerkenwell				16th century	16th century	
Clerkenwell	New River Head; TQ 312 827	Tower	1709	1720		
Clerkenwell	Mountmill; TQ 319 826		Early 16th century	Blown down 16th century		
Clerkenwell	Mountmill; TQ 319 826	Post	1563; 1658	1547	1647, gone by c. 1680	
Clerkenwell	Finsbury Fields, East Mill; Approximately; TQ 327 922	Post	1563; 1658; 1660; 1666; 1669	1556	1669	
Clerkenwell	Finsbury Fields, West Mill	Post	1563; 1658; 1660; 1666; 1669	1557	1669	
Clerkenwell	Finsbury Fields, Thomas Wells Mill	Post	1563; 1658; 1660; 1666; 1669	1558	1669	
Clerkenwell	Finsbury Fields, 4th mill	Post		1561	Blown down c. 1600	
Clerkenwell	Finsbury Fields, 5th mill	Post	1658; 1660; 1666; 1669	1617	1669	
Clerkenwell	Finsbury Fields, 6th mill	Post	1658; 1660; 1666; 1669	1617	1669	
Clerkenwell	Finsbury Fields, 7th mill	Post	1658; 1660; 1666	1617	1669	
Coulsdon Common	North side of Stites Hill Road	Post	1762; 1777^{*} 1789; 1816; 1823	1762	Demolished c. 1880	
Coulsdon Common	South side of Stites Hill Road	Post	1789; 1816; 1823	1777	Demolished 1924	
Cranford	Approximately; TQ 102 774			1604	Demolished 1625	
Cranham		Post		1463	1463	
Croydon	Crown Hill Mill					
Croydon	Gardiner's Mill; Croydon Mill	Post	1762; 1777^{*} 1789; 1816	1744	Demolished c. 1814	
Croydon	Black Mill	Post	1823	1814	Demolished c. 1855	
Croydon	White Mill	Smock		1828	Demolished c. 1862	
Croydon	Noakes's Mill	Tower	1863	1852	1863	
Dagenham	Becontree Heath Mill; TQ 495 867	Smock		1816	Burnt down January 1869	
Dagenham	Chadwell Heath Mill (north); Little Jenny; TQ 480 884	Post	1777	1765	1898	
Dagenham	Chadwell Heath Mill (west); Miss Bentley; TQ 480 883	Post	1903	1820	Demolished c. 1906	
Dagenham	Chadwell Heath Mill (south); Long Sally; TQ 481 883	Post		1785	Demolished c. 1893	
Dagenham	Beam Mill; TQ 501 832	Smock	1825	1825<	1884	
Deptford	Black Horse Fields Mill	Smock		1843	Burnt down 1854	
Deptford	Windmill Lane Mill		1832	1832	1832	
Deptford	Tanners Hill Mill	Post		1840	Demolished 1849	
Downe	Gorringes Farm Mill	Tower		1843	Burnt down 1902	
Dulwich	Dolwich Common Mill	Post		1814	1814	

=== E - F ===
Location	Name of mill and grid reference	Type	Maps	First mention or built	Last mention or demise	Photograph
Ealing				1318	Blown down c. 1409	
Ealing				1431	1431	
East Ham	TQ 420 831	Post		1267	1309	
East Ham	TQ 412 850		1724^{*}	1724	1728	
East Ham	TQ 419 819	Post		1741	1741	
East Ham	Clock House Farm Mill; TQ 427 833			1872	Burnt down c. 1891	
Edmonton				1272	1359	
Edmonton	Weir Hall Mill approximately TQ 328 926	Post		1627	1801	
Edmonton	Silver Street Mill; TQ 329 928	Post		1819	1920	
Eltham	Mottingham Mill					
Enfield				1284	1284	
Enfield	Windmill Hill; TQ 317 967	Post		1635	Blown down 18th century	
Enfield	Windmill Hill; TQ 317 967	Smock	1790	1790	Demolished September 1904	
Enfield	Mill Corner; TQ 247 976			1635	1740, gone by 1777	
Erith	Northumberland Heath Mill; TQ 502 772	Post		1843	Blown down 1 January c.1892 Windmill World	
Feltham	Lower Feltham; TQ 094 710		1762	1762	1762	
Finchley				1252	1398	
Finchley	Basings Pond			1627	1734, gone by 1754	
Finchley	Lodge Hill		1648	1648	1648	
Fulham				1404	1404	
Fulham	TQ 768 239		1790	1632	Demolished 1794	

=== G -H ===
Location	Name of mill and grid reference	Type	Maps	First mention or built	Last mention or demise	Photograph
Greenwich	Greenwich Reach Mill	Post				
Greenwich	Greenwich Reach Mill	Smock				
Hackney	Union Mill; TQ 341 834			1833	1851, gone by 1856	
Hackney	Regent's Canal	Vertical axle mill		1828	1828	
Hadley				1288	1288	
Hadley	Beacon Hill			1629	1629, gone by 1636	
Hadley	Beacon Hill			1649	1649, gone by 1698	
Hadley	Hadley Green; TQ 246 967			1821	1821, gone by 1827	
Hadley	Hadley Green; TQ 246 967			1827	1867, gone by 1870	
Hampstead				1270	Blown down 1294	
Hampstead				1295	1399	
Hampstead	Coneyfield	Post		1597	1661, gone by 1680	
Hampstead	Cloth Hill; TQ 263 861	Post		1614	1728, gone by 1759	
Hampstead	Highgate			1601	1601, gone by 1641	
Hampton	TQ 139 711	Smock		1791	Demolished 1874	
Hanwell				1258	1343	
Harrow				1236	1353	
Harrow	Sudbury Hill		1695	1622	1695	
Harrow	Sudbury Hill		1695	1695	1695	
Harrow	Wembley Hill		1673	1672	1693	
Havering	TQ 520 926	Post		1262	1262	
Hayes	Approximately; TQ 095 818		1675	1675	1675	
Hendon				1321	1321	
Hendon	Goldeherd's Mill			15th century	15th century	
Hendon	Mill Hill; TQ 223 934		1679	1679	1685	
Hillingdon				1328	1328	
Holborn	Gray's Inn; Approximately; TQ 313 819			1505	1505, gone by 1507	
Holborn	Old St Paul's	Post	1616	1616	1616	
Holborn	Old St Paul's, York Buildings Waterwirjs	Hollow Post		1684	Burnt down 1690	
Hornchurch		Post		1222	1256	
Hornchurch	New Mill; Marks Mill	Post		1355	1396	
Hornchurch	Marks Hall Mill; TQ 487 893	Post	1724	1365	Demolished c. 1760	
Hornchurch	Marks Mill; Marks Gate Mill; TQ 486 899	Smock		1818	Demolished May 1919	
Hornchurch	TQ 543 867	Post	1678	1678	Burnt down June 1921	
Hornchurch	TQ 510 838	Post		1240	1240	
Hornchurch	Marditch Mill; Mardyke Mill; TQ 510 840	Post	1724	1564	1724	
Hornchurch	Bush Elms Mill; TQ 528 880	Post		1833	1855, gone by 1864	
Hounslow				162	1362	
Hounslow	Brazil Mill; Approximately; TQ 115 744	Smock		1757	1757	
Hounslow	Syon Park	Vertical axle mill				
Hounslow	Hounslow Heath; TQ 119 752	Post	1816	1765	1816, gone by 1818	
Hounslow	Heston Mill; TQ 119 752	Post		1818	Burnt down 24 August 1895	

=== I - L ===
Location	Name of mill and grid reference	Type	Maps	First mention or built	Last mention or demise	Photograph
Isleworth				1370	1370	
Islington	Canonbury			1306	1306	
Islington	White Lead Mill; TQ 328 839	Tower		1786	1868	
Islington	White Lead Mill	Tower		1792	1868	
Islington	Cattle Market (two mills)	Hollow post		1820	1837	
Islington	Water Works	Tower		1730	1767	
Kensington	Hyde Park	Post		1543	1660	
Keston	Keston Mill; TQ 415 640	Post	1736; 1769	1716		
Keston	Olive's Mill			1878	Burnt down 1885	
Keston	Holwood Park Mill					
Kew	Kew Mill	Smock Mill		Late 18th century	Late 18th century	
Kingsbury	Redhill			1675	1738, gone by 1754	
Laleham				14th century	1698	
Laleham	TQ 705 055		1816	1816	1834	
Lambeth	South end of Waterloo Bridge	Paltrok	1658; 1720	1658	1760	
Lambeth	South end of Hungerford Bridge	Post	1762; 1763; 1777^{*}	1762	Demolished 1848	
Lambeth	Junction of Ethelred Street and Hutton Road		1762; 1763	1762	1763	
Lambeth	Junction of Newport Street and Whitgift Street	Smock		1753	1830	
Lambeth	Drug Mill	Tower		1737	Demolished 1867	
Lambeth	Cons Street Mill	Smock	1800; 1816	1800	Demolished c. 1840	
Lee				1843	Demolished c.1850	
Leyton	TQ 384 868	Post	1724^{*}	1724	1739	
Leyton	Temple Mills; TQ 376 855		1818	1770	1818, gone by 1838	
Limehouse		Paltrok mill		1663	Destroyed in a riot, 1663	
Limehouse		Smock		1768	Destroyed in a riot, 1768	
Limehouse		Smock		1791	1791	

=== M - P ===
Location	Name of mill and grid reference	Type	Maps	First mention or built	Last mention or demise	Photograph
Marylebone				1708	1708	
Mayfair	Bond Street		1647; 1666; 1675	1647	1675	
Mitcham Common	Mitcham Common Mill; TQ 292 678	Post		1806	Dismantled 1905; Windmill World	
Monthill				Early 17th century	Early 17th century	
Newington			1658; 1675; 1746^{*} 1763	1658	Demolished 1799	
North Ockendon	TQ 599 851	Post		1610	1840	
Northolt	Dabb's Hill Lane; TQ 1386 8552					
Northolt	Mill Post Field; TQ 1250 8250	Post mill				
Norton Folgate		Smock				
Norwood	Westow Hill Mill			1812	Demolished c. 1854	
Perivale				1342	1342	
Perivale				17th century	17th century	
Pinner				c. 1285	c. 1285	
Pinner	TQ 112 903			1619	Blown down 1721	
Pinner	TQ 112 903	Smock		1720s	Burnt down 1872	
Plumstead Common	Plumstead Common Mill; TQ 448 779	Tower		1820		
Poplar	Millwall, Browns Mill	Post	1723; 1731	1723	1781	
Poplar	Millwall, Smith's Mill	Post	1723; 1731	1723	1772	
Poplar	Millwall, Smith's Mill; Middle Mill	Post	1723; 1731	1723	1765	
Poplar	Millwall, Smith's Mill	Post	1723; 1731	1723	1731	
Poplar	Millwall, Baker's Mill	Post	1723; 1731	1703	1804	
Poplar	Millwall, Churn's Mill; Chinn's Mill	Post	1723; 1731	1723	1805	
Poplar	Millwall, Ward's Mill; Theobalds Mill	Post	1723; 1731	1723	1731	
Poplar	Millwall, Ward's Mill	Post	1723; 1731	1723	1731	
Poplar	Millwall (ninth mill)	Post	1723; 1731			
Poplar	Millwall (tenth mill)	Smock	1703; 1731; 1824	1703	1853, gone by 1859	
Poplar	Blackwall	Smock		1840	1840	

=== R - S ===
Location	Name of mill and grid reference	Type	Maps	First mention or built	Last mention or demise	Photograph
Richmond		Post	1635; 1673; 1733	1635	1730, gone by 1764	
Romford	Pratt Collier's Mill; TQ 507 884	Post		1728	1863, gone by 1868	
Romford	TQ 515 893	Post	1678	1618	1696	
Romford	Edward Collier's Mill; TQ 517 893	Post		1728	1861	
Romford	Rising Sun Mill; TQ 515 885	Post		1618	1871, gone by 1876	
Romford	Collier Row Mill; TQ 503 911	Post		1815	Demolished c. 1862	
Romford	Pettits Mill; TQ 513 903		1777	1775	1777	
Rotherhithe	Cuckold's Point Mills			1662 (three)	1810 (one)	
Ruislip	TQ 099 876			1294	1294	
Shadwell	TQ 354 807		1824	1824	1824	
Shirley	Shirley Mill; TQ 355 652	Post		1809	Burnt down October 1854	
Shirley	Shirley Mill; TQ 355 652	Tower		1855		
Shoreditch	TQ 335 836	Tower	1824	1782	1829	
Soho	Rathbone Place; TQ 249 819	Tower		1721	1787	
Soho	Windmill Field (believed near latter day Great Windmill Street, London W1)	Post mill (may have been rebuilt as a smock mill after about 1650)		Circa 1585	Late 18c	
Southall	Grand Junction Canal; TQ 144 797			1721	Demolished 1855	
Southall	TQ 143 809	Smock		1820s	1886	
Southwark	St George's Fields	Post		1616	1662	
Southwark	St Georges Fields	Post		1616	1677	
Southwark	Widflete Mill	Tower		1710	1724	
Southwark		Post	1746^{*}	1746	Demolished 1820	
Stanmore				Mid-13th century	Mid-13th century	
Stanmore				1352	1352	
Stanmore				1547	1547	
Stanmore	Grimsditch; TQ 168 940			1306	1680	
St Clement Danes	TQ 311 812	Post		1558	1615	
Stepney				1325	1342	
Stepney	Ratcliffe			1713	1713	
St George Hanover Square	TQ 287 183		1675	1675	1675, later moved to Mill Hill Place	
St George Hanover Square	Mill Hill Place					
St George Hanover Square	St George's Hospital; TQ 284 798	Hollow post		Mid-18th century	Mid-18th century	
St James's	TQ 296 807	Tower	1658	Early 17th century	1647	
Stoke Newington				1813	1852	
Streatham	Streatham Mill		1816; 1823	1816	1823	
St Sepulchre	Newgate Prison	Hollow post		1752	Demolished 1778	
Surbiton	Surbiton Hill Mill		1816; 1823	1805	Demolished 1850	
Sydenham	Sydenham Mill			19th century	19th century	

=== T - W ===
Location	Name of mill and grid reference	Type	Maps	First mention or built	Last mention or demise	Photograph
Totteridge				1277	1277	
Twickenham				14th century	14th century	
Twickenham			1635	1635	1635	
Twickenham	Approximately; TQ 138 729		1635	1635	1675, gone by 1743	
Twickenham	Whitton			1722	1722	
Twickenham	Fulwell Watermill; TQ 144 728			1799	1799	
Upminster	Upminster Common Mill; TQ 558 904	Post	1724^{*}	1652	Demolished 1882	
Upminster	Abraham's Mill; TQ 557 868	Smock		1803		
Walthamstow	Walthamstow Mill; TQ 395 910	Post	1700; 1805	1676	Blown down c. 1800	
Wandsworth		Post		1535	Moved to Wimbledon Common c. 1613	
Wandsworth	Middle Mill		1762; 1777	1762	1835	
Wandsworth	Brazil Mill	Smock		1811	Sail-less in 1825, demolished later	
Wandsworth	Wandsworth Common Mill; TQ 267 745	Smock mill		1837		
Wandsworth	Blackmore's Mill					
West Ham	City Mill River Mill (north); TQ 379 838	Post		1774	Moved to Shirley, Surrey c. 1809	
West Ham	City Mill River Mill (south); TQ 380 838	Post	1746	1746	Moved to Nobshill c. 1807	
West Ham	St Thomas’ Mill; TQ 380 834	Post		1702	1724, gone by 1730	
West Ham	St Thomas’ Mill; TQ 380 834	Post	1746	1730	1746	
West Ham	Pudding Mill; TQ 379 836	Post	1777^{*}	1724	1844, gone by 1854	
West Ham	Nobshill Mill; TQ 376 841	Post		1807	1870	
West Ham	Stent's Mill; Redcross Mill; TQ 381 839	Post	1724; 1746; 1777^{*}	1720	1849	
West Ham	Three Mills; TQ 348 827	Post	1724; 1746	1699	1837, gone by 1840	
West Ham	Abbey Mill; TQ 388 833	Post		1682	Blown down 1701	
West Ham	Abbey Mill; TQ 388 833	Smock		1703	Demolished c. 1767	
West Ham	Abbey Mill	Smock		1768	Burnt down 30 April 1862	
West Ham	Pigeon's Mill (north); TQ 397 847	Smock	1746	1746	1746	
West Ham	Pigeon's Mill (south); TQ 397 846	Smock	1724; 1746; 1777^{*}	1724	Demolished October 1860	
West Ham	TQ 411 814			1668	1752	
West Ham	TQ 398 853		1825	1825	1825	
West Ham	TQ 401 811			1739	1739	
West Ham	Industrial School		1893	1854	Demolished c. 1893	
Westminster				1279	1306	
Westminster	White Lead Mill, Millbank	Smock		c. 1800	c. 1800	
Westminster	The Strand	Post	1616	1615	1696	
West Norwood				1433	1496	
West Norwood		Post	1635	1611	1676	
Whitechapel	Fieldgate Street; TQ 343 816	Post		1643	1658	
Whitechapel	Fieldgate Street; TQ 342 814	Smock	1724	1724	1807	
Whitechapel	Commercial Road			1806	1806	
Willesden				1295	Demolished 1365	
Willesden	Dudden Hill; Approximately; TQ 218 854	Post		1616	1817	
Willesden	Kilburn Mill; TQ 245 848	Smock		1803	Burnt down 1863	
Wimbledon Common	Tibbett's Corner Mill	Post		c. 1613	1636	
Wimbledon Common	Wimbledon Common Mill; TQ 230 725	Hollow post, rebuilt as Smock in 1893		1816		
Woodford	TQ 400 920		1678	1628	1710	
Woolwich	Co-operative Mill			1760	Burnt down 16 March 1760	
Woolwich	Co-operative Mill	Smock	1769	1760	1845	

== Maps ==
- c.1563 "Woodcut" (or "Agas") map of London
- 1610 John Speed
- 1616 John Visscher
- 1626
- 1635 Moses Glover (Map of the Isleworth Hundred)
- 1647 Wenceslas Hollar (Long View of London from Bankside)
- 1648 John Norden
- 1658 William Faithorne
- 1659 William Faithorne
- 1660 Frederick De Wit
- 1666 Ben Gerlen
- 1673 Richard Blome
- 1675 John Ogilby
- 1678 John Ogilby & William Morgan
- 1695 Robert Morden
- 1695^{*}Robert Morden
- 1696 Robert Morden
- 1700 Robert Morden & John Pask
- 1700^{*}
- 1703 Joel Gascoigne (survey of the Parish of Stepney)
- 1720 Dr Harris
- 1723 Sutton Nicholl (A prospect of Greenwich & London)
- 1724 Sutton Nicholl (View of London and Southwark)
- 1724^{*} John Warburton, Joseph Bland & Payler Smith
- 1729 John Sennex
- 1731 C du Box (A view of Greenwich)
- 1733 John Seller
- 1736 Emanuel Bowen
- 1742 John Seller
- 1746 John Rocque
- 1746^{*} John Rocque
- 1753 Emanuel Bowen
- 1754 John Rocque
- 1762 John Rocque
- 1763 John Rocque
- 1769 Andrews, Dury and Herbert
- 1777 John Chapman and Peter André
- 1777^{*}Andrews & Dury
- 1789 Lindley & Crosley
- 1790 William Faden
- 1800 Laurie & Whittle
- 1816 Ordnance Survey
- 1818 Christopher & John Greenwood
- 1819 Ordnance Survey
- 1830 Ordnance Survey
- 1823 Bryant
- 1824 Christopher Greenwood (Map of London)
- 1825 Christopher Greenwood
- 1832 Cary (Map of Deptford)
- 1843 Ordnance Survey
- 1844 Ordnance Survey
- 1850 C Knight
- 1863 Ordnance Survey
- 1893 Ordnance Survey
- 1903 Ordnance Survey

== Notes ==
Mills in bold are still standing, known building dates are indicated in bold. Text in italics denotes indicates that the information is not confirmed, but is likely to be the case stated.

Bexleyheath

May Place Mill, listed in Watermills and Windmills under Bexleyheath, actually stood just within Crayford, and has an entry at the List of windmills in Kent.

Finsbury Fields

The last of the Finsbury Fields windmills was demolished c. 1750 to make way for St Luke's Hospital for the Clergy.

Millwall

Three mills were standing in 1835, two in 1845. The last mill standing was the smock mill, as detailed above.

== Sources ==
Unless indicated otherwise, the source for all entries is Blythman, Guy (1996). Watermills & Windmills of Middlesex. Baron Birch. ISBN 0-86023-538-6..
