= Wellington Mill =

Wellington Mill may refer to:

- Wellington Mill, Barking, windmill in Barking, London
- Wellington Mill, building in Stockport, Greater Manchester, now Hat Works
- Wellington Mill, Western Australia, locality in Western Australia
