= Plumstead Common =

Park in Plumstead, London, England

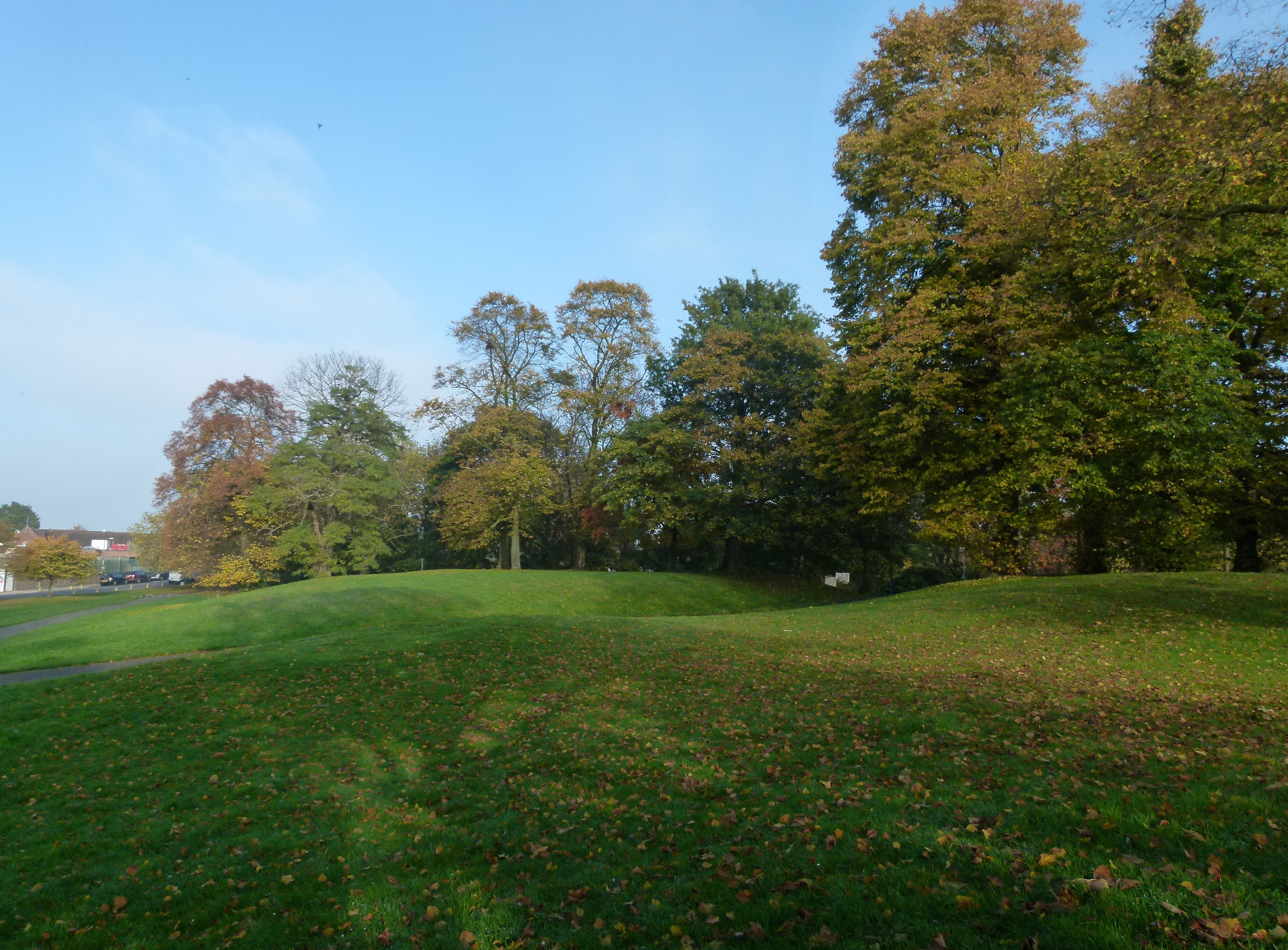
- Autumnal view (near Plumstead Common Road)
- Interactive map of Plumstead Common
- Type: common land, urban park
- Location: Plumstead, London
- Coordinates: 51.482042°N 0.078020°E
- Area: 41.7 hectares (103 acres)
- Public transit: Plumstead railway station

Plumstead Common is a common and urban park in Plumstead in the Royal Borough of Greenwich (SE18), south-east London. It is part of the South East London Green Chain.

== Location and geology ==
Plumstead Common is bound to the north by Old Mill Road and to the south by Plumstead Common Road. To the east lies Winn or Winn's Common.

The common contains deposits of puddingstone, a conglomerate rock formed during a period of global warming 60 million years ago. The rock is more usually found north of the River Thames in Hertfordshire, see Hertfordshire puddingstone.

== History ==
Plumstead Common was first mentioned in the Domesday Book in 1086 ("Plumstede"). The name refers to a place where plums grow.

Plumstead Common Act 1878
- Act of Parliament
- Parliament of the United Kingdom
- Long title: An Act for effecting a transfer to the Metropolitan Board of Works of the open spaces known as Plumstead Common and Shoulder-of-Mutton Green, and for enabling them to preserve, improve, and regulate the same, and to erect a lodge upon Blackheath.
- Citation: 41 & 42 Vict. c. cxlv

Dates
- Royal assent: 4 July 1878

Text of statute as originally enacted

In the 19th century more and more common land was sold off to build houses for the growing workforce at Royal Arsenal. The arrival of the railways sped up this process. The people of Plumstead protested that they had the right to graze their livestock on the land of Plumstead Common and to use it for sports and recreation. In June 1876 these protests attracted the Irish activist John De Morgan who on 1 July led protestors up from Woolwich Arsenal to the house of Edwin Hughes (leader of the Conservative Party) tearing down illegally erected fences on their way. John De Morgan was arrested and sent to prison for seventeen days. The riots resulted in the Plumstead Common Act 1878 (41 & 42 Vict. c. cxlv) ensuring that one hundred acres of land remained as public open space forever.

Royal Arsenal F.C.'s first home was playing on the common.

== Heritage buildings and cultural events ==
Substantial remains of the Old Mill still stand and have been incorporated into the public house of the same name. Nearby is Plumstead Manor School. On the southwest corner of the common stands the former Prince of Wales pub.

Plumstead Common is the venue for the Plumstead Make Merry event, which is the longest-running community festival in the Royal Borough of Greenwich and is run on a voluntary basis by a group of people who are passionate about the local area. Plumstead Common is also the venue for the popular Asian Mela, which has been described as the "Asian Notting Hill Carnival".

== Photo gallery ==
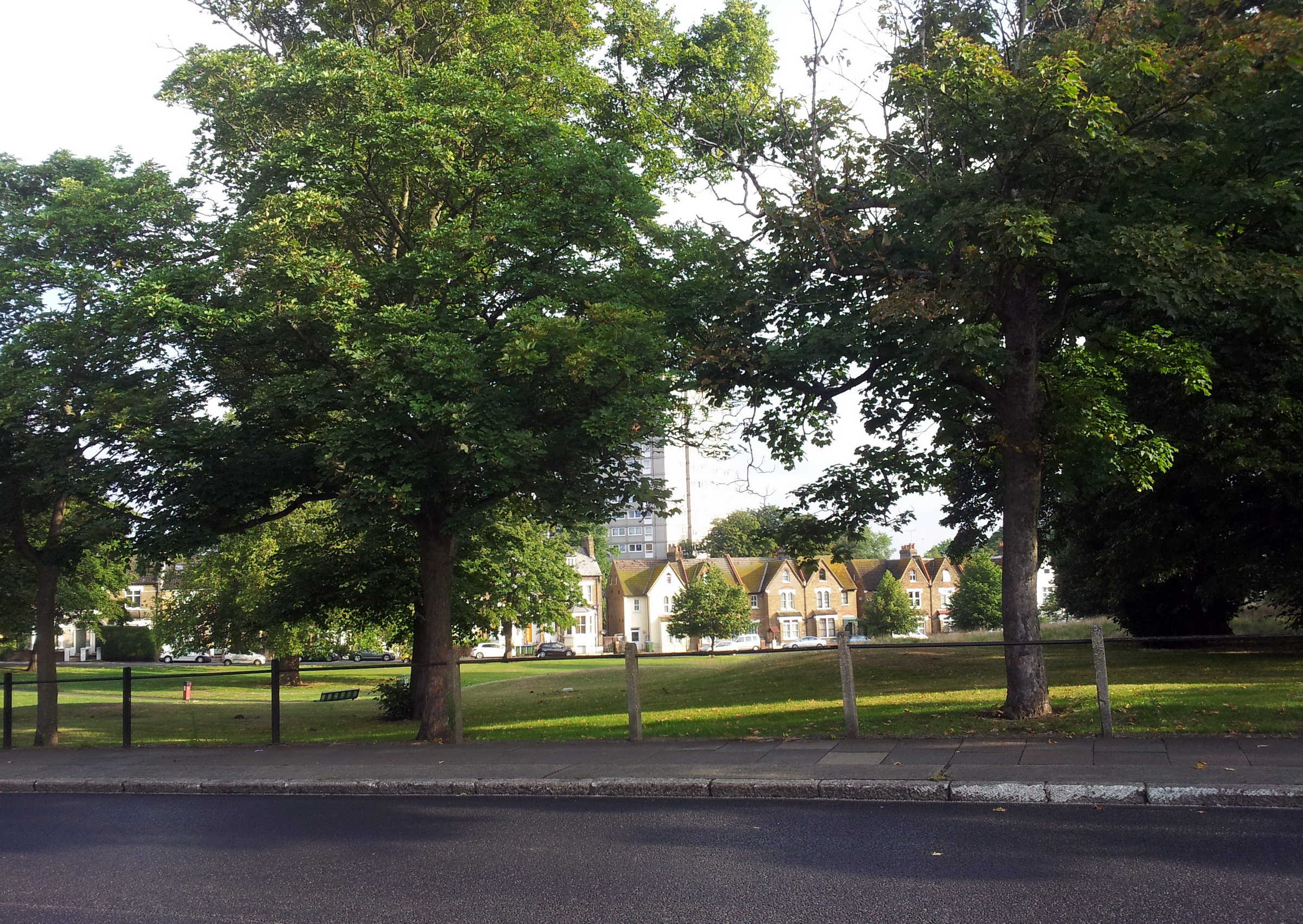
Plumstead Common Road

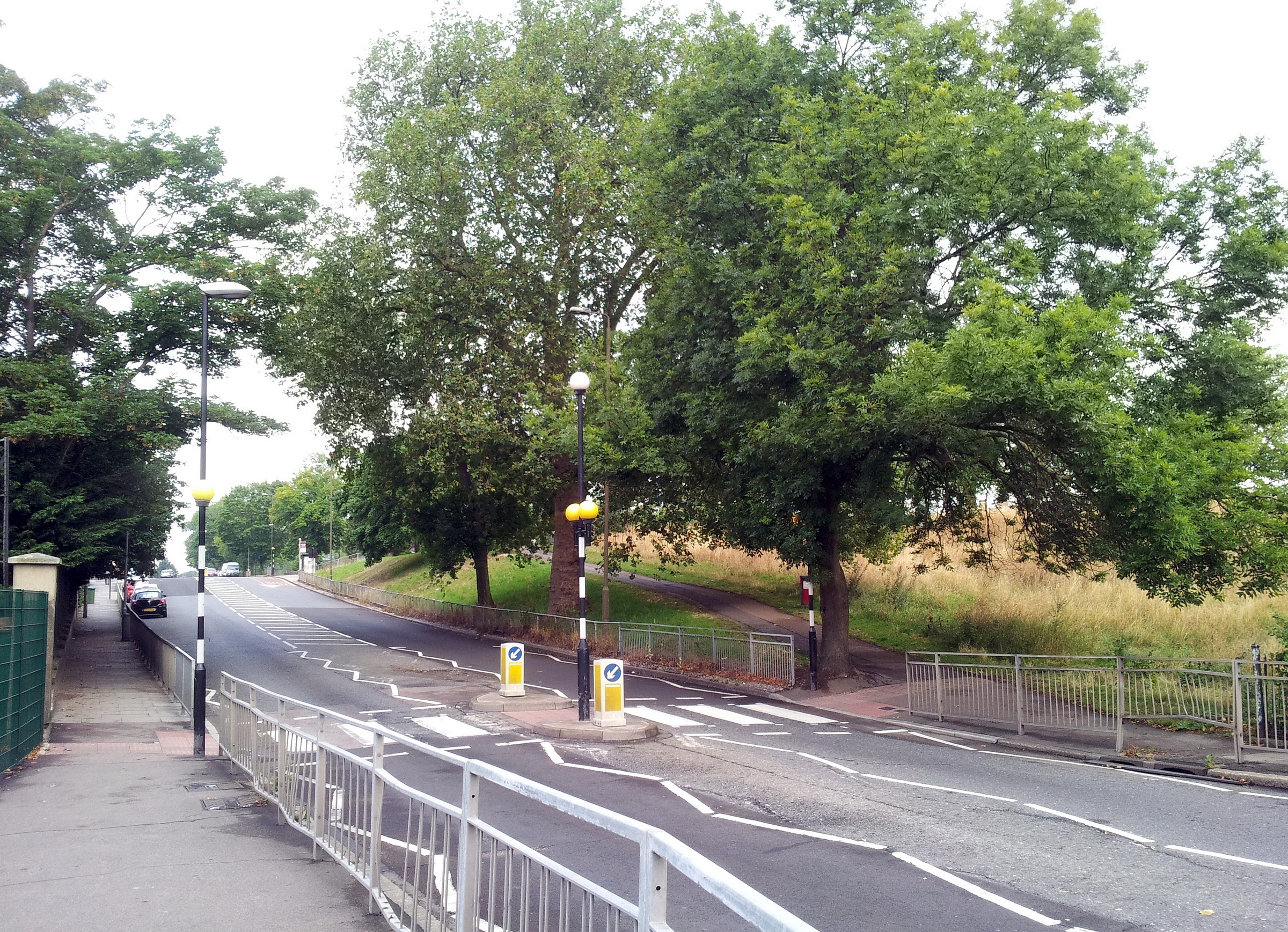
Plumstead Common Road

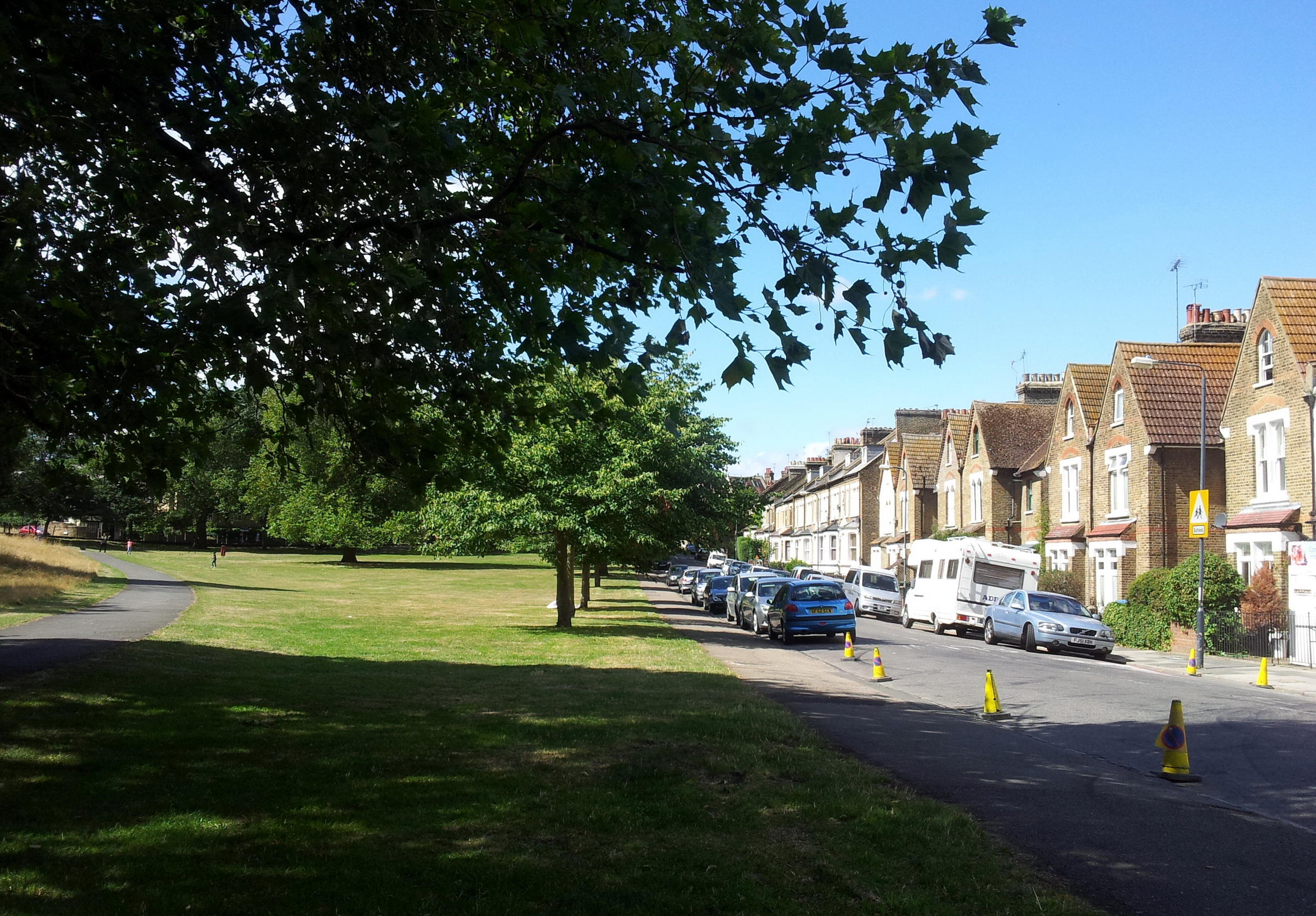
St Margarets Grove

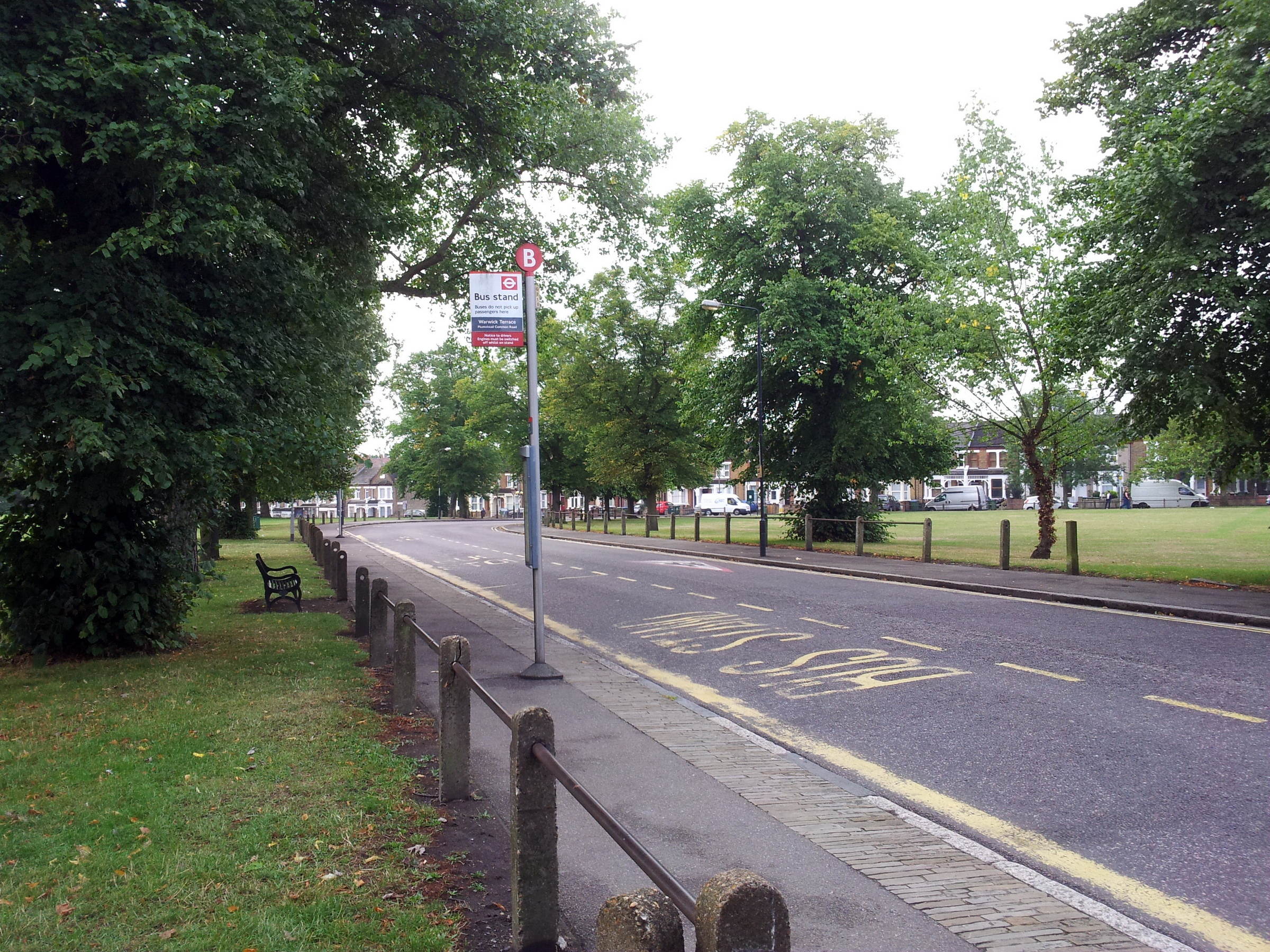
Bus stand Warwick Terrace

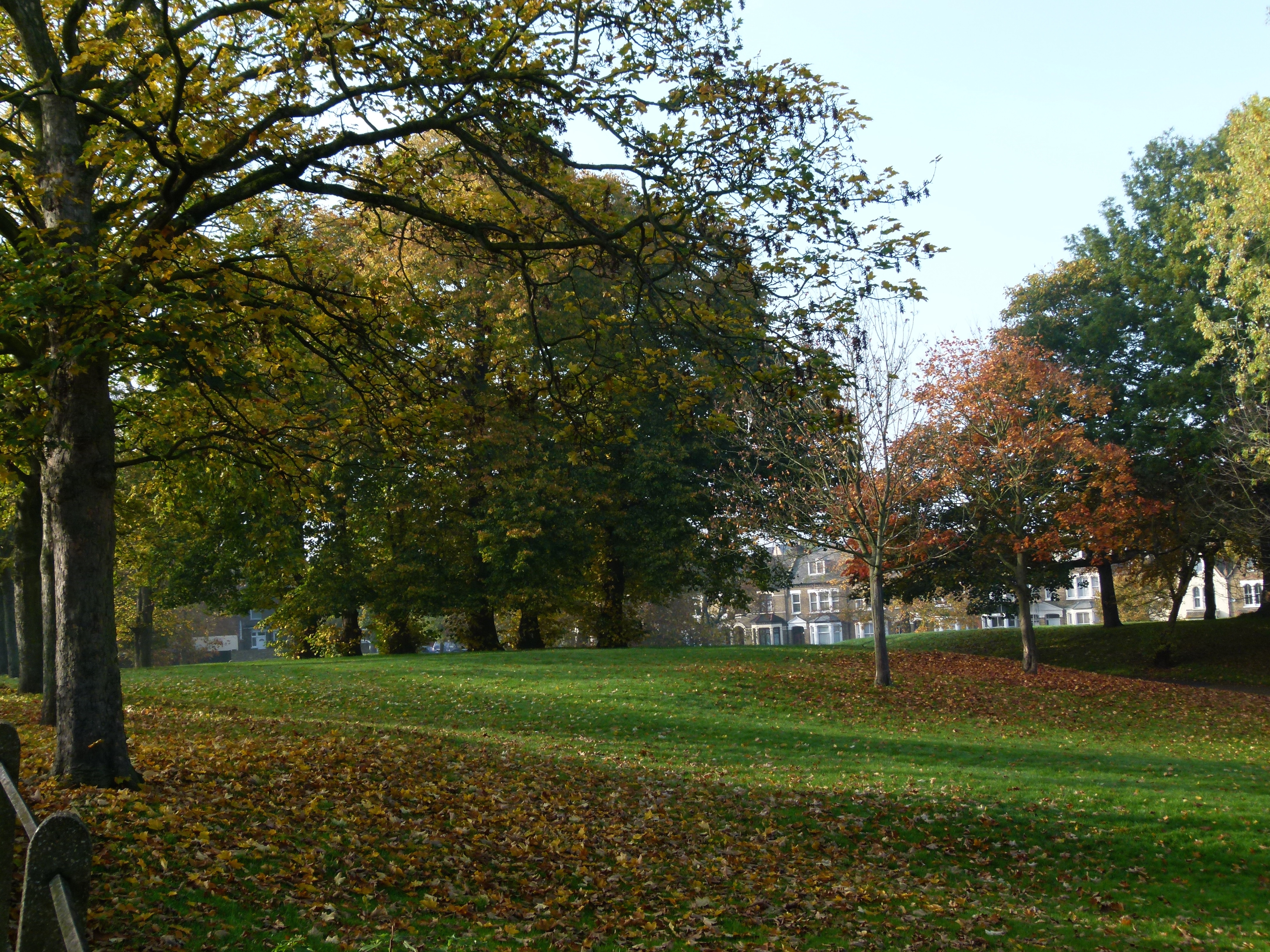
Western part of the common

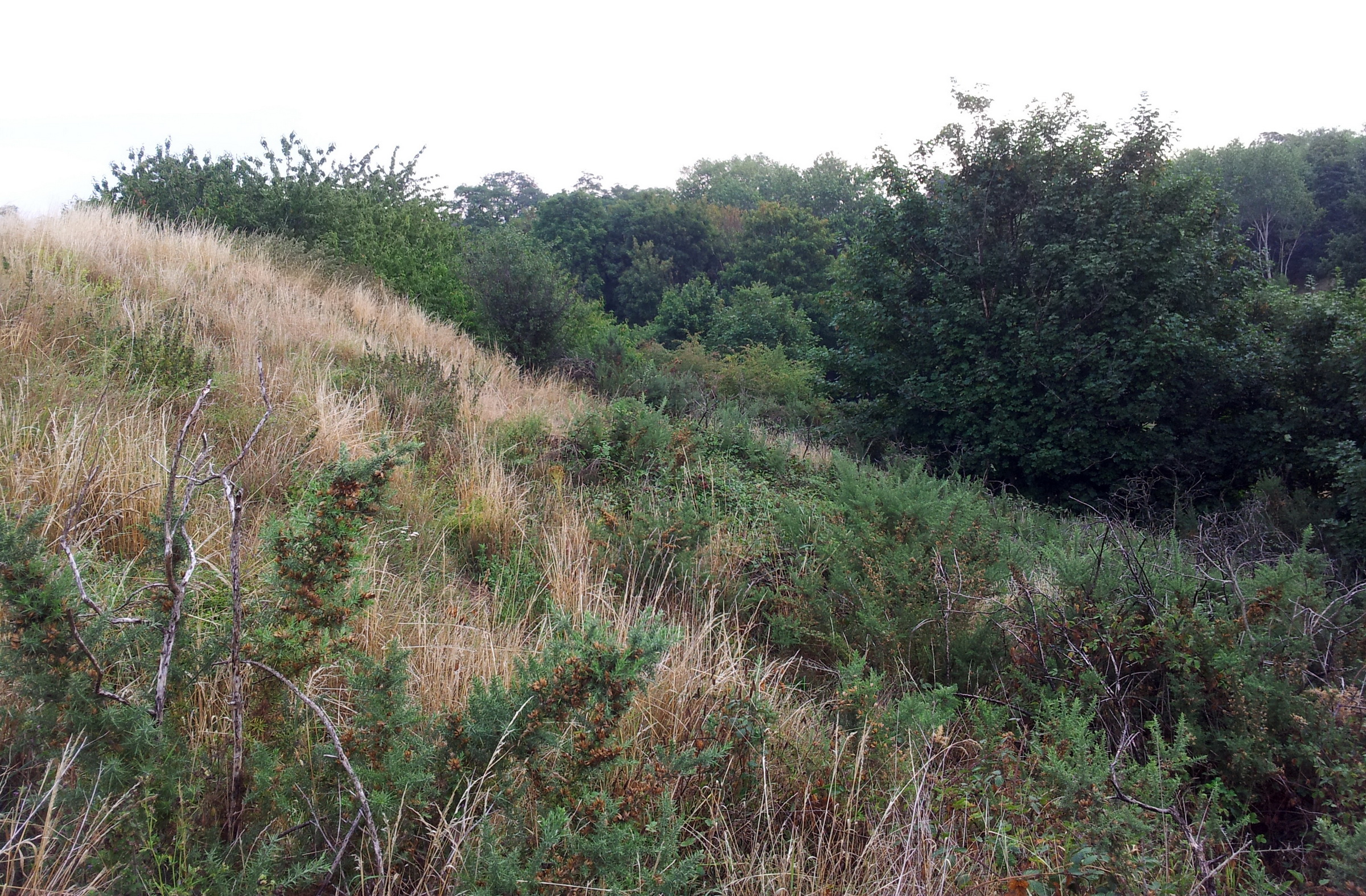
Eastern part of the common

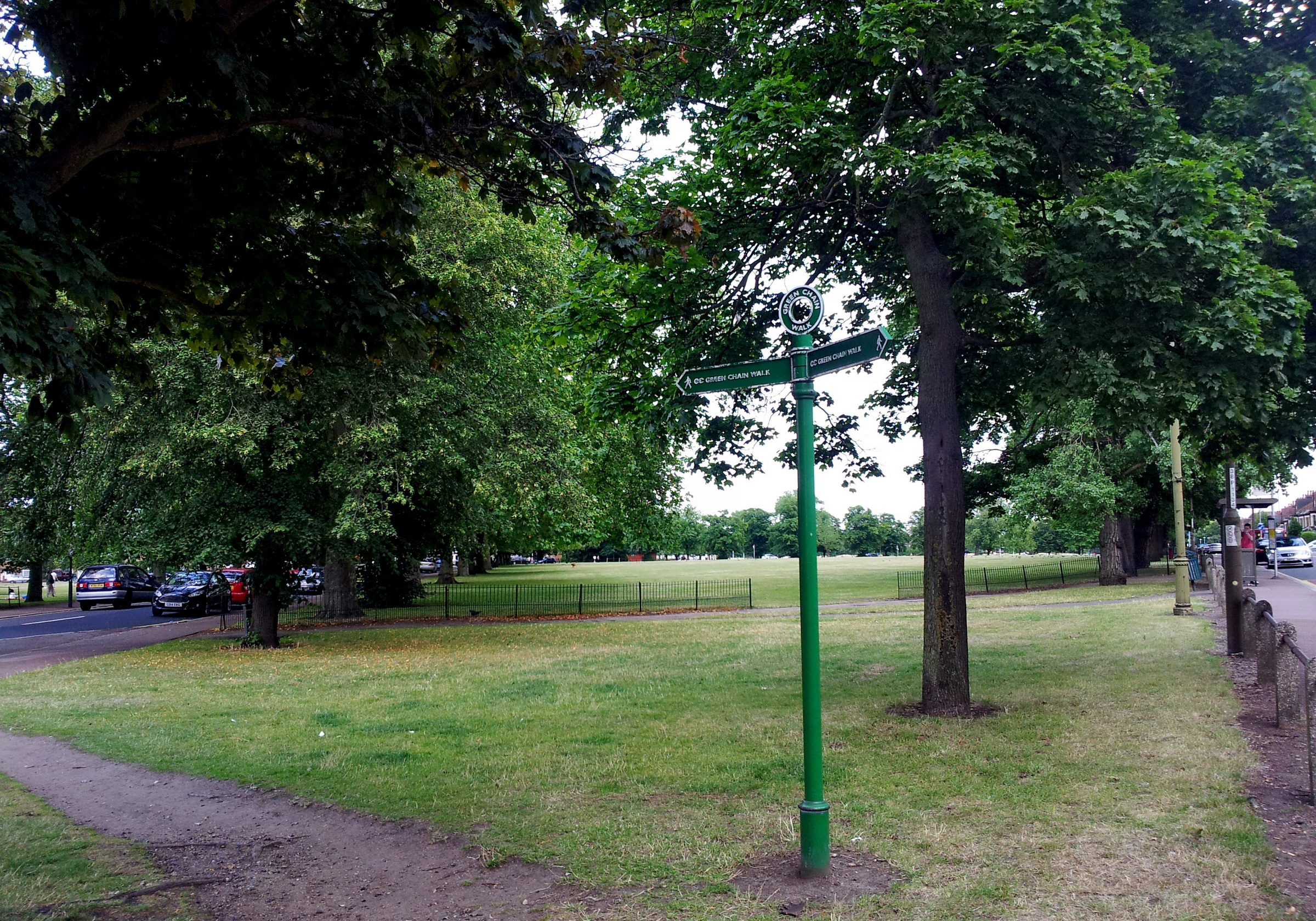
Green Chain Walk

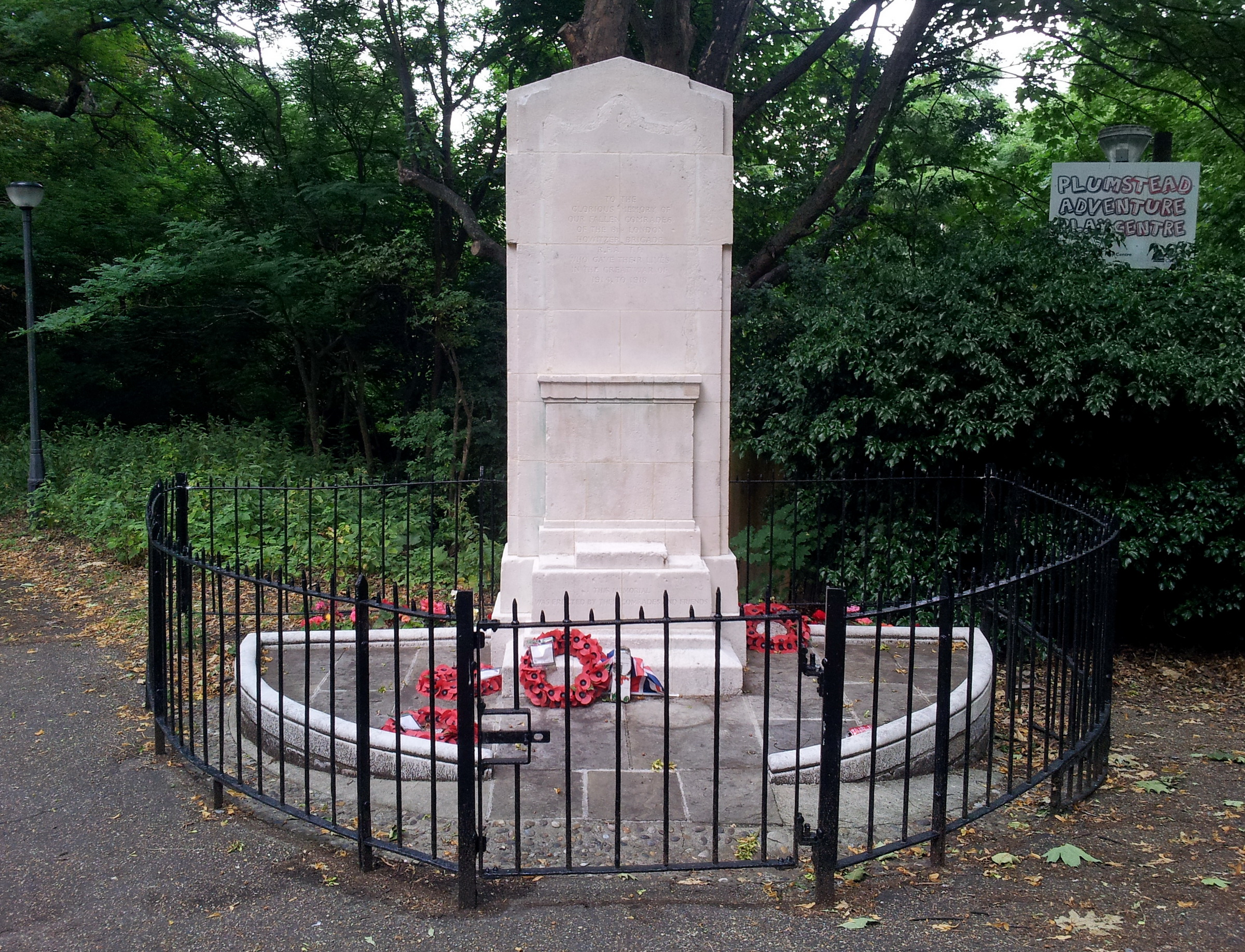
World War I memorial

== See also ==
- Plumstead Common Windmill
- Winn's Common
- Woolwich cemetery
