= John Ruskin College =

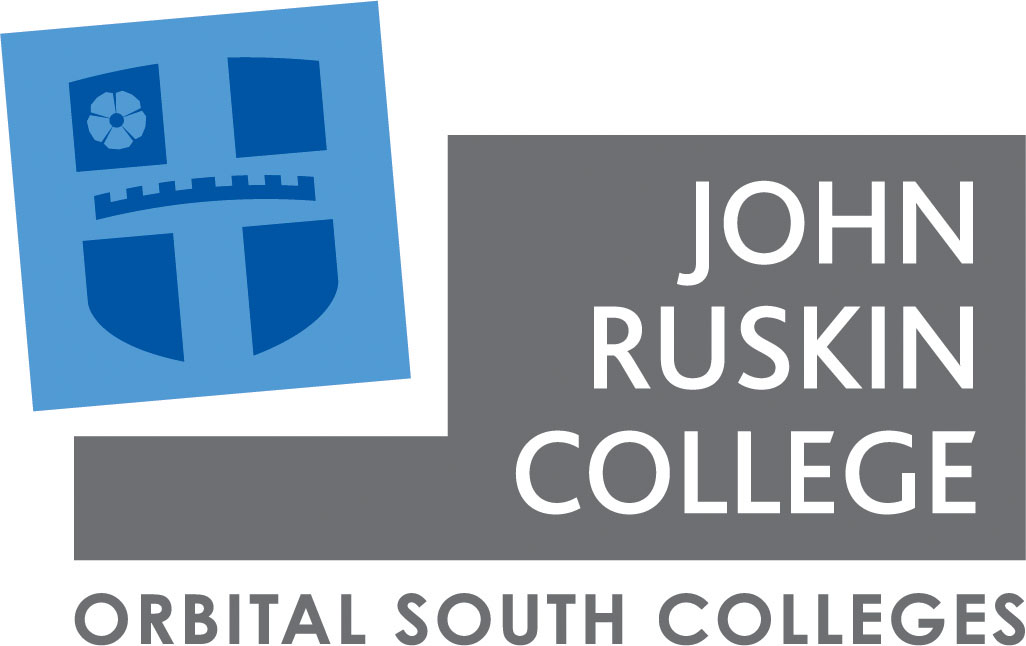

Location
- Selsdon Park Road (A2022); South Croydon, Greater London, CR2 8JJ; United Kingdom; 51.351°N 0.043°W

Information
- Type: Further education
- Established: 1920-1988 – founding institutions 1988 – John Ruskin College; 2019 – constituent college of Orbital South Colleges
- Local authority: Croydon
- Department for Education URN: 130434 Tables
- Ofsted: Reports
- Head teacher: Lindsay Pamphilon
- Age: 16++
- Enrolment: 1,800+ (2017)
- Website: www.johnruskin.ac.uk

John Ruskin College is a further education college in South Croydon offering full-time vocational courses and apprenticeships as well as part-time courses for adults.

In 2019, following a merger with East Surrey College incorporating Reigate School of Art, John Ruskin College became part of Orbital South Colleges.

John Ruskin College is located on Selsdon Park Road (A2022), close to the A212 roundabout. The College is accessible by tram via Gravel Hill tram stop, as well as various local bus services.

== History ==
=== Early years ===
John Ruskin College was a former school in the London Borough of Croydon, which started life in 1920 as the John Ruskin Boys' Central School. Its location was Scarbrook Road, Croydon. Named after John Ruskin, it opened on 12 January 1920. The Lady Edridge School, its sister school for girls (later to become a grammar school in 1951) opened the same day. Lady Edridge was wife of a Mayor of Croydon and the first "Lady Freeman" of the Borough. It closed in 1980 and was demolished.

=== Grammar and comprehensive school ===
In 1935 the school moved to Tamworth Road, and in April 1945 it was granted grammar school status as the John Ruskin Grammar School for Boys (JRGS). It had been previously the John Ruskin Selective Central School. It moved to Upper Shirley Road, Shirley, in 1955, and was retitled the John Ruskin High School in 1971 before later becoming a 14-18 Co-Educational Comprehensive School. It was demolished in 1991. The Upper Shirley Road site surrounded the Shirley Windmill, a 19th-century tower mill. The upper forms transferred to Selsdon to form the present John Ruskin College, utilising the premises previously known as John Newnham Secondary Selective School, named after a 20th-century town clerk of the old County Borough of Croydon.

=== The current College ===
The current College was established in 1988 following re-organisation of post-16 studies in Croydon. It merged with East Surrey College in February 2019, creating Orbital South Colleges group.

== Courses ==
A range of Full-time vocational courses are available for students:

- Access to Higher Education
- Applied Science
- Aviation, Travel & Tourism
- Business, Accounting & IT
- Construction
- Creative Arts (Digital Media, Games Design, Art, Design, Photography)
- Early Years & Childcare
- Engineering
- ESOL (English for Speakers of Other Languages)
- Hair & Beauty and Spa
- Health & Social Care
- Life Skills
- Life Skills SEND
- Public Services
- Sport

The college also provides a range of Apprenticeship programmes.

== Notable alumni and faculty ==
=== John Ruskin College ===
- Feroz Abbasi, a former detainee at Camp X-Ray
- Author and journalist Malcolm Muggeridge briefly taught at the school several times while a student, where his father, Henry Muggeridge, was chairman of the governors
- Les Nemes, bassist, who later formed Haircut One Hundred with Nick Heyward

=== John Ruskin Grammar School ===
- Mick Ford, screenwriter and actor
- Roy Hodgson, former England football manager until 2016, former manager of Inter Milan, Fulham, Liverpool and Crystal Palace F.C.
- Bob Houghton, football manager
- Steve Kember, footballer with Crystal Palace
- Air Vice-Marshal Richard Lacey, station commander from 1997 to 1999 of RAF Benson, commander from 2003 to 2005 of the Military of the Falkland Islands
- Lennie Lawrence, football manager
- Alan McKenna (actor), actor, screen writer
- Ralph McTell, singer-songwriter
- Sir Bob Phillis, chief executive from 1997 to 2006 of the Guardian Media Group, and since 2004 of All3Media, and from 1994 to 1997 of BBC Worldwide, and from 1991 to 1993 of ITN
- Prof Terence Rabbitts, Professor of Molecular Biology, Weatherall Institute of Molecular Medicine, University of Oxford, UK
- Jamie Reid, artist who designed the Sex Pistols' album cover for Never Mind the Bollocks, Here's the Sex Pistols, and most of their singles
