= Perilous Pond =

Ancient pond in London, England

Coordinates: 51.5263°N 0.0894°W

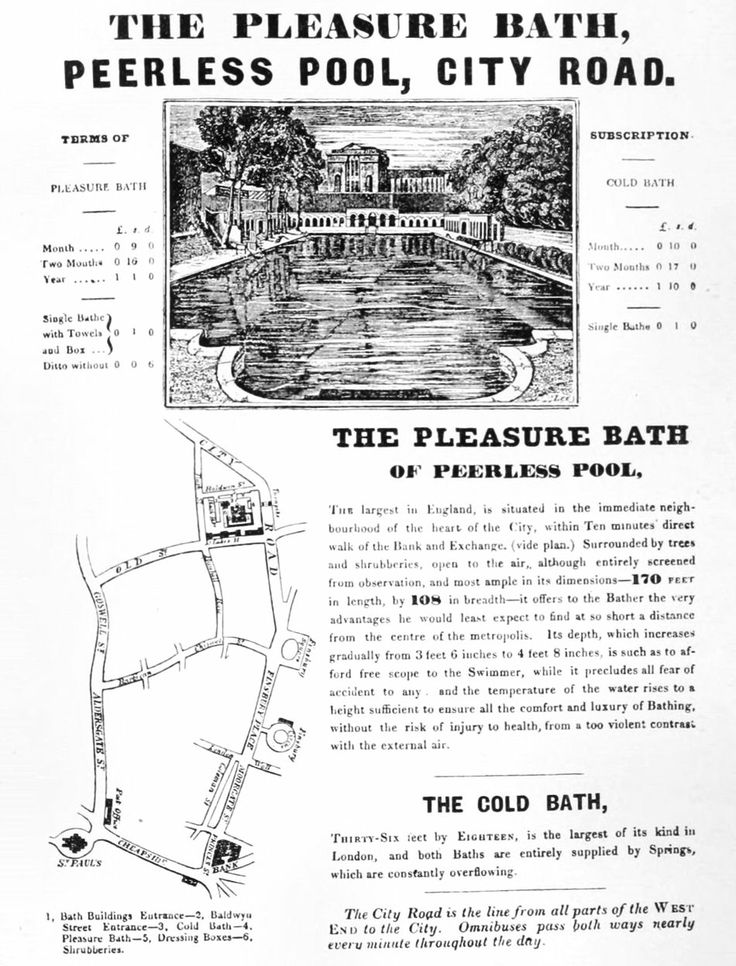
A handbill of 1846 advertising The Pleasure Bath, Peerless Pool

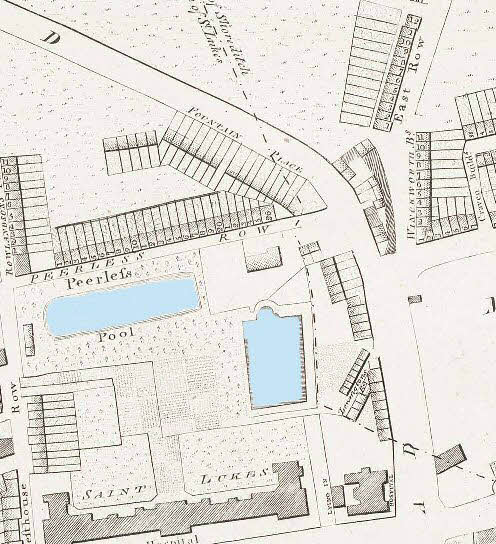
Peerless Pool plan from c1800. Bathing pool to the east, fishing pool to the north. The asylum named St Luke's Hospital for Lunatics is to the south.

The Perilous Pond, sometimes spelt Perelous, was an ancient pond fed by a spring in London located near the junction of modern-day Old Street and City Road. It gained its name from many tragic drownings there of people using it as a swimming hole. It was also used by fishermen and wildfowlers .

In 1743 the pond was purchased by William Kemp, a jeweller, who developed it by enclosing it in stone edging and adding marble steps and a gravel bottom. He built a separate pond for fishing and renamed the site the more enticing Peerless Pool. The grounds were screened by trees and the pool was used as an ice rink in winter. Kemp imposed an annual admission charge of £1 10s. (or 1s. for day visitors). The pool was 170 ft long x 108 ft wide and from 3–5 feet deep. It was London's first outdoor public swimming pool.

From 1790 there was also a small library and a bowling green attached.

Around 1805, the lease was acquired by Joseph Watts, who drained the fish pond and constructed Baldwin Street on that part of the site. The business provided the family with a comfortable living. Richard Garnett mentions that his colleague Thomas Watts (1811-1869), "keeper of printed books at the British Museum" (i.e. what would now be a senior position at the British Library), had his education paid for by the profits from the family business.

William Hone, the satirist, visited the pool in 1826 and described it thus:-

“Trees enough remain to shade the visitor from the heat of the sun on the brink. On a summer evening it is amusing to survey the conduct of the bathers; some boldly dive, others timorous stand and then descend step by step, unwilling and slow; choice swimmers attract attention by divings and somersaults, and the whole sheet of water sometimes rings with merriment. Every fine Thursday and Saturday afternoon in the summer columns of Bluecoat boys, more than a score in each, headed by their respective beadles, arrive and some half strip themselves ‘ere they reach their destination. The rapid plunges they make into the Pool and their hilarity in the bath testify their enjoyment of the tepid fluid.”

The pool was closed in 1850 and built over. Its gives its name to the nearby Peerless Street and Bath Street and obliquely to the Old Fountain public house.
