= Winn's Common =

Open space in Plumstead, London, England

Coordinates: 51°28′52″N 0°5′35″E

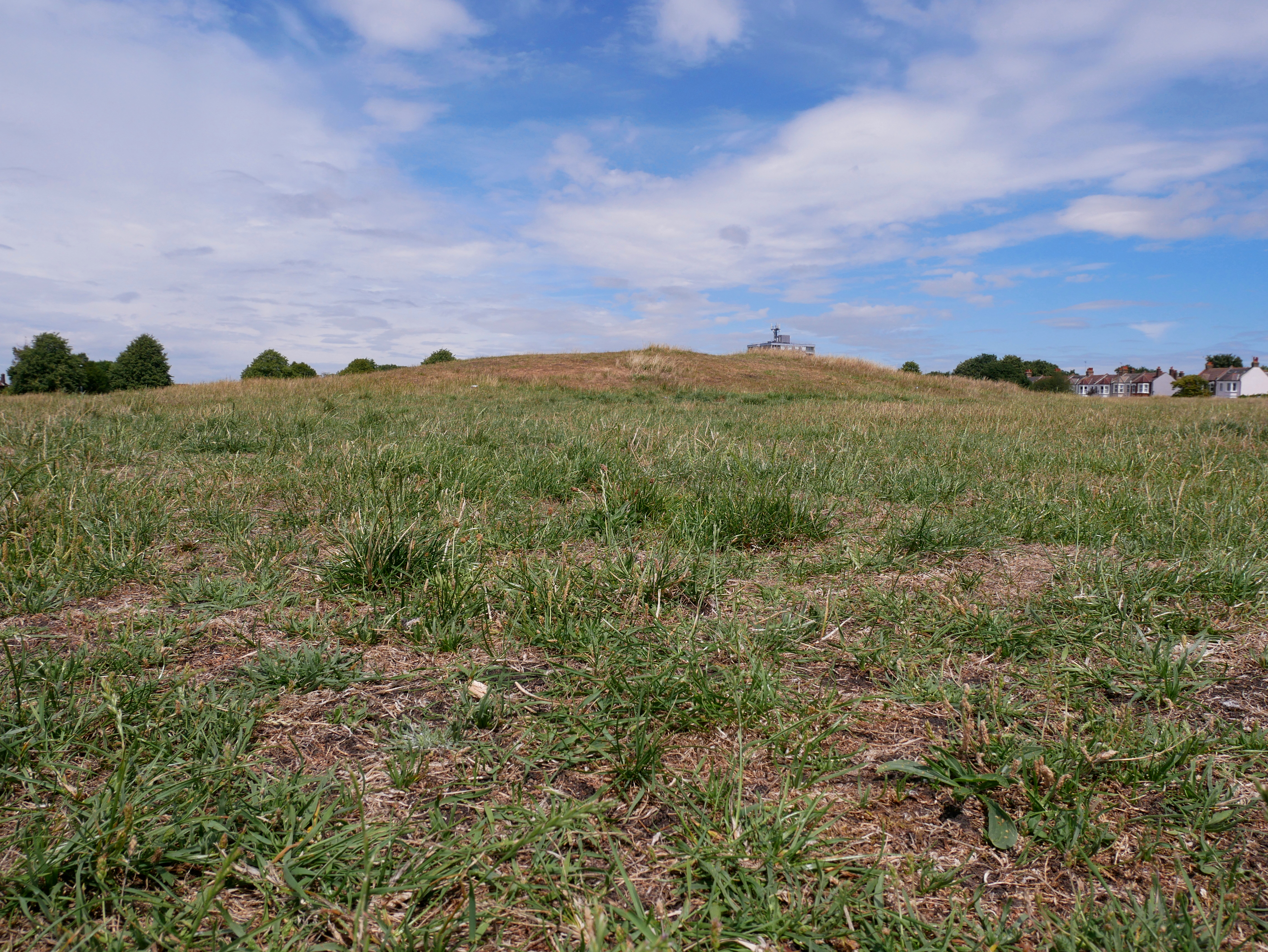
The Bronze Age tumulus on Winn's Common

Winn's Common is a public open space in Plumstead in the Royal Borough of Greenwich, England.

== History ==
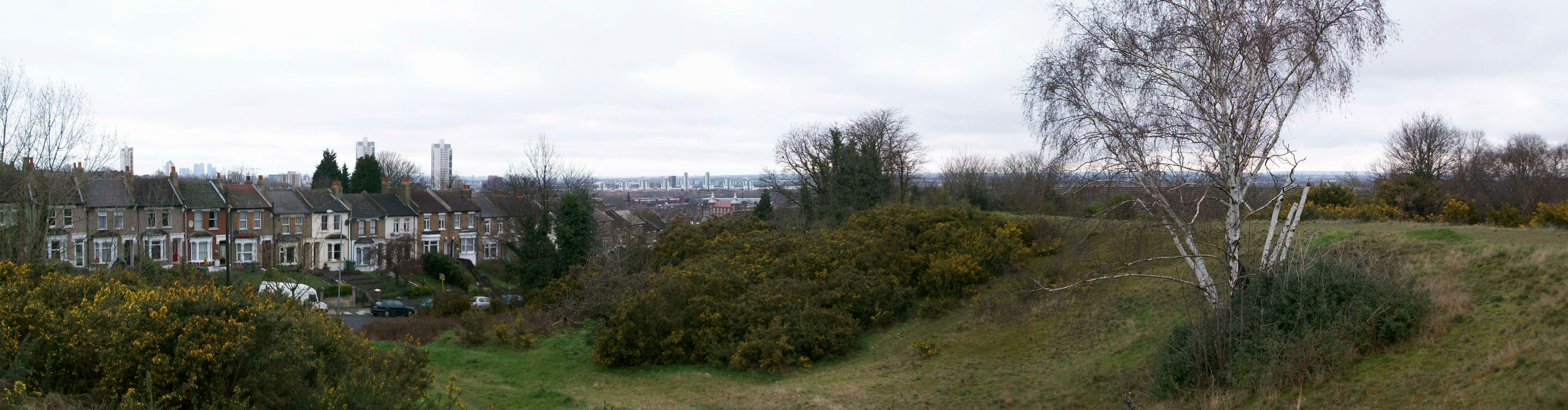
The North end of Winn's Common

Winn's Common is said to have been settled by ancient Britons. Several Bronze Age burial mounds were found in the area, as well as Roman relics. One mound remains on Winn's Common, the Winn's Common Tumulus.

During World War II a line of barrage balloons were sited on Winn's Common to deter enemy aircraft from attacking the Royal Arsenal, Woolwich.

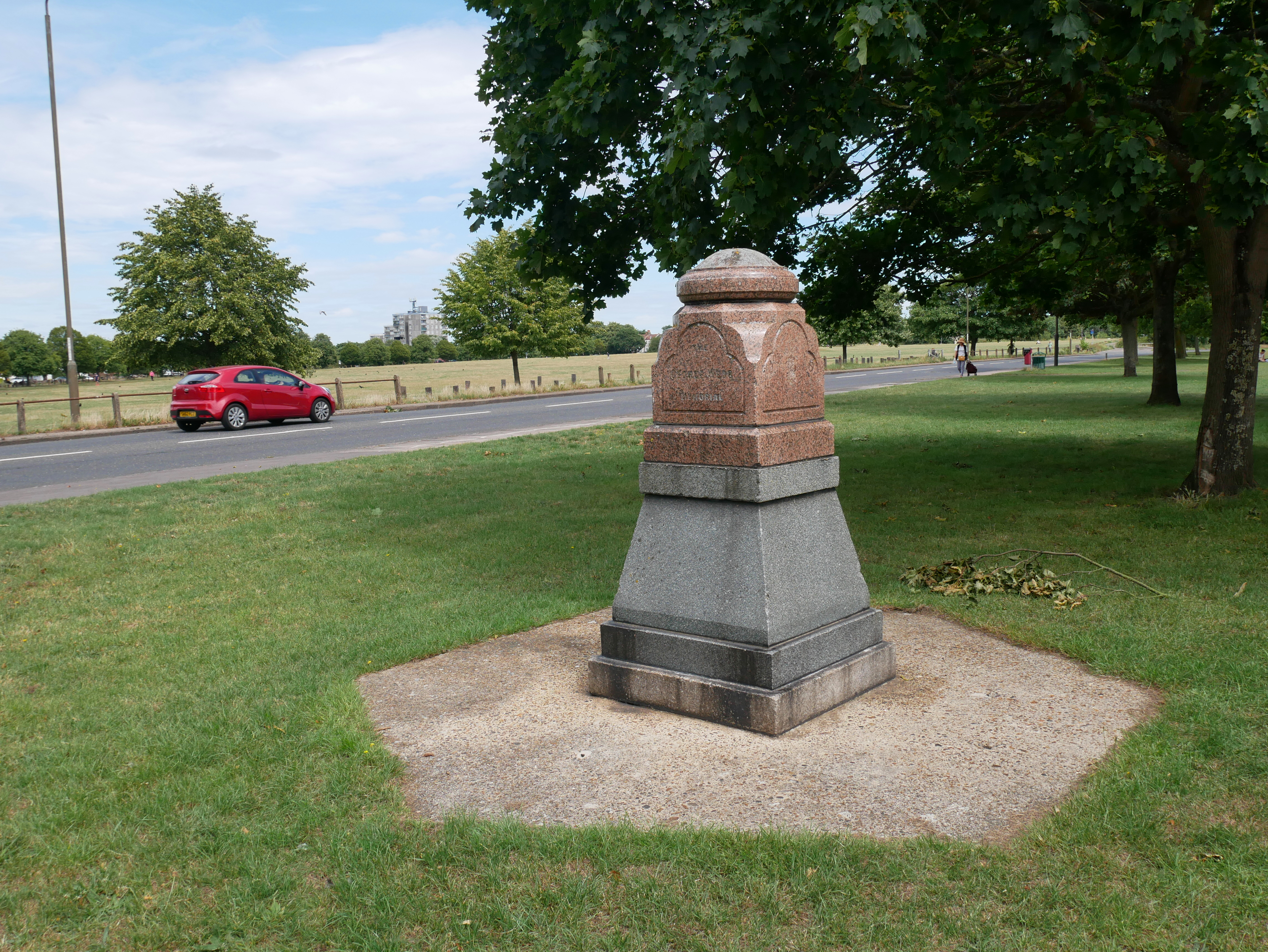
The George Webb Memorial Fountain

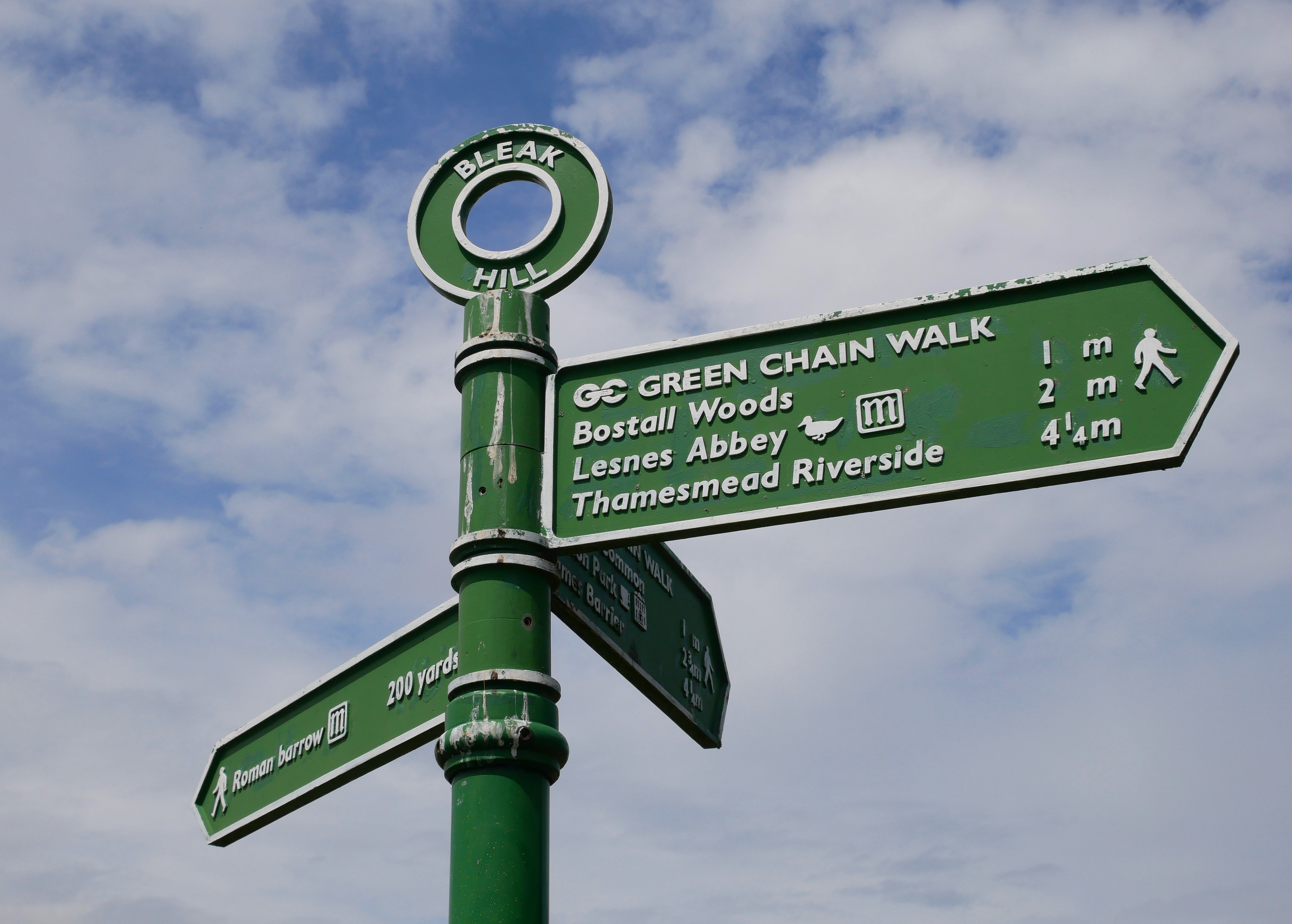
Signage for the Green Chain Walk on Winn's Common

Across Kings Highway there is a memorial to George Webb, the headmaster of Burrage Grove Boys School in 1896. Originally a drinking fountain, it has been filled in and its fittings removed. At the end of the second world war many prefabricated houses were placed on Winn's Common to try to alleviate the displaced from all over London. The prefabs came down in the late 1950s to be replaced by open ground and football pitches. An old hut at the North End of the common, adjacent to Kings Highway, served as the changing rooms with a tin trough and cold taps supplying the only washing facility.
