= Shirley Windmill =

Windmill in south London

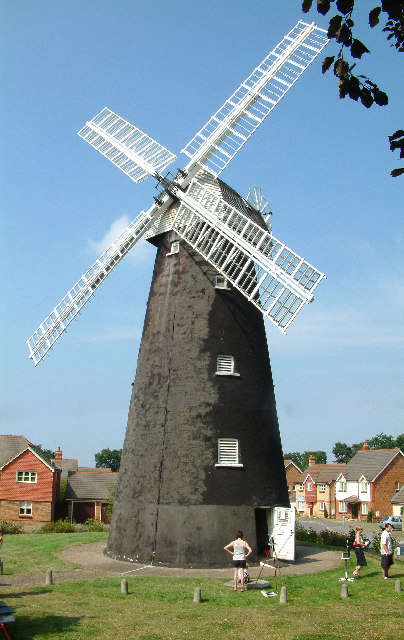
- Shirley Windmill

Origin
- Mill name: Shirley Windmill
- Mill location: Shirley, Croydon
- Grid reference: TQ 355 652
- Coordinates: 51.370°N 0.055°W
- Operator(s): Friends of Shirley Windmill
- Year built: 1854

Information
- Purpose: Corn mill
- Type: Tower mill
- Storeys: Five storeys
- No. of sails: Four sails
- Type of sails: Patent sails
- Windshaft: cast iron
- Winding: Fantail
- Fantail blades: Eight blades
- Auxiliary power: Engine
- No. of pairs of millstones: Two pairs

Shirley Windmill is a Grade II listed tower mill in Shirley, in the London Borough of Croydon, England which has been restored to working order.

== History ==
Shirley Windmill was built by Richard Alwen in 1854 to replace the former post mill destroyed by fire. The post mill had been built in 1809 by Richard Alwen (Sr) and passed to Alwen on the death of his father in 1846. The post mill burnt down in October 1854.

The mill is thought to have been brought from Stratford and re-erected. A date of 1740 on a beam in the windmill is evidence of re-use of materials from elsewhere. The mill cost £2,000 to build. More recent research has suggested that a post mill at West Ham, allegedly moved to Shirley c.1809, may have been the mill in question.

Richard Alwen died in 1884, and the mill was taken by Thomas Dives, grandson of Richard Alwen Sr. The mill was abandoned in 1892 as unviable by Alfred Rayson, at the time being only used for grinding animal feed. The windmill was struck by lightning in 1899. and again in April 1906, when a sail was set on fire, but the local fire brigade managed to save the mill. The mill was restored in 1927 and in 1935 one of the sails was blown off. The mill was again renovated, and a new Great Spur Wheel fitted by Messrs Lister Bros, of Woolwich. New sails were fitted by Thomas Hunt, the Soham millwright. There was a Court case following the renovations, in which it was stated the windmill was "almost in working order".

The windmill was listed in 1951. It was probably the last large windmill to be built in Surrey. In 1952 the mill and land were acquired by the Croydon Corporation. The mill was threatened with demolition when the new John Ruskin School was built but it was protected by its listed status and strong public interest. An inspection of the structure found that it was in generally good condition, but recommended that the first floor doorway be unblocked to allow better circulation of air to prevent rot. During excavations for the foundations of the new school, two trade tokens were found, relating to the smock mill at Appledore, Kent.

On 1 April 1971, the mill was advertised for sale in The Times as an April Fool's Day joke by pupils at the school. The headmaster received four telephone calls as a result of the prank. The school moved to a new site, and the school buildings were demolished. In August 1996, it was announced that the London Borough of Croydon was to receive a grant of £218,100 from the Heritage Lottery Fund to turn the mill into a museum. In September 2004, Croydon Borough Council agreed to fund external repairs to the windmill, the work being scheduled for the following spring.

In October 2008 it was reported that the sails of the mill were being damaged by rose-ringed parakeets. The birds had also damaged the spire of the nearby St John's Church. The sails were repaired at a cost of £45,000 by millwrights J Hole. Restoration was completed in May 2010.

== Description ==
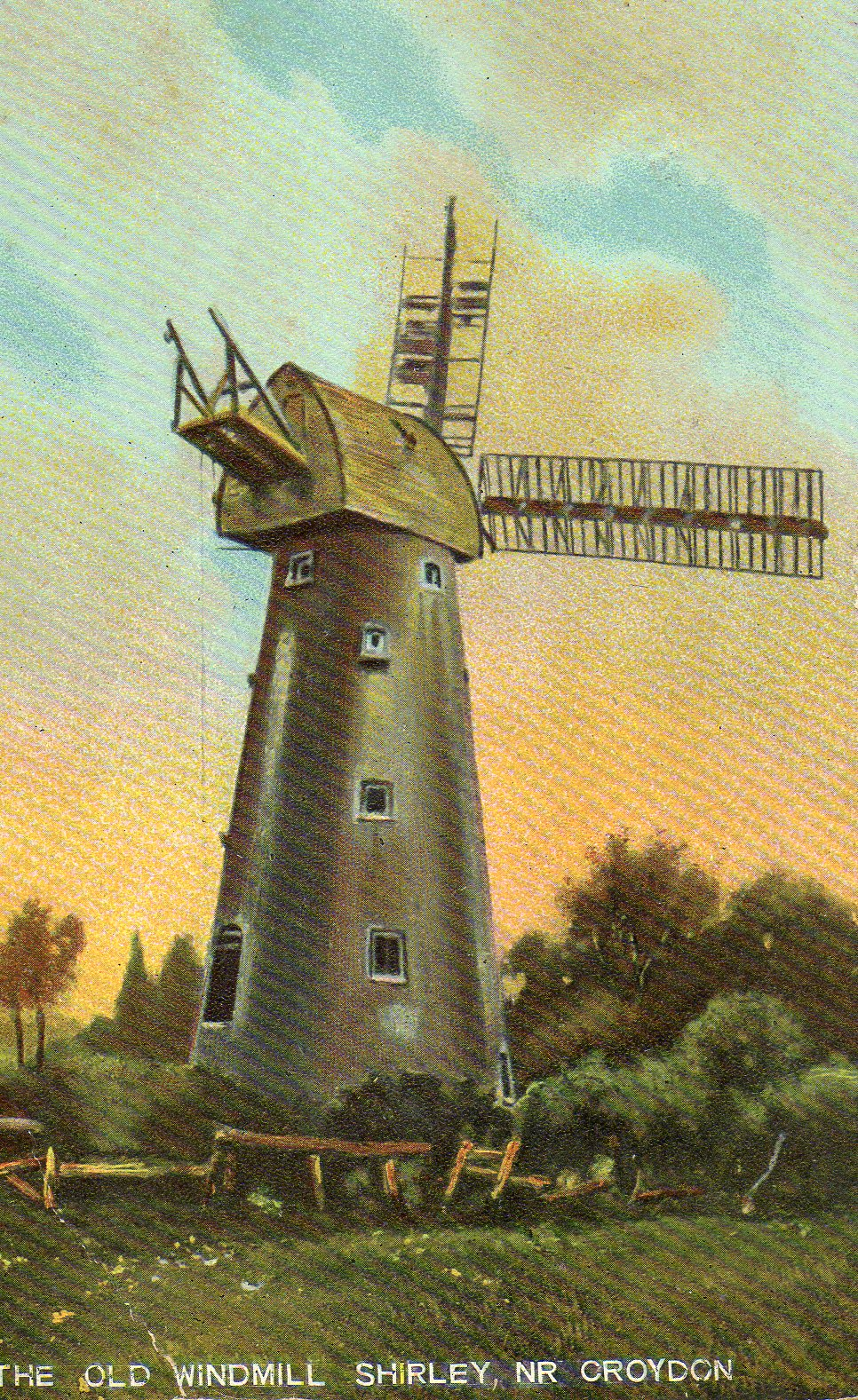
The mill c. 1910

Shirley Windmill is a five-storey brick tower mill. It has four double Patent sails carried on a cast-iron windshaft. The Kentish-style cap is winded by a fantail. The tower is 21 feet (6.40 m) diameter at the base and 11 feet (3.35 m) diameter at the curb. The mill is 55 feet (16.76 m) high to the top of the cap.

The iron Brake Wheel is 9 feet 3 inches (2.82 m) diameter and has 172 cogs. It drives an iron Wallower of 4 feet (1.22 m) diameter with 75 teeth. The cast iron Upright Shaft is 25 feet (7.62 m) long and has a dog clutch just below its midpoint, to allow the mill to be driven by engine without working the sails. The Great Spur Wheel is of iron, with wooden teeth, and drove two pairs of underdrift millstones.

== Millers ==
- Richard Alwen Sr 1809–1846 (post mill)
- Richard Alwen Jr 1846–1884 (post and tower)
- Thomas Dives 1884–
- Alfred Rayson – 1892

== Access ==
The windmill is open to the public on the first Sunday of each month from June to October, 1 pm to 5pm, with tours organised by The Friends of Shirley Windmill. It is also open on Heritage day and National Mills Day. On weekdays tours can be prearranged.
