= John Seller =

English cartographer (1632–1697)

John Seller (1632–1697) was an English cartographer. He worked as compiler, publisher, and seller of maps, charts, and geographical books. From 1671 he was hydrographer to the King.

== Early life ==
Seller, son of Henry Seller, a cordwainer, was baptized in London on 29 December 1632. In 1654 he became a freeman of the Merchant Taylors' Company, and he became a brother of the Clockmakers' Company in 1667. He was a compass maker, and continued this occupation throughout his career.

== His trial, and The English Pilot ==
Seller's subsequent career was affected by being put on trial in 1662, accused of high treason: it is thought he repeated a rumour about a plot involving a cache of arms. Those involved were executed, and although Seller was found guilty and imprisoned, he was later pardoned. In this way his name and occupation became known: the episode may have been a factor in his eventual appointment in March 1671 as hydrographer to the King.

In that year he published the first volume of charts and sailing directions, entitled The English Pilot. It was dedicated to the Duke of York, to whom he had appealed from prison. The trade in maritime maps and charts had until then been dominated by the Dutch, and, in many instances, earlier Dutch plates, from which the original title had been replaced by an English title, were used here. The English Pilot ran through many editions, until the end of the eighteenth century, new maps from time to time taking the place of the old.

== Later publications ==
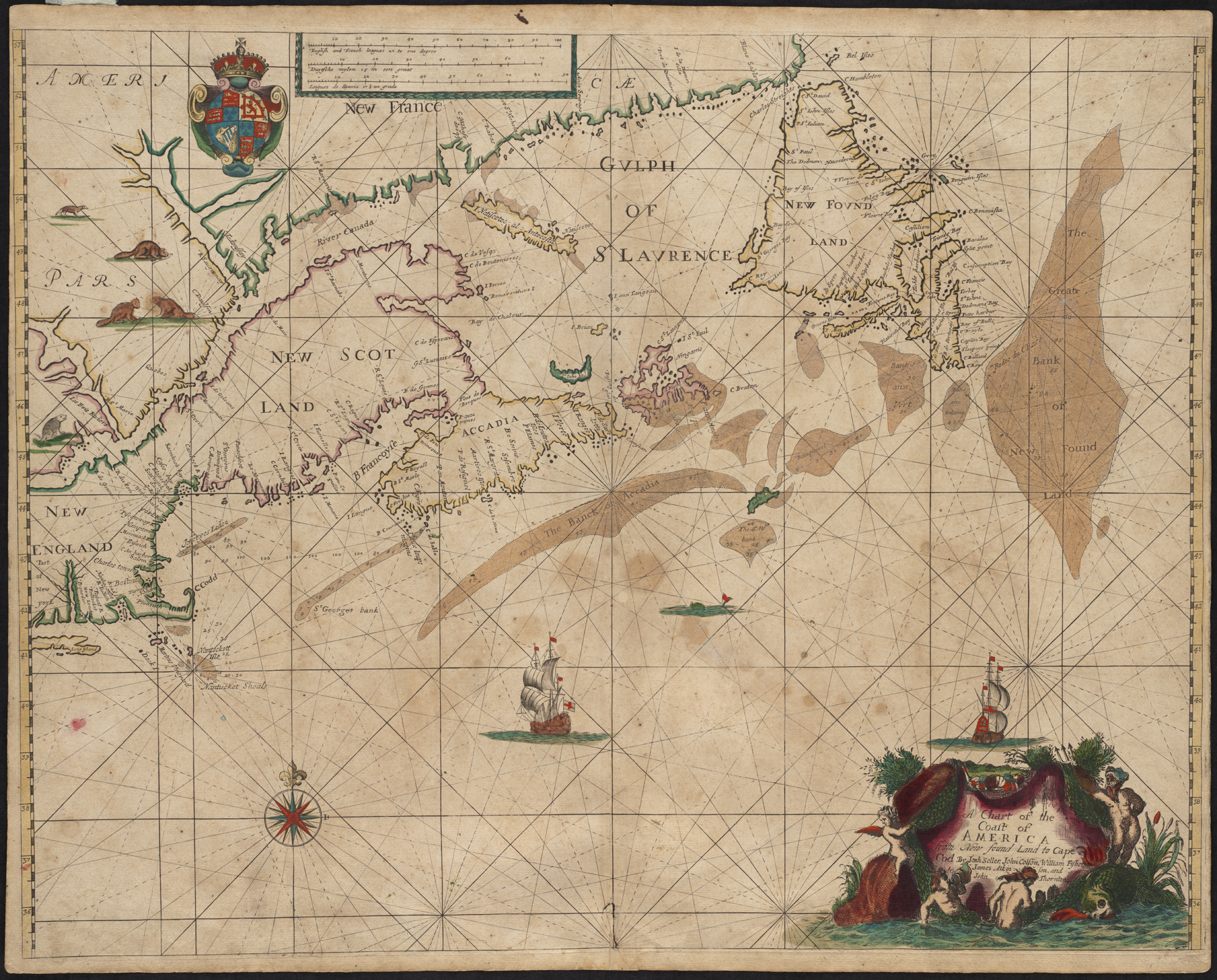
"A chart of the coast of America from New found Land to Cape Cod", from Atlas maritimus (1675)

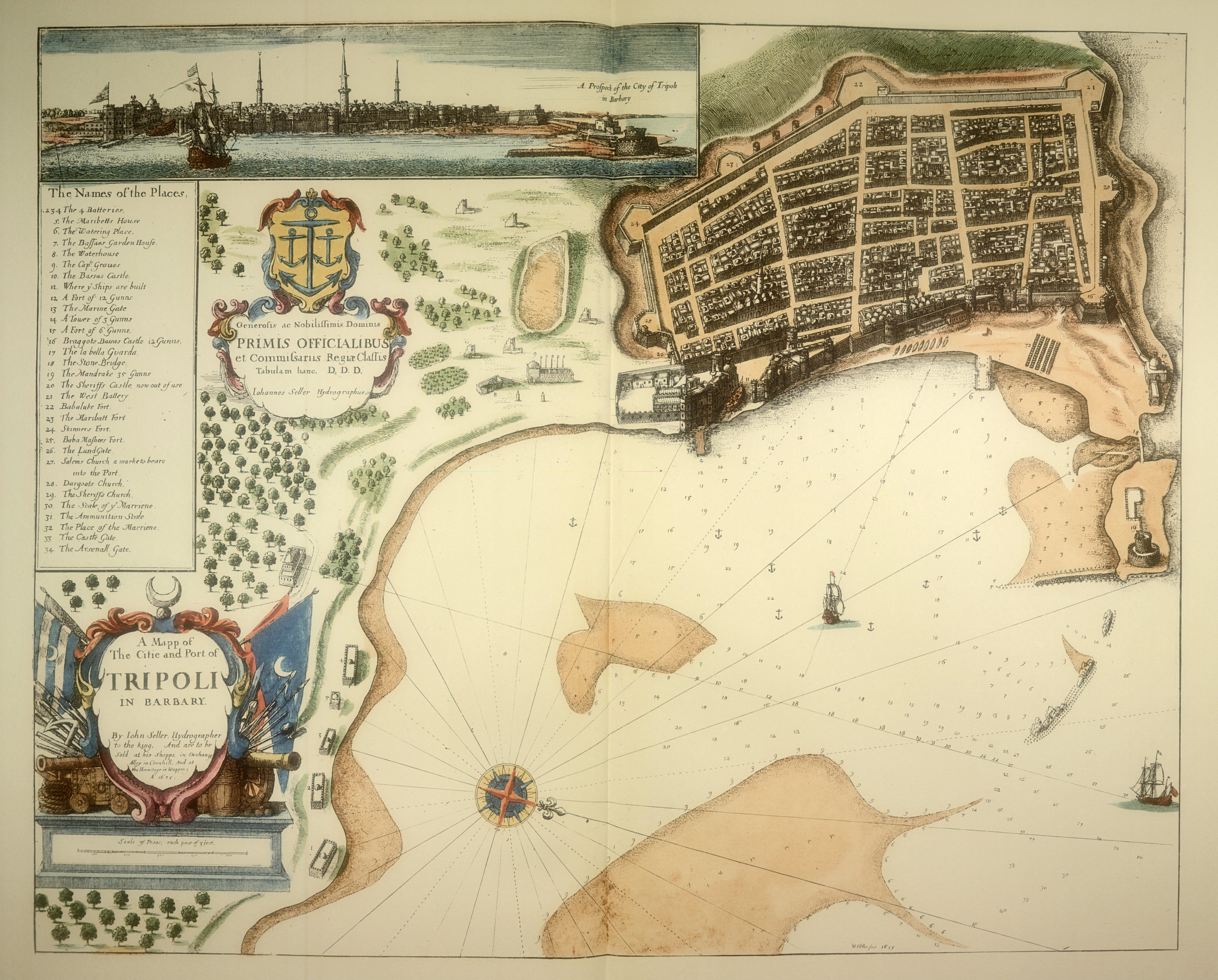
"A Mapp of the Citie and Port of Tripoli in Barbary" by Seller, 1675

The Coasting Pilot appeared in 1672, and Atlas maritimus in 1675. Atlas Anglicanus, a projected large-scale atlas of England and Wales, was not completed, although new surveys of six counties were published from 1675 to 1681, and a map of London by John Oliver, who was associated with the project. Atlas caelestis, the first British celestial atlas, appeared in 1680.

Seller wrote textbooks including Practical Navigation (1669), A Pocket Book containing several choice Collections in Arithmetic, Geometry, Surveying, Dialling, &c. (1677); and The Sea-Gunner, shewing the Practical Part of Gunnery as it is used at Sea (1691). He also produced nautical almanacs.

== Family ==
Seller was for many years settled in Wapping; he had also a shop in Exchange Alley, near the Royal Exchange. He and his wife Elizabeth had three daughters and two sons; John Seller, junior, had a shop in Cheapside, where his father's publications were on sale.

He died in May 1697, and was buried at St John's Church, Wapping.
