= Fowler's Mill =

Windmill in Battersea, London, England

Fowler's Mill, Battersea
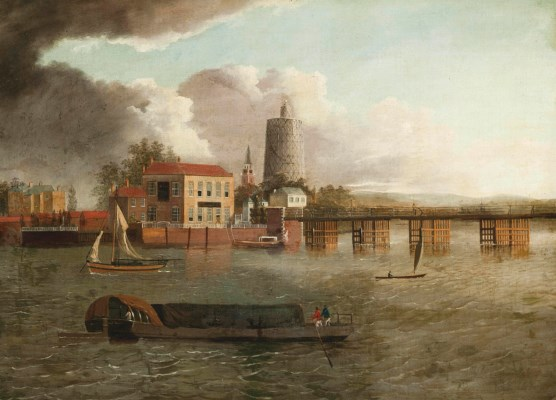
- Fowler's Mill in 1804

Origin
- Mill name: Fowler's Mill
- Grid reference: TQ 269 770
- Coordinates: 51.47817°N 0.17333°W
- Year built: 1788

Information
- Purpose: Corn mill
- Type: Horizontal windmill
- Base storeys: Two storeys
- Auxiliary power: Steam engine
- No. of pairs of millstones: Six pairs
- Year lost: Demolished 1825

Fowler's Mill was a horizontal windmill erected at Battersea, Surrey (now in London), England in 1788 and which ceased to work by wind c. 1825.

== History ==
Fowler's Mill was built in the grounds of the partly demolished Bolingbroke House in 1788 by Thomas Fowler to a design of Stephen Hooper. It worked by wind until 1825, when the windmill was dismantled, leaving the substructure, which was used for milling as late as 1882. Initially it was used to produce linseed oil, but was later used to grind malt for a distillery. The mill was supplemented by a steam engine, and Pitt the Younger is said to have shown great interest in the whole enterprise. The windmill was dismantled in 1825 as the cost of maintenance was too high. The building that the windmill was mounted on continued in use as a steam-powered mill until at least 1882.

== Description ==
Fowler's Mill had a three-storey base, which was 52 feet (15.85 m) diameter at the ground and 45 feet (13.72 m) diameter at the top of the 40 feet (12.19 m) high walls. The windmill was mounted on top of this structure, it was a twelve sided structure some 80 feet (24.38 m) tall, giving an overall height of some 120 feet (36.58 m) overall. There were ninety-six sails (called floats), with the same number of shutters in the mill body which could be opened or closed to allow a flow of air through one half of the diameter of the structure. The mill drove six pairs of millstones. In height, it compared well with Southtown Windmill, Great Yarmouth, which was one of the tallest windmills in England at 102 feet (31.09 m) in height.

== Millers ==
- Hodgson & Co.
- Dives
