= Plumstead Common Windmill =

Windmill in London, England

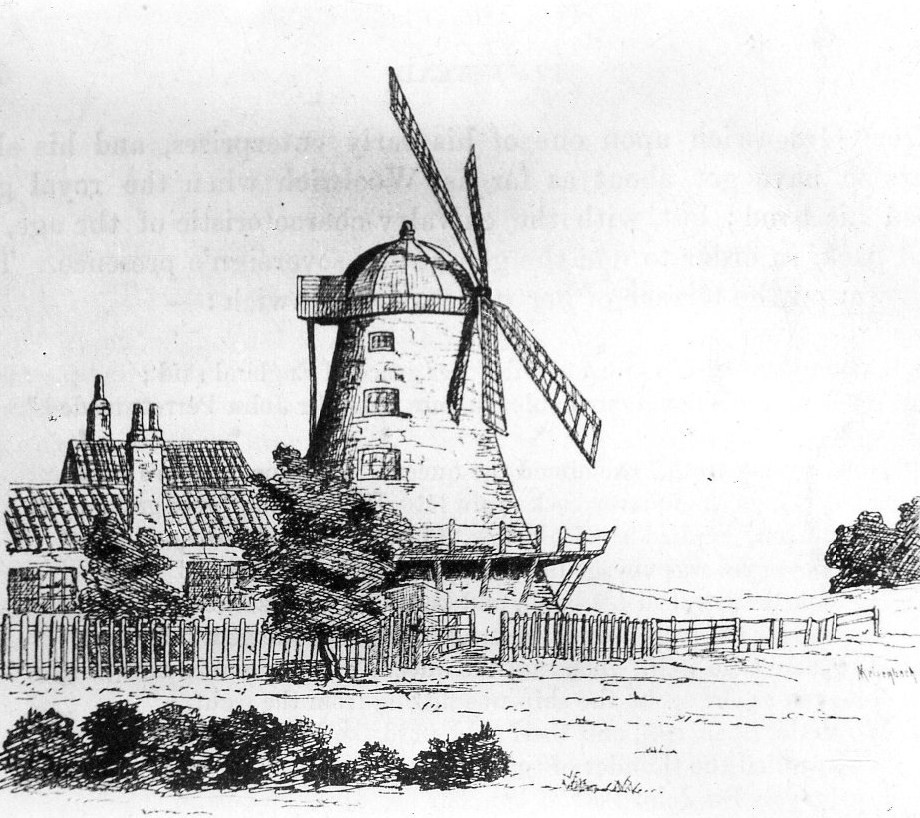
- Drawing dated 1820
- Interactive map of Plumstead Common Windmill

Origin
- Grid reference: TQ 4480 7791
- Coordinates: 51.4817°N 0.0840°E
- Year built: Early nineteenth century

Information
- Purpose: Corn mill
- Type: Tower mill
- Storeys: Four storeys
- No. of sails: Four
- Type of sails: Common sails
- Winding: Hand winded

Plumstead Common Windmill is a tower mill in Plumstead Common, in the Royal Borough of Greenwich, in south London.

== History ==
Plumstead Common Windmill was marked on the 1819-43 Ordnance Survey map. In 1827, there was an accident at the mill when so many people crowded onto the stage to watch a sham fight that it gave way, injuring a number of them. In 1848, the mill was converted into a brewhouse, having been disused for a number of years previously. The tower remains today, as part of the Old Mill pub.

== Description ==
Plumstead Common Mill has a four-storey brick tower. It had four common sails. There was a stage at first floor level. The mill had a domed cap and was winded by hand.

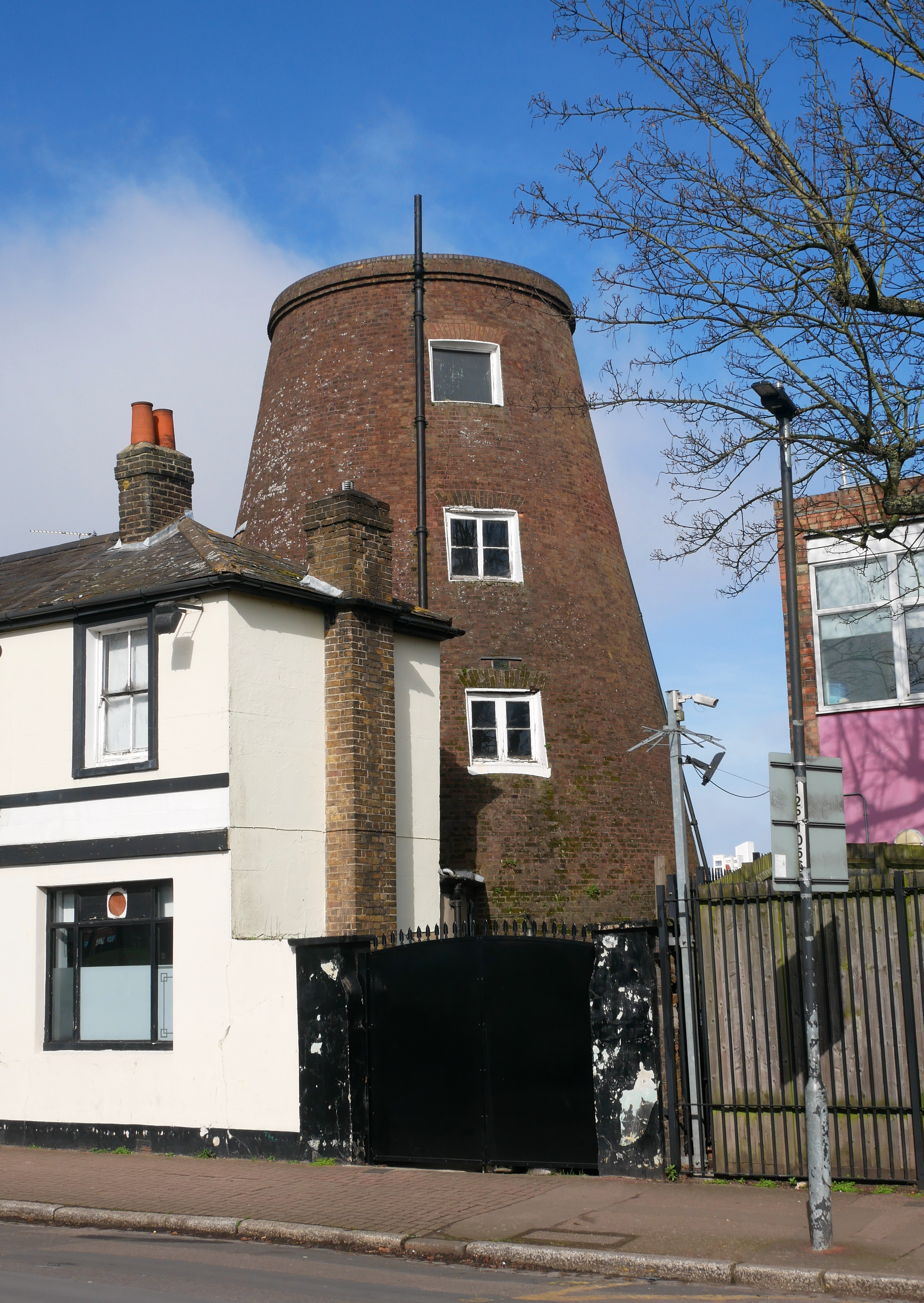
The surviving structure

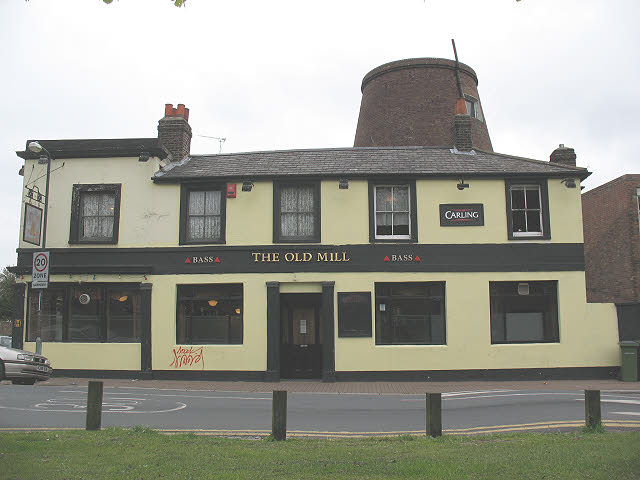
The old mill today

== Millers ==
- Longmore 1827
- Clements
