= Wellington Mill, Barking =

Windmill in Barking, Greater London, England

Barking Windmill
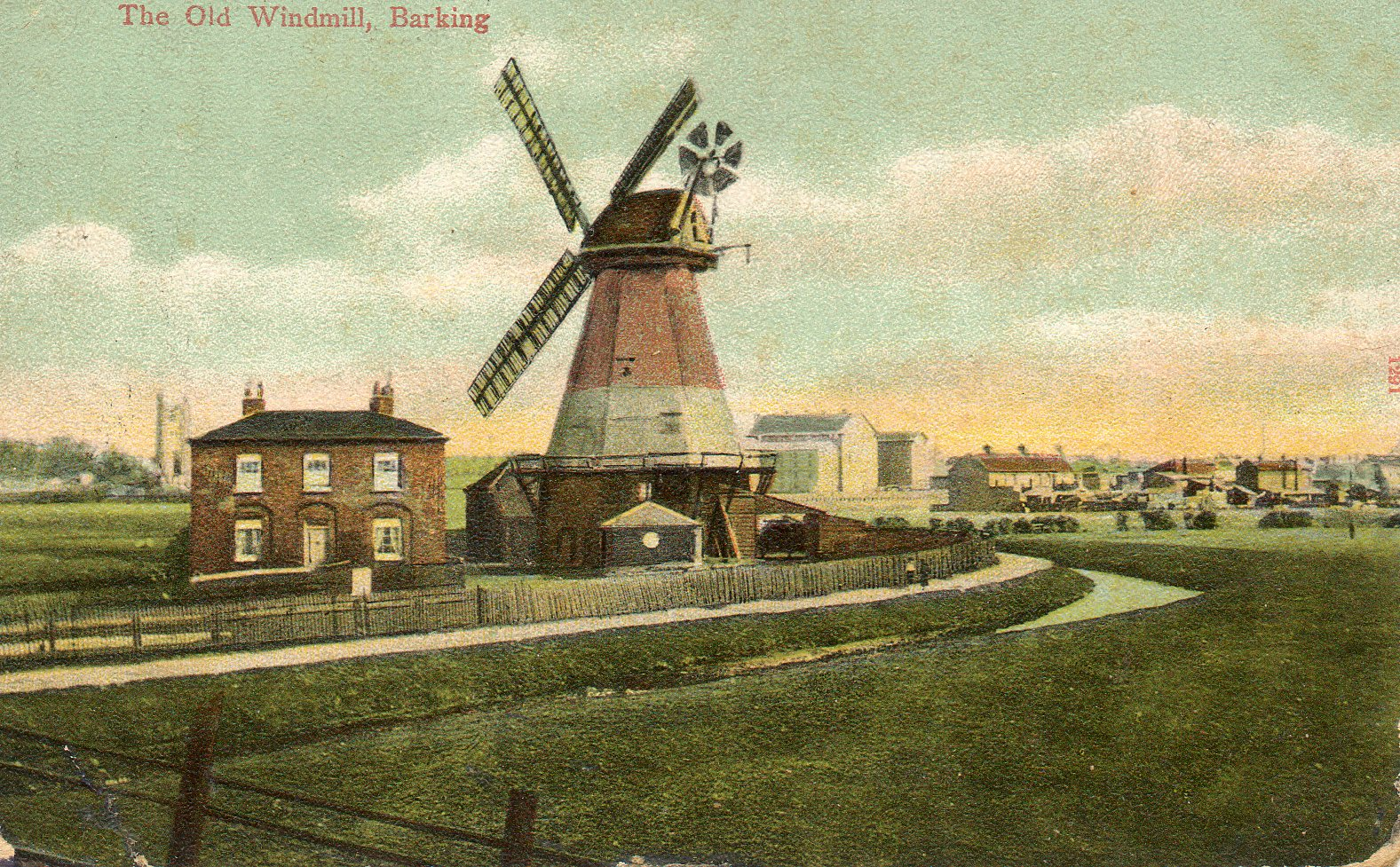
- The mill c1907

Origin
- Mill name: Wellington Mill
- Grid reference: TQ 436 839
- Coordinates: 51.536182°N 0.069787°E
- Year built: 1815

Information
- Purpose: Corn mill
- Type: Smock mill
- Storeys: Four storey smock
- Base storeys: Two storey base
- Smock sides: Eight sides
- No. of sails: Four sails
- Type of sails: Patent sails
- Winding: Fantail
- Fantail blades: Six blades
- Year lost: 1926

Wellington Windmill was a weather boarded smock windmill which stood near to what is now Dukes Court, Barking, in the London Borough of Barking and Dagenham (then a part of Essex).

The mill was built in 1815 to assist with work at the nearby mill at Marks Gate. It was named in celebration of his victory at the Battle of Waterloo. In the later 19th century, it was occupied by Francis Whitbourne. The Firman family later occupied the mill; and converted it to electric power in 1906. It remained in use until 1926.
