= Barnes Cray =

Coordinates: 51.4578°N 0.1960°E

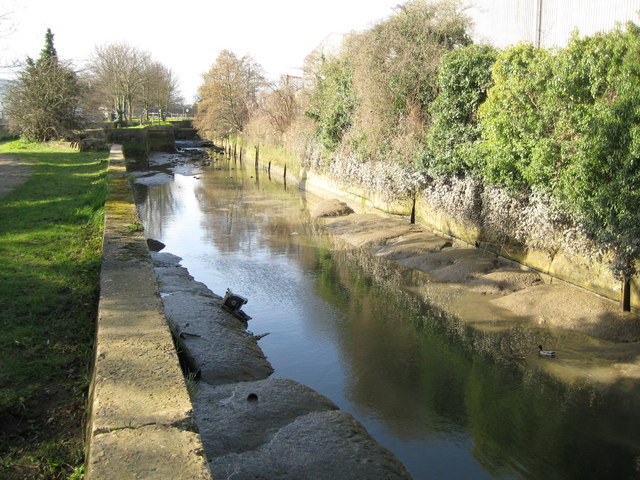
- River Cray in Barnes Cray

- Location within Greater London
- OS grid reference: TQ525755
- London borough: Bexley
- Ceremonial county: Greater London
- Region: London
- Country: England
- Sovereign state: United Kingdom
- Post town: DARTFORD
- Postcode district: DA1
- Dialling code: 01322
- Police: Metropolitan
- Fire: London
- Ambulance: London
- UK Parliament: Bexleyheath and Crayford
- London Assembly: Bexley and Bromley

Barnes Cray is a residential area in eastern Crayford in the London Borough of Bexley. It is located west of the border of Greater London and Dartford borough, Kent.

== History ==
Prior to the Victorian era, Barnes Cray was a hamlet on the river Cray where no more than sixteen homes were clustered. It remained independent from Crayford, a nearby parish with 2,000 people located a kilometre upstream. A calico-printing works drew water power from the culverted river Wansunt in early Victorian times, being later adapted for the manufacture of rubber goods, then felt, and finally Brussels carpets. This carpet mill was demolished by 1890 and Barnes Cray House, the next largest building, was cleared by 1933, ending its days as a nursing home.

Crayford expanded to become a munition village for the expansion of Vickers' armaments factory, located around modern day Crayford Town Hall, from 1915 to 1919 and absorbed the remnants of Barnes Cray. Because of this, the area was transferred from the Dartford Rural District to the Crayford Urban District in 1920, both within Kent. Following the first World War, Crayford Urban District Council erected further housing estates to the north, eventually merging with estates spreading southwards from Erith. In 1965, under the London Government Act 1963, the urban district was abolished and its area transferred to Greater London to form part of the present-day London Borough of Bexley.

== Leisure and entertainment ==
The Geoffrey Whitworth Theatre is in Barnes Cray.

There are two schools in the area, both sponsored by the Worshipful Company of Haberdashers, a London livery company, and part of Haberdashers' Academies Trust South. Both were built on the old site of Barnes Cray Primary School and opened in 2009:

- Haberdashers' Crayford Academy is a secondary and Sixth form
- Haberdashers' Crayford Primary Temple Grove is a primary school.

== Transport ==
Barnes Cray is served by the Transport for London bus service 428 to Erith via Slade Green and to Bluewater via Dartford. The nearest rail link to the area is at Crayford station.

== Nearest places ==
- Crayford
- Slade Green
- Dartford
- Barnehurst
- North End
