= Edward Alfred Cowper =

British mechanical engineer

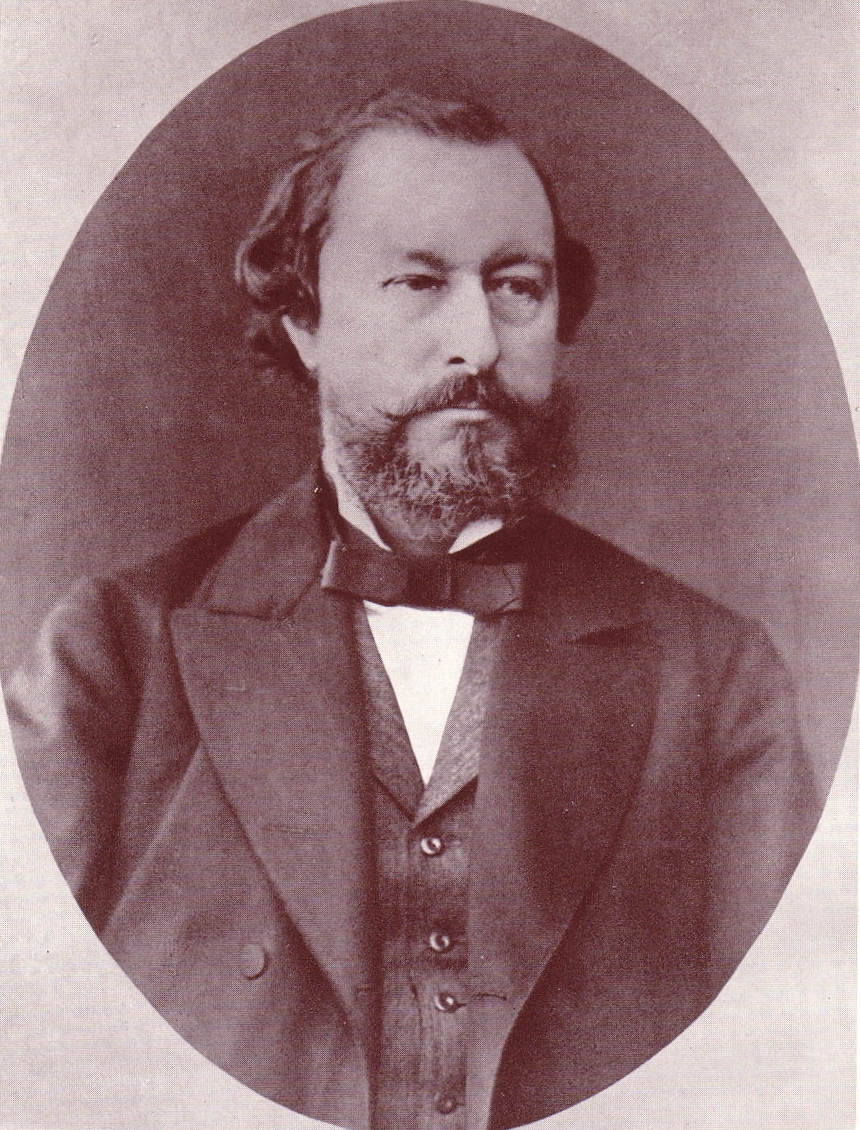
- Born: 10 December 1819; London, England
- Died: 9 May 1893 (aged 73); Rastricke, Weybridge, Surrey
- Occupations: Mechanical engineer, inventor.
- Employer(s): Fox, Henderson and Co, Institution of Mechanical Engineers.
- Known for: Detonating railway fog signal Birmingham New Street station Cowper stove
- Awards: Elliott Cresson Medal (1889)

Edward Alfred Cowper (10 December 1819 London – 9 May 1893 Rastricke, Weybridge, Surrey) was a British mechanical engineer.

== Biography ==
He was born on 10 December 1819 in London to professor Edward Shickle Cowper (1790–1852), head of the department of engineering at King's College London; and Ann Applegath. The elder Cowper, together with his brother-in-law Augustus Applegath, had helped to develop the vertical printing press in the 1820s.

In 1833, he was apprenticed to John Braithwaite, a railway engineer in London.

In around 1841, he invented the detonating railway fog signal, first tried on the Croydon railway and widely used to this day as an emergency safety measure. The same year, he joined Fox, Henderson and Co, structural and railway engineers in Smethwick, where he devised a method of casting railway chairs. He oversaw the company's contract drawings for the 1851 Exhibition Building, The Crystal Palace.

Cowper also designed the wrought-iron and glass roof of Birmingham New Street station, which was then the largest single-span roof in the world at 211 feet (64.31m) wide. It was originally intended to have three spans, supported by columns, however it was soon realised that the supporting columns would severely restrict the workings of the railway. Cowper's single-span design, was therefore adopted, even though it was some 62 feet (19 metres) wider than the widest roof span at that time. George Gilbert Scott praised Cowper's roof at New Street, stating "An iron roof in its most normal condition is too spider-like a structure to be handsome, but with a very little attention this defect is obviated. The most wonderful specimen, probably, is that at the great Birmingham Station . . . "

At the end of 1851, Cowper resigned his post at Fox and Henderson and commenced to practise on his own account in London as a consulting engineer. In 1857, he invented the regenerative hot blast stove known as the Cowper stove, which greatly improved the economy of the hot blast process in the making of steel. In 1868, he invented a wire-spoke wheel with rubber tyre, which is the same as the modern bicycle wheel. He however never patented his design.

In 1879, Cowper invented the writing-telegraph; a device which allowed hand-written messages to be transmitted by telegraph. The exact position of the pencil of the operator at the sending-station was communicated to the writing-pen at the receiving-station through two wires, one giving the vertical and the other the horizontal position of the pencil.

Cowper also took part in founding the Institution of Mechanical Engineers. He was a founding member of the Institution in 1847 and in the following year was elected a member of the council. In 1880-81 he served the office of President.

Cowper was awarded the Elliott Cresson Medal of The Franklin Institute in 1889.

He married Juliana Hanson in 1847 in Kensington, London and they had six children, the youngest being the actor and singer Vernon Cowper (1871-1922). He died at home of pneumonia at the age of 73.

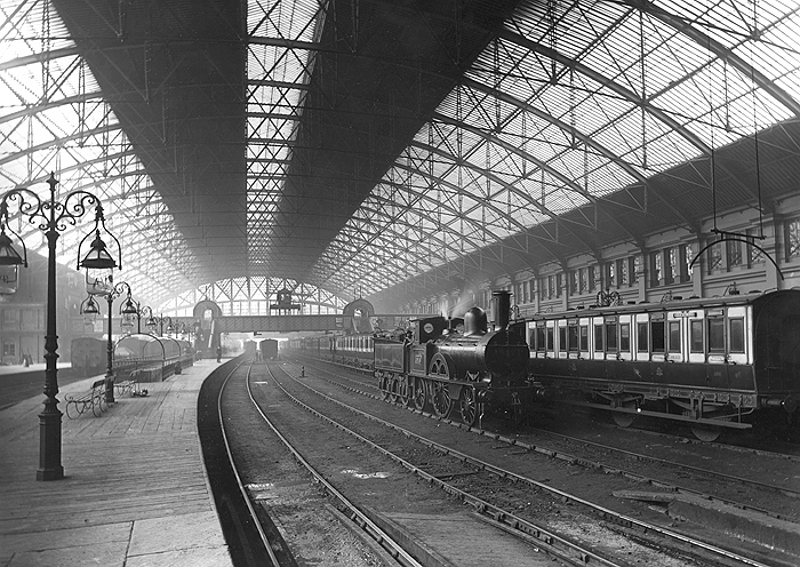
Cowper's roof at New Street Station.

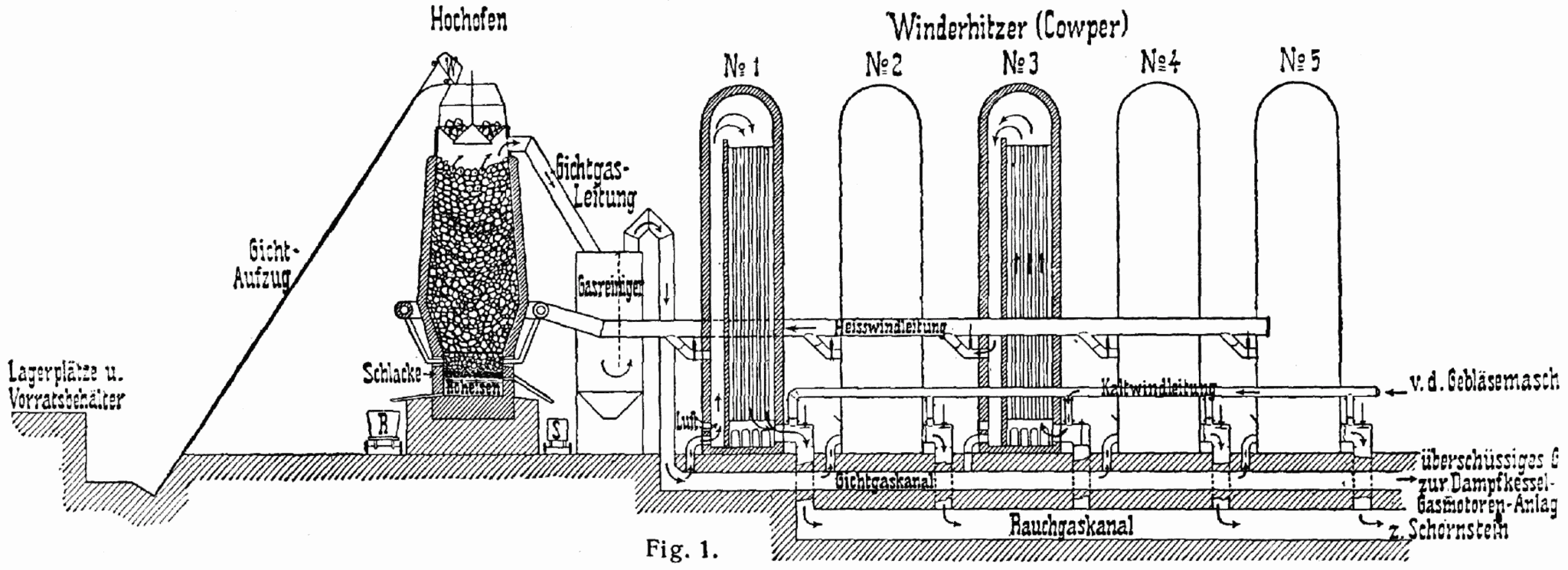
Five Cowper's stove regenerative heat exchangers

Professional and academic associations
Preceded by John Robinson	President of the Institution of Mechanical Engineers; 1880-1881	Succeeded by Percy G. B. Westmacott
