= Barnehurst =

Town in Greater London, England

Coordinates: 51.4613°N 0.1690°E

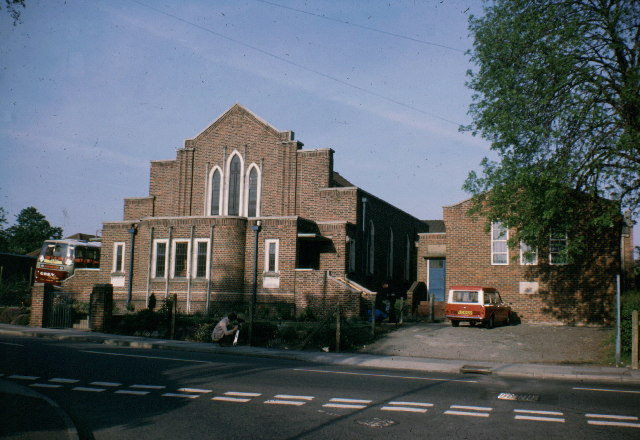
- Barnehurst Methodist Church

- Location within Greater London
- Population: 10,418 (2011 Census. Ward)
- OS grid reference: TQ505755
- London borough: Bexley
- Ceremonial county: Greater London
- Region: London
- Country: England
- Sovereign state: United Kingdom
- Post town: BEXLEYHEATH
- Postcode district: DA7
- Dialling code: 01322
- Police: Metropolitan
- Fire: London
- Ambulance: London
- UK Parliament: Bexleyheath and Crayford
- London Assembly: Bexley and Bromley

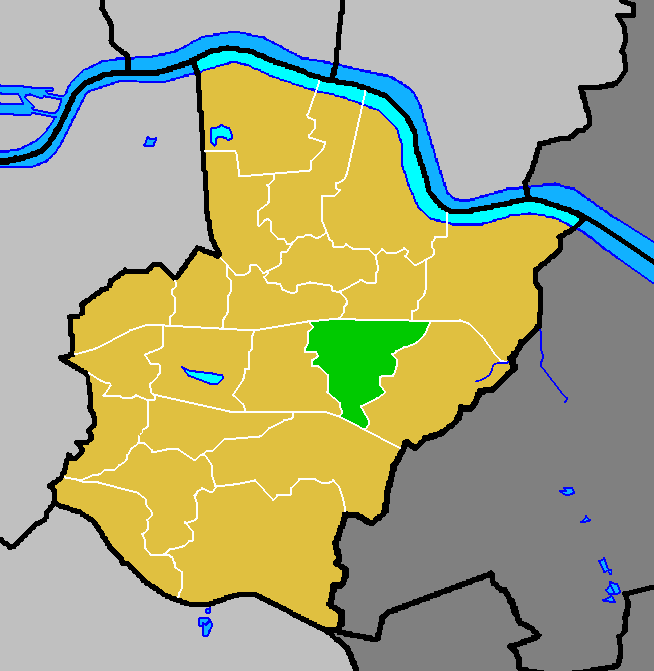
Barnehurst ward (green) within the London Borough of Bexley (yellow)

Barnehurst is a town in Greater London within the London Borough of Bexley. It lies north east of Bexleyheath, and 13.0 miles (20 km) east south-east of Charing Cross. It is separated from North Bexleyheath by the A220, Erith Road.

== History ==
The town came into being after the sale of land in 1881 to build the Bexleyheath loop line between Lewisham and Dartford.

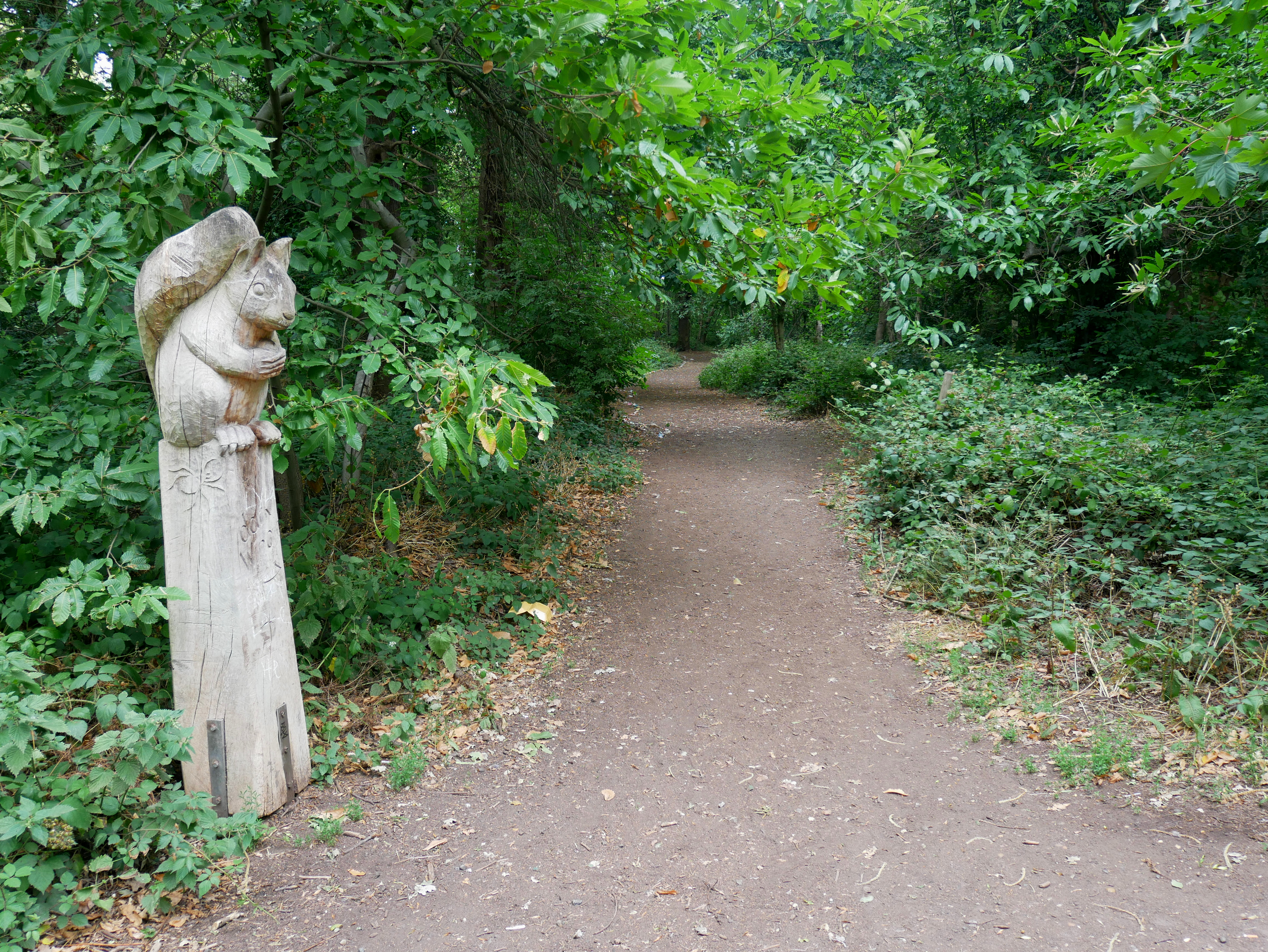
A path through Bursted Wood in Barnehurst

Barnehurst's name originates from the name of the railway station, which was so-named after Colonel Barne, who owned a local property, May Place House (and was vice-chairman of the railway company).

As in much of suburban London, Barnehurst railway station was opened to encourage building of houses. The Barnehurst Estate was built in 1926 and other building, mainly by W.H. Wedlock followed in the years after. A key landmark, just west of the station, is the Red Barn pub, a venue important to the survival of jazz in Britain immediately following the Second World War, largely due to the enthusiasm of pianist George Webb.

In 1920 the area became part of the Crayford Urban District of Kent. In 1965, under the London Government Act 1963, the urban district was abolished and its area transferred to Greater London to form part of the present-day London Borough of Bexley.

== Politics ==
Most of Barnehurst is in the Barnehurst electoral ward of the London Borough of Bexley. Two elected councillors represent the ward on the borough council. The northernmost part of Barnehurst is in Colyers ward and part of one road, Eversley Avenue, lies within North End ward.

== Sport and leisure ==
Barnehurst has a non-League football club Phoenix Sports F.C., which plays at Phoenix Sports Ground.

== Notable people ==
- Boy George, lead singer with Culture Club was born here
- Wes Hunter, guitarist with Sounds Incorporated lived here

== Transport and locale ==
=== Nearest places ===
- Bexleyheath
- Crayford
- Northumberland Heath
- Slade Green
- Barnes Cray

=== Rail ===
Barnehurst station serves the area, with Southeastern services to London Victoria, London Charing Cross, London Cannon Street and Dartford.

=== Buses ===
Several bus routes serve the area, all provided by Transport for London. These connect Barnehurst with areas including Bexleyheath, Blackheath, Erith, Lewisham, Sidcup, Thamesmead, Welling and Woolwich.

=== Religious sites ===
- Saint Martin's, The parish church of Barnehurst
- Barnehurst Methodist Church
- Lyndhurst Chapel
- Selah Independent Baptist Church
