= St Augustine's Church, Slade Green =

Parish church in South East London

Coordinates: 51.4719°N 0.1888°E

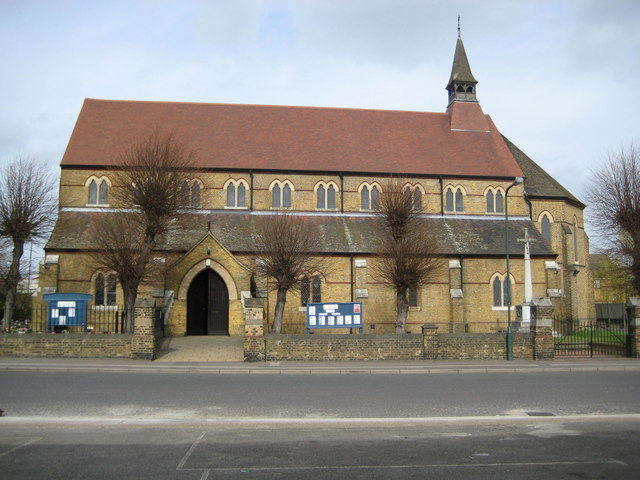
St Augustine's Church, Slade Green, seen from the south in 2008

St Augustine's Church is a Victorian Church of England parish church in Slade Green, in the Diocese of Rochester.

Established in 1900 as a daughter of the Church of St Paulinus in Crayford, St Augustine's became its own parish in 1925. The church is dedicated to the patron saint Augustine of Canterbury. A prominent war memorial has stood at the front of the church since at least 1930.

St Augustine's was subject to air raids during both World Wars. The church harbored families from the east of London that had been 'bombed out' during the Second World War. The local community was supported during the war by a British Restaurant operating from St. Augustine's Church Hall, which supplied up to 250 lunches six days a week to residents, the school, and nearby factories. Substantial rebuilding work was required following a direct hit during an air raid in 1944, and following a fire in 1991 which destroyed the roof and much of the internal fabric.
