= William Clowes =

William Clowes may refer to:

- William Clowes (Primitive Methodist) (1780–1851), Englishman who was one of the founders of Primitive Methodism
- William Clowes (printer) (1779–1847), founded the printing firm William Clowes Ltd.
- William Laird Clowes (1856–1905), British journalist and historian
- William Clowes (surgeon) (1540–1604), English surgeon and author
