= Haberdashers' Aske's School =

Haberdashers' Aske's School may refer to:

- Haberdashers' Aske's Boys' School, Elstree, Hertfordshire
- Haberdashers' Aske's School for Girls, Elstree, Hertfordshire

It may also refer to:

- Haberdashers' Knights Academy, Downham, London Borough of Lewisham
- Haberdashers' Hatcham College, New Cross, London Borough of Lewisham
- Haberdashers' Crayford Academy, Crayford, London Borough of Bexley

== See also ==
- Worshipful Company of Haberdashers § List of Haberdasher schools
