= Bexley Riverside =

Coordinates: 51.47°N 0.17°E

Bexley Riverside is an opportunity area defined by the London Plan for potential development, in the Thames Gateway region of South East London. The four constituent towns of the area are Belvedere, Erith, Slade Green and Crayford.

== History ==
Slade Green Depot (from 1899) and A206 (from 1922) have provided strategically important contributions to London's logistics capability.

== Future ==
The London Plan considers the area to have good transport access with linkages to Europe and notes that the residential areas require environmental improvement, with town centres having scope for intensification, and renewal. There are safeguarded wharfs in Erith, and future development plans include inter-modal freight transfer facilities.

The Bexley Riverside Opportunity Area contributes significantly to the London Borough of Bexley growth strategy. Statements made in 2017 describe the intention to deliver 16,500 new homes and 7,500 new jobs across all four towns. The Greater London Authority requires a minimum of 4,000 new homes and indicates employment capacity is 7,000.
