= Colyers (ward) =

Coordinates: 51.47110°N 0.17320°E

- Former electoral ward for the Bexley London Borough Council
- Colyers ward boundaries
- Borough: Bexley
- County: Greater London
- Population: 11,128 (2011)

Former electoral ward
- Created: 2002
- Abolished: 2018
- Councillors: 3
- GSS code: E05000070

Colyers was an electoral ward in the London Borough of Bexley from 2002 to 2018. It returned three councillors to Bexley London Borough Council.

== List of councillors ==
Term	Councillor	Party
2002–2006	Ronald Browning	Labour
2002–2006	Denis Daniels	Labour
2002–2006	Joga Minhas	Labour
2006–2010	Christopher Brockwell	Conservative
2006–2010	David Cammish	Conservative
2006–2010	David Hurt	Conservative
2010–2018	Brian Bishop	Conservative
2010–2018	Maxine Fothergill	Conservative
2010–2014	Chris Taylor	Conservative
2014–2018	Mac Mcgannon	UKIP

== Bexley council elections ==
Colyers ward consisted of parts of Barnehurst, Erith and Northumberland Heath. The ward covered Colyers Lane, a local main road that is 1.5 km (0.93 mi) long east to west, and the surrounding area. Northend Road, part of the A206 road passes the east side of Colyers travelling, north to south it forms some of the ward's eastern boundary. The A220 road passes north to south on the western side of Colyers and forms some of the western boundary; it is named Bexley Road to the north and Erith Road to the south. The ward's southern boundary follows some of the railway line east of Barnehurst railway station on the Bexleyheath Line. The population of the ward at the 2011 Census was 11,128.

=== 2014 election ===
The election took place on 22 May 2014.

2014 Bexley London Borough Council election: Colyers
Party	Candidate	Votes	%	±%

=== 2010 election ===
The election on 6 May 2010 took place on the same day as the United Kingdom general election.

2010 Bexley London Borough Council election: Colyers
Party	Candidate	Votes	%	±%
Conservative	Brian Bishop	2,006	37.3	
Conservative	Maxine Fothergill	2,003		
Conservative	Chris Taylor	1,925		
Labour	Tom Page	1,574	29.2	
Labour	Baljeet Singh Gill	1,549		
Labour	Tosin Okuyele	1,446		
Liberal Democrats	Barry Standen	734	13.6	
Liberal Democrats	Alex MacDonald	697		
BNP	Peter Hacking	666	12.4	
Liberal Democrats	Jawharah Albakri	596		
English Democrat	Mike Tibby	403	7.5	
Turnout			56.0	
Conservative hold		Swing		
Conservative hold		Swing		
Conservative hold		Swing		

=== 2006 election ===
The election took place on 4 May 2006.

2006 Bexley London Borough Council election: Colyers
Party	Candidate	Votes	%	±%
Conservative	Christopher Brockwell	1,506	44.7	
Conservative	David Cammish	1,415		
Conservative	David Hurt	1,349		
Labour	Ronald Browning	1,175	34.9	
Labour	Patricia Ball	1,165		
Labour	Peter Kilner	1,163		
Independent	Sally Briant	397	11.8	
Independent	Dianne Joyce	387		
Independent	Joanne Wilfort	321		
Liberal Democrats	Angela Thick	293	8.7	
Turnout			40.5	
Conservative gain from Labour		Swing		
Conservative gain from Labour		Swing		
Conservative gain from Labour		Swing		

=== 2002 election ===
The election took place on 2 May 2002.

2002 Bexley London Borough Council election: Colyers
Party	Candidate	Votes	%	±%
Labour	Ronald Browning	1,127	46.5	
Labour	Denis Daniels	1,036		
Labour	Joga Minhas	1,005		
Conservative	John Bowes	952	39.3	
Conservative	Joseph Pollard	908		
Conservative	Gerald Quieros	857		
BNP	Lawrence Rustem	184	7.6	
UKIP	Bernard Rainsbury	160	6.6	
Turnout			29.0	
Labour win (new seat)				
Labour win (new seat)				
Labour win (new seat)				
