= Detonator (railway) =

Signaling system for trains

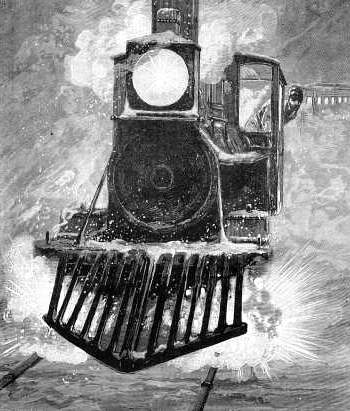
This illustration from an 1882 Leslie's Monthly portrays an engineer (fireman) finding a torpedo on the track.

A railway detonator, (torpedo in North America) or fog signal is a coin-sized device that is used as a loud warning signal to train drivers. It is placed on the top of the rail, usually secured with two lead straps, one on each side. When the wheel of the train passes over, it explodes, emitting a loud bang. It was invented in 1841 by English inventor Edward Alfred Cowper.

== Uses ==
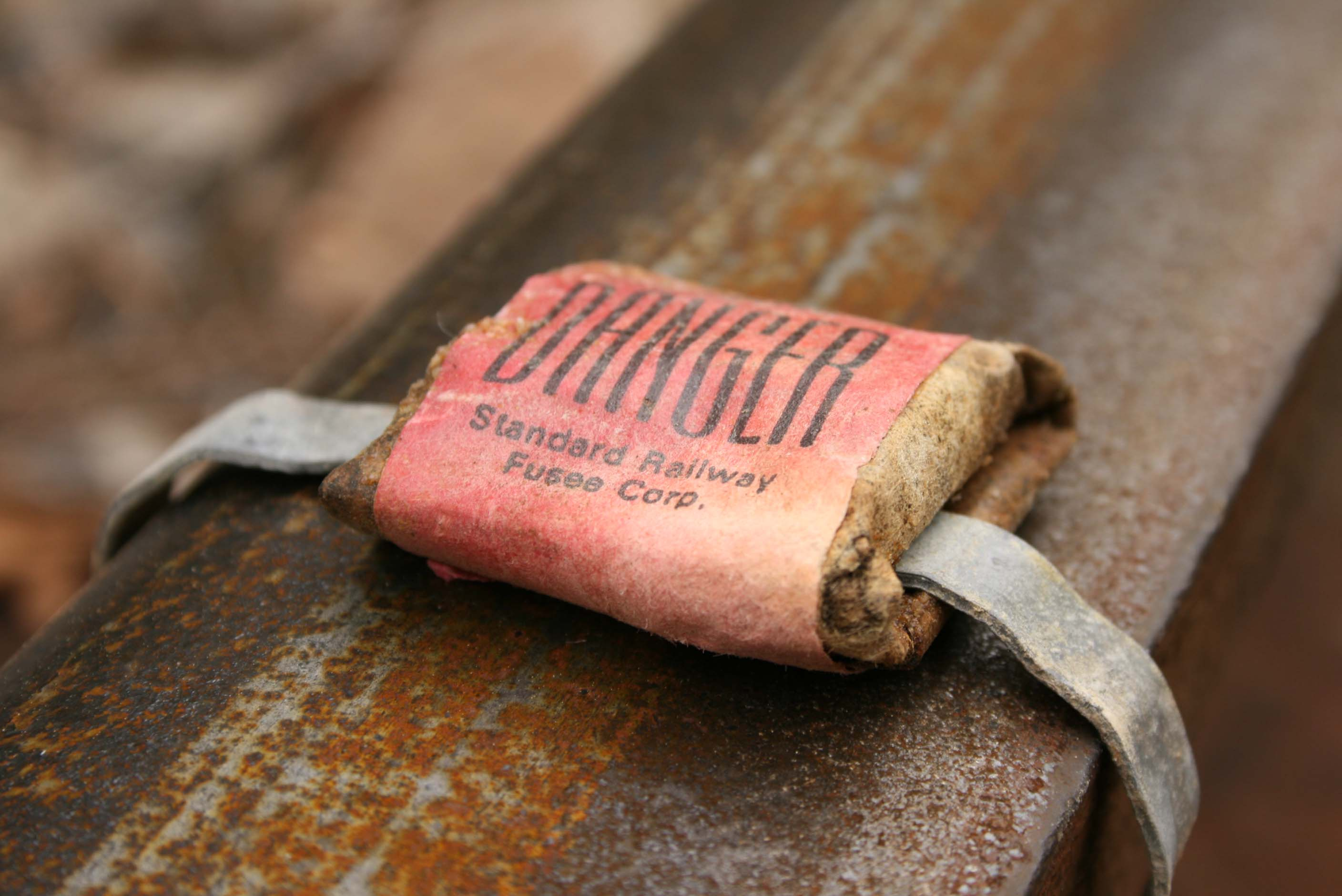
A torpedo on a rail

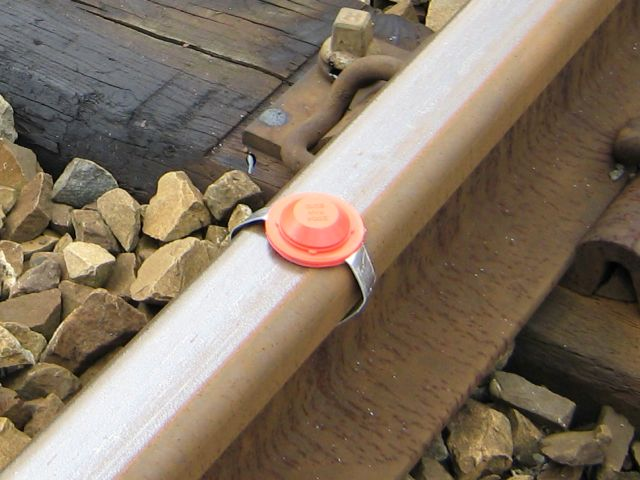
A detonator on a railway line in Belgium

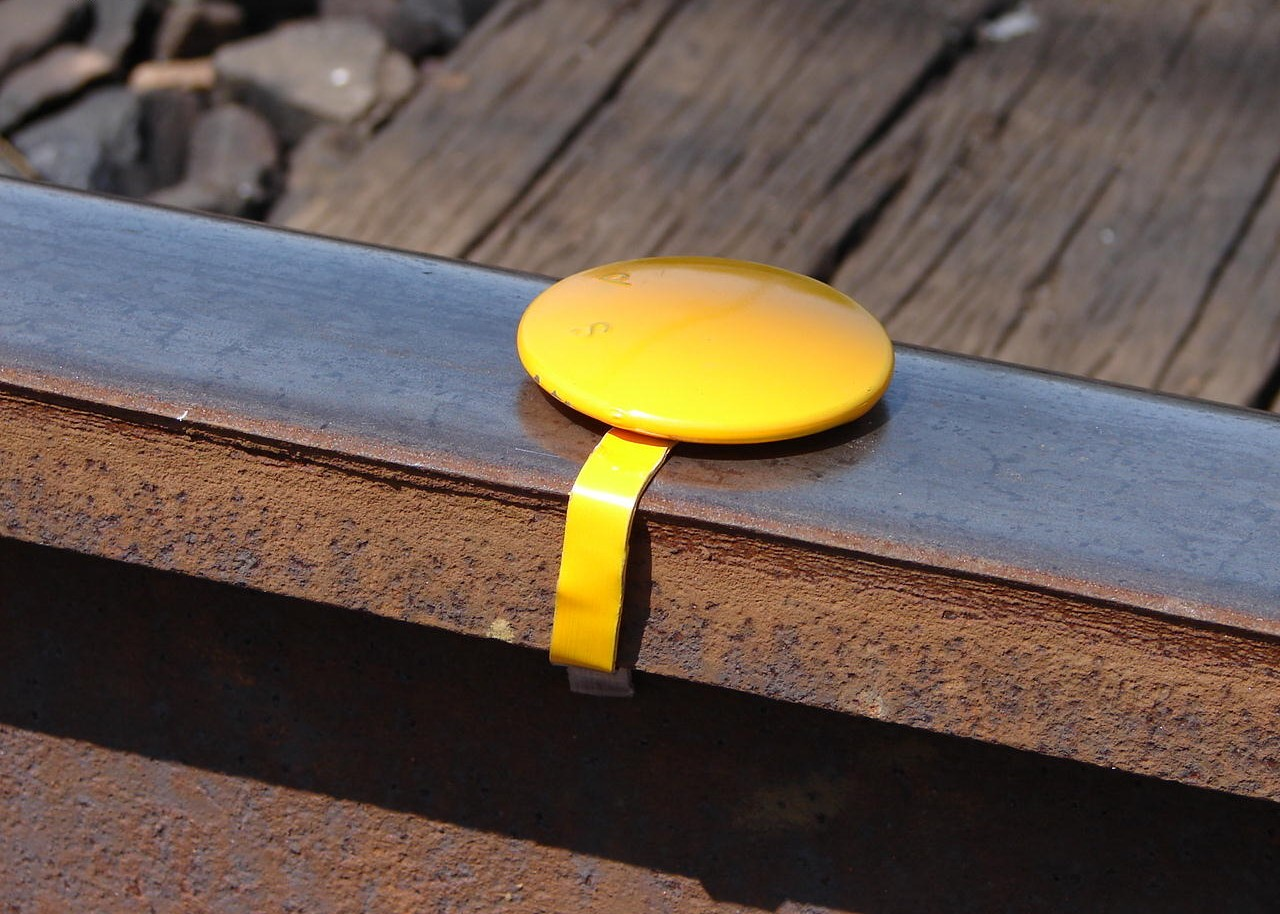
South African example

Typical uses of detonators include:

- A warning, caution or stop signal in dense fog, when signals are difficult to see
- A warning of a train stopped on the line ahead by an incident or accident—the train crew are usually responsible for placing the detonators
- A warning of ongoing engineering works ahead
- When a signaller or other railway employee requires to stop approaching trains in an emergency

On a high-speed line, detonators may need to be placed on both rails.

Like all explosives, detonators can become unstable over time and must, therefore, be replaced regularly.

They are triggered by pressure, rather than impact. This makes them safe during transport, as they normally cannot detonate in a bag or storage container.

=== In Australia ===
Today known as audible track warning signals, or audible track warning devices, detonators are used to attract the attention of train crews when track repairs or an obstruction are ahead, or when a hand signaller is acting for a signal.

=== In Germany ===
Detonators were used where hazards had to be secured and there was no time for other signaling or if there was a danger that another signal might not be recognizable in time, for example due to fog or snow. To give the emergency signal, three detonators were placed in short succession, with the explosion of a single detonator being a stop signal. Since 1986 detonators have no longer been used on German railways. Only the ICE 3 trains and other locomotives that travel to France still have detonators on board, because of French regulations.

=== In Taiwan ===
The use of detonators has been superseded by radio communications since the early 1950s. In November 2010, the Taiwan Railway Administration deployed 800 detonators for destruction on maintenance tracks. It received media attention, emitting sounds similar to the culturally significant firecrackers.

=== In Tanzania ===
Detonators are used to attract the attention of train crews in case of:

- Visibility of fixed signal restricted by fog, mist or other circumstance
- obstruction of line, whether by train or otherwise
- protection of push trolleys
- protection of shunting movement outside the station limits during total failure of communication

=== In the United States ===
Torpedoes are essentially obsolete in the U.S.; the soundproof construction of modern locomotive cabs renders them useless. However, they saw extensive use in the steam era. From the terminology book of the Brotherhood of Railroad Signalmen:

A torpedo is a device which is strapped to the top of a rail. When a train drives over the torpedo, it emits a very loud "bang" which can be heard over the noise of the engine, and signals the engineer to stop immediately. Torpedoes are generally placed by the flagman when protecting a train ahead. Torpedoes are about 2" × 2", red in color, about 3/4" high, and have two lead straps attached, which hold it to the rail. The torpedo has discs inside and are filled with detonating powder. The torpedo was invented about 1874.

Upon hearing the noise of a torpedo exploding, the engineer (BrE: driver) reduces speed to 20 mph or less, not resuming its original speed until at least two miles beyond where it encountered the device.

Torpedos were traditionally used in pairs to ensure that the sound registered with train crews; frequent exposure to engine noise and whistles often caused hearing loss amongst crew members.

In addition to protection during reduced visibility or maintenance work, torpedos also served as defense in depth for areas in the US where lineside signal lights were frequently vandalized.

=== In the United Kingdom ===
If a train unexpectedly explodes a detonator, the driver is required to stop immediately and investigate.

Detonators are usually deployed in groups of three, spaced 20 metres apart. When being used on electrified lines detonators must be placed on the rail which is furthest from the conductor rail (a.k.a. 'third rail'). If a train is about to explode a detonator, personnel are required to stand at least 30 metres away from it and turn away.

There are three types of detonator protection in the UK:

- Emergency Protection:
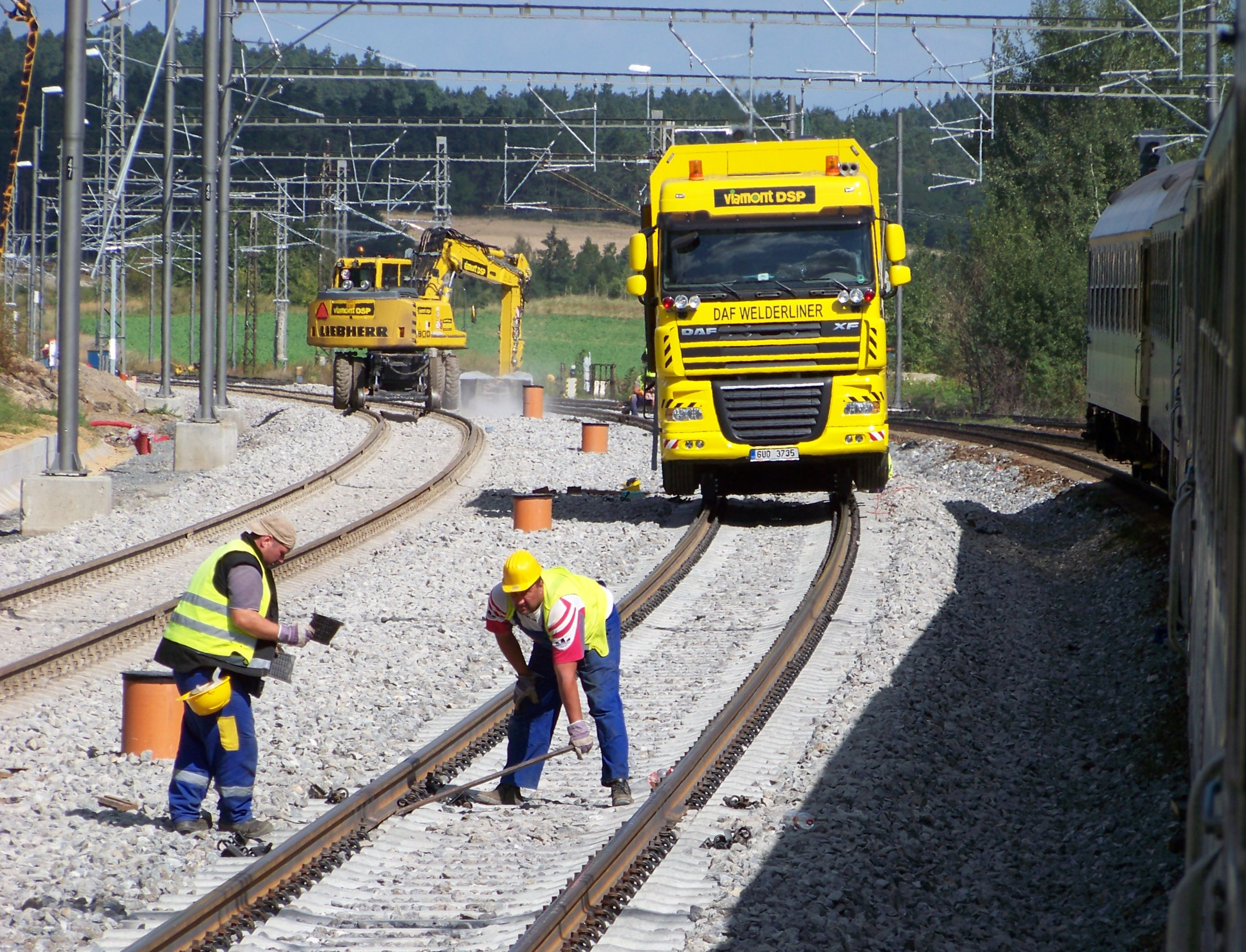
  Engineering staff working inside a possession, seen from a train passing on an active running line.
  If a train is involved in an accident or fails and it is not possible to contact the signaller, then emergency protection must be used. Track circuit operating clips (TCOC) must be placed on all affected lines, and three detonators must be placed at a distance of 2 kilometres in the direction from which a train is most likely to approach.
- Assistance Protection: If a train fails and communication can be made with the signaller, then assistance protection must be used. The driver of the failed train must place three detonators at a distance of 300 metres from the failed train in the direction from which the assisting train will approach (unless there is a stop signal within 300 metres of the rear of the failed train). The driver will remain at this assistance protection point with a red flag (or lamp in darkness) and await the assisting train.
- Possession Protection: Possessions (worksites) on the railway are operated separately from the running lines and train movements inside them are not controlled by the signaller. Instead a PICOP (person in charge of possession) controls movement into and out of the possession in co-ordination with the signaller, and an Engineering Manager is responsible for movements of rail vehicles within the possession. Three detonators and a Stop Board are positioned at the entry and exit to the possession to prevent any unauthorised trains from entering accidentally, and also to clearly define the extent of the possession.

== Detonator placer ==
Many mechanical signal boxes in the UK were equipped with detonator placers that placed detonators on a running line when a lever was operated. The levers were painted a striking white and black chevron pattern, pointing upwards for the "up" line, downwards for the "down" line. In some cases, the placers were fed from a cartridge holding a number of detonators.

== Composition ==
According to Military and Civilian Pyrotechnics by Ellern, page 376, FORMULA 155 – Railroad Torpedo, is by mass:

- Potassium chlorate – 40%
- Sulfur – 16%
- Sand (—60 mesh) – 37%
- Binder – 5%
- Neutralizer – 2%

== Garratt locomotives ==
The length of Garratt locomotives made the sound of a detonator hard to hear, so New South Wales 60 class locomotive had "sound pipes" to bring the noise of the explosion to the crew.
