= Henry Nuttall =

English cricketer

Personal information
- Full name: Henry Nuttall
- Born: 6 February 1855; Crayford, Kent
- Died: 8 October 1945 (aged 90); Bedgebury Cross, Kent
- Batting: Right-handed
- Role: Wicket-keeper

Domestic team information
- Years: Team
- 1889–1894: Kent

Career statistics
Competition	First-class
Matches	14
Runs scored	39
Batting average	3.00
100s/50s	0/0
Top score	8
Catches/stumpings	12/6
- Source: CricInfo, 9 April 2012

Henry Nuttall (6 February 1855 – 8 October 1945) was an English professional cricketer who played 14 first-class cricket matches for Kent County Cricket Club between 1889 and 1894. Nuttall played as a wicket-keeper.

Nuttall was born at Crayford in Kent in 1855. He made his first-class debut for Kent against Yorkshire in 1889 at Mote Park. He went on to make a total of 14 appearances for them, his final match coming in May 1894 against Marylebone Cricket Club (MCC).

Nuttall died at Bedgebury Cross in Kent in October 1945 aged 90.

== Bibliography ==
- Carlaw, Derek (2020). Kent County Cricketers, A to Z: Part One (1806–1914) (PDF). Cardiff: ACS.
