= Joseph Gibbs (engineer) =

British civil engineer and mechanical inventor

Joseph Gibbs (1798–1864) was a British civil engineer and mechanical inventor. He patented a series of inventions for sawing and cutting wood, metal and stone. He is also known for his design work on the Great Northern Railway and the London & Brighton Railway.

== Family ==
Gibbs was born in Staffordshire, the youngest son of a mill-owner and manufacturer. His uncle was mineral agent to the Duke of Devonshire and it was among the mines of the Derbyshire (Note: The Duke of Devonshire had mineral mines in Derbyshire.) hills that it is thought that Gibbs acquired his taste for mining and geological research.

== Career ==
He visited Holland and was engaged to work on some hydraulic works. He then went on to work in the West Indies. On his return to England he superintended the erection of several corn mills and saw mills in London. At this time he patented a series of inventions for sawing and cutting wood, metal, and stone. One invention was the Gibbs "elbow joint" which was used in the construction of inlaid floors. Floors were laid down that were composed of an infinite number of wood pieces of every kind and shape, each piece would be cut out and made accurately to fit its fellow and secured with a tongue by Gibbs's machinery, the surfacing and polishing only being done by hand.

Gibbs was engaged for several years in erecting machinery for manufacturing and also lifting water. Some of that time was spent in Holland where he persuaded the Dutch authorities that the best method of draining a lake was by the use of steam power, as opposed to wind. Gibbs and his partner, Arthur Deane, were commissioned by the Dutch Government to execute the work.

In 1831, Gibbs gave evidence to a Parliamentary select committee on steam carriages.

Gibbs had a joint patent, with printer and inventor Augustus Applegarth, awarded on 29 March, 1833, for "certain improvements in steam-carriages."

Having some experience with steam power Gibbs turned his attention to the construction of passenger railways. Some of his first designs were that of the Great Northern Railway, and for part of the line from London to Brighton. The Bill for the Great Northern Railway was thrown out by parliament (Note: In the UK an Act of Parliament is needed before a railway can be built.) so Gibbs re-surveyed the line a few years later, but this was also unsuccessful. In 1844 the scheme was again brought forward, as the London and York Railway and eventually approved by parliament, albeit in a modified form. He joined the Institution of Civil Engineers, as a Member, on 6 April 1852.

He died after what was described as "a long and painful illness" on 11 February 1864.
