= Percy G. B. Westmacott =

British mechanical engineer

Percy Graham Buchanan Westmacott (1830 Edinburgh – 10 September 1917) was a British mechanical engineer.

Westmacott undertook his apprenticeship at Miller, Ravenhill & Co, Blackwall. He joined W.G. Armstrong's Elswick Works as a draughtsman in 1851. By 1864 he was a partner in the company and in 1882 he became Managing Director.

He married Annette Beatrice (née Berners); their children were:

- Evelyn Westmacott (born c 1862)
- Claude Berners Westmacott (born 1865)
- Henry A. Westmacott (born 1866)
- John Westmacott (born c 1873)
- Lewis Westmacott (born 3 August 1871, died 27 November 1949) Married 20 April 1898, Evelyn Bayley, of Dublin.
- Mabel Westmacott (born c 1876)
- Rachel Westmacott (born c 1878)
- Gerald Westmacott (born c April 1880)

== Sources ==
- A Victorian Engineer: the life of Percy G. B. Westmacott (1830–1917), Editors Mabel Noble, Dorothy Boyd. 1973, Eyre and Spottiswoode Ltd.

Professional and academic associations
Preceded by Edward Alfred Cowper	President of the Institution of Mechanical Engineers; 1882-1883	Succeeded by Sir Lowthian Bell, 1st Baronet
