= Crayford Urban District =

Former local government area in the UK

Coordinates: 51°27′N 0°11′E

Crayford
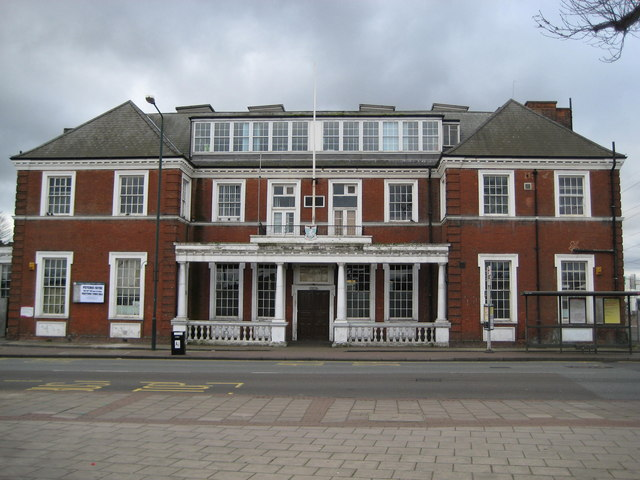
- Crayford Town Hall
- Area
- 9.935 km^{2} (3.836 sq mi)
- History
  - Created: 1 October 1920
  - Abolished: 1965
  - Succeeded by: London Borough of Bexley
- Status: Urban district
- Government
  - HQ: Crayford
  - Motto: FORTITER ET RECTE (BOLDLY AND RIGHTLY)

Crayford Urban District was a local government district in north west Kent from 1920 to 1965 around the town of Crayford. As well as Crayford, it included Barnehurst, Barnes Cray and Slade Green.

It was created an urban district in 1920 from part of Dartford Rural District. It acquired an early 20th-century building that had been used by Vickers as a canteen and converted it into Crayford Town Hall in 1929.

In 1965 it was abolished by the London Government Act 1963 and its former area was combined with that of other districts to form the London Borough of Bexley.

== Population and demographics ==
The 1921 census was the first census held after formation, and included population data from 1911.

Census	Population	Males	Females	Density
1911	6,234	—	—	
1921	11,926	6,034	5,892	4.9 people/acre
