= St. Paulinus Church, Bexley =

Church in London, England

Church of St Paulinus
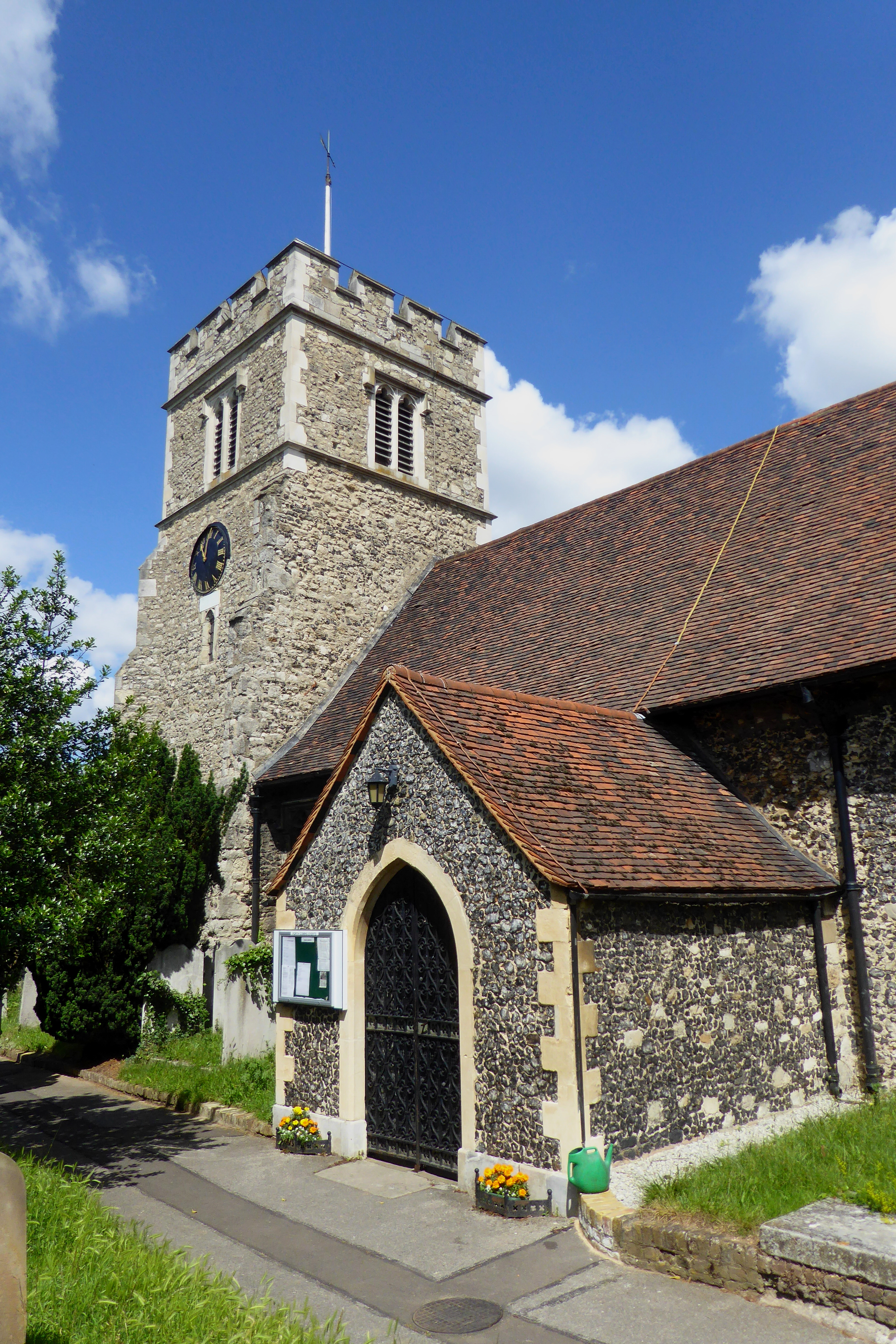
- Interactive map of Church of St Paulinus
- Coordinates: 51°27′17″N 0°10′28″E

Listed Building – Grade II
- Official name: Church of St Paulinus
- Designated: 20 May 1952
- Reference no.: 1359434

St. Paulinus Church is a Grade II* listed church. Located in Crayford, Bexley, London. One of the six ancient churches lying within the London Borough of Bexley.

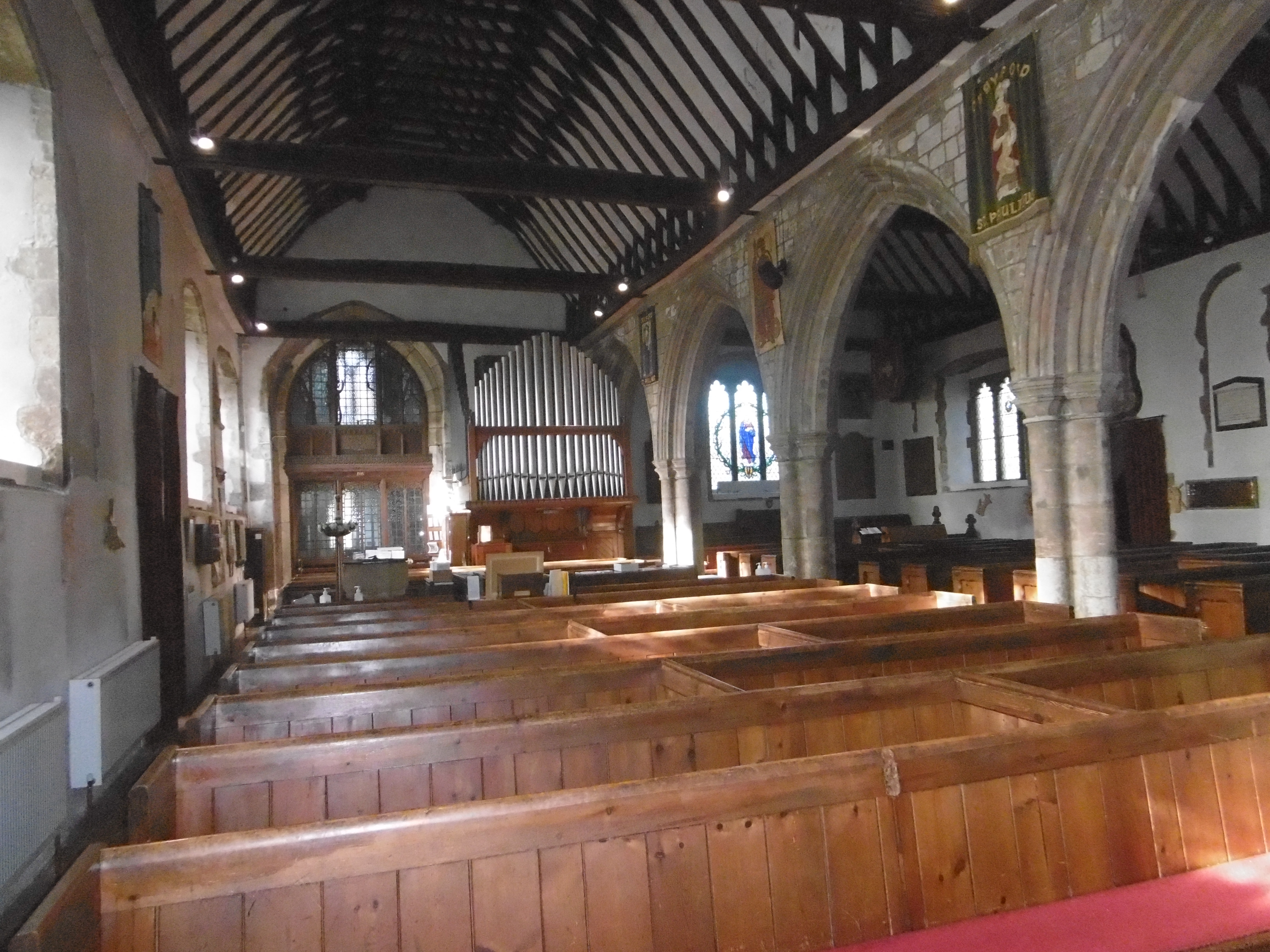
The interior looking west: two almost equal vessels

== History ==
The church was located on the road between London and the mainland, which accounted for the large number of visitors.

The earliest part of the church dates from about the year 1100 A.D. Was presumably built by the Normans. This is indicated by the found material of construction - dark gray blocks of tufa.

In about 1190, an aisle was added to the south of the nave and a south chapel was joined to the chancel. The windows were also replaced with larger ones.

Some time within the first half of the 14th century, the south chapel and aisle were pulled down, and the body of the church got its present shape.

In the 15th and early 16th century the vestry and the porch were added, bell tower was erected. The south, or Howbury, chapel was built and between the vestry and the north nave, of the northern chapel.

In 1558, the church began keeping a church register.

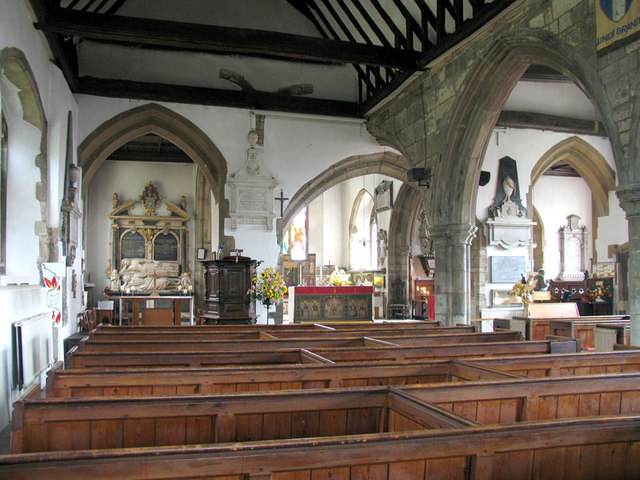
The interior looking east: arcade in the line of the central axis of the chancel

A disastrous fire happened in 1628, which consumed the roof and all the ancient monuments. After several years of repairs, the church was up and running again.

In 1700 Sir Cloudesley Shovel, Admiral and Commander in Chief of the Fleet of Great Britain paid for the repairs and also presented a new reredos.

In 1862 a general restoration was again carried out and the Howbury chapel was extended for use as an organ chamber.

The church was significantly damaged during the Second World War.

In the 1960s, vestries for the clergy and choir were built. In 1976 a new organ purchased from St.Mary's German Lutheran Church in King's Cross and erected.

== Architecture ==
The body of the nave consists of two vessels of equal widths and heights, and the arcade between them targets to the middle axis of the chancel. This balance is extraordinary in English medieval architecture, which has hundreds of two-vessel hall churches (or two-vessel multicellular churches), but most of them with a ranking difference of nave and aisle.

== Gallery ==
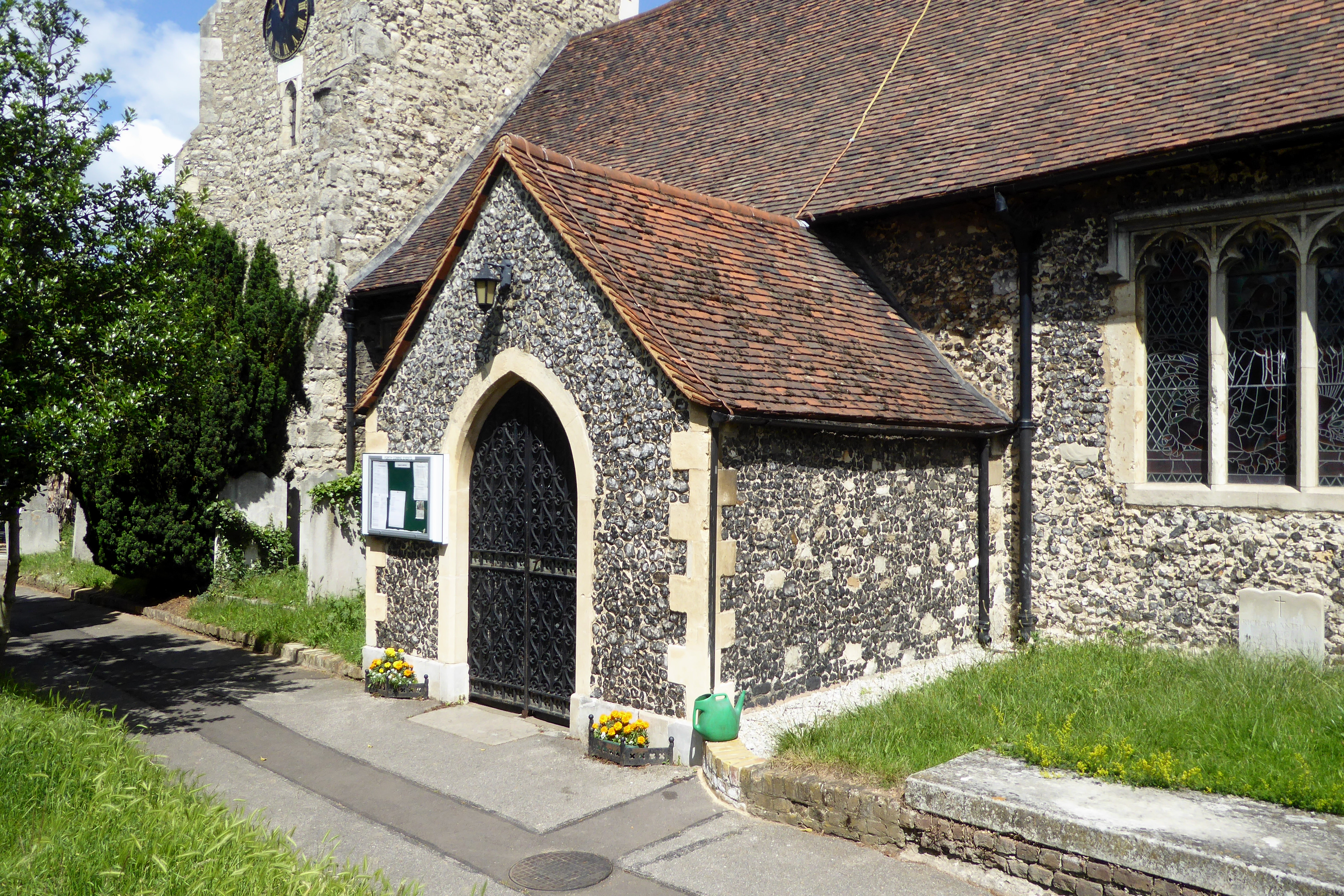
Porch of St Paulinus' Church

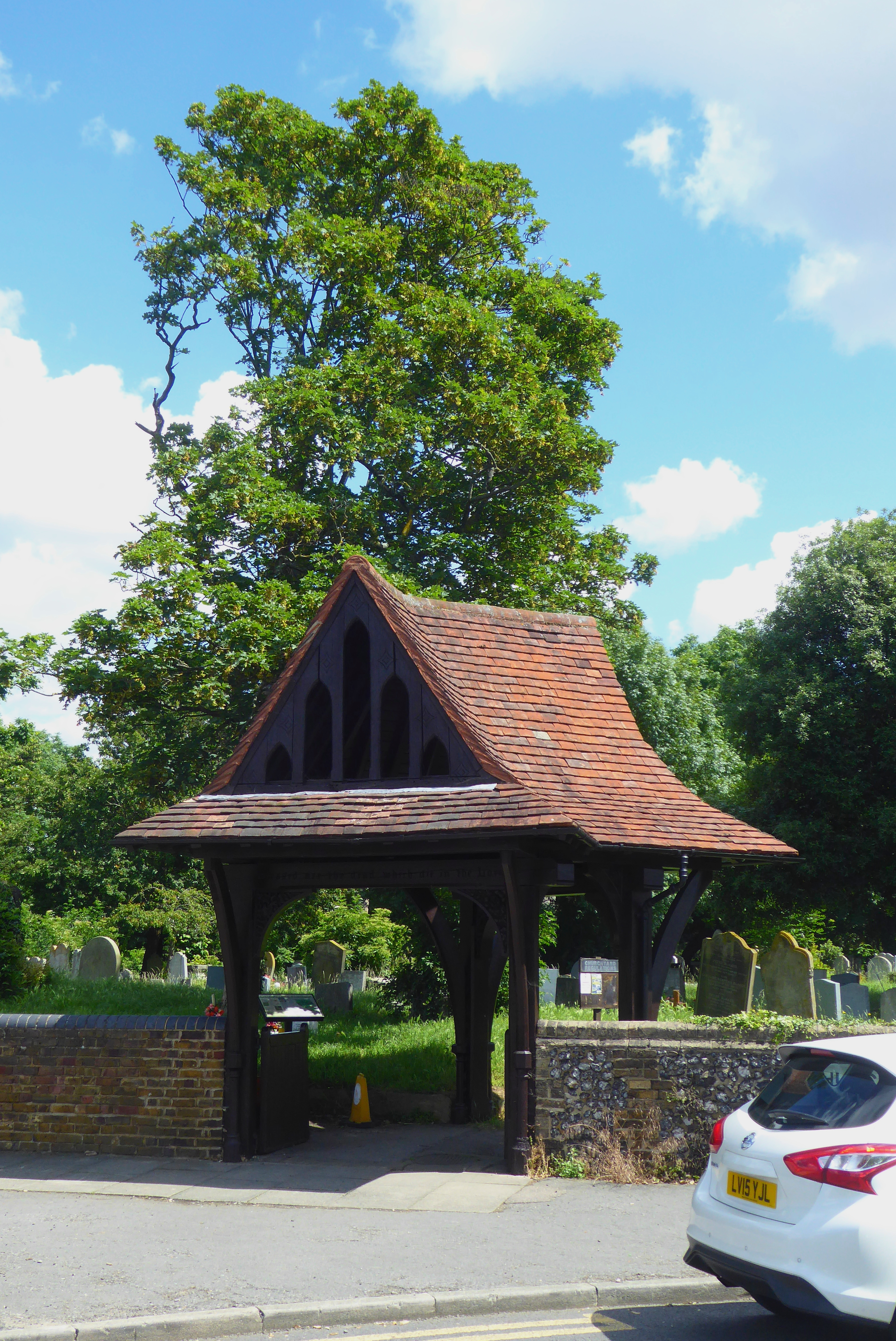
Lychgate of St Paulinus' Church

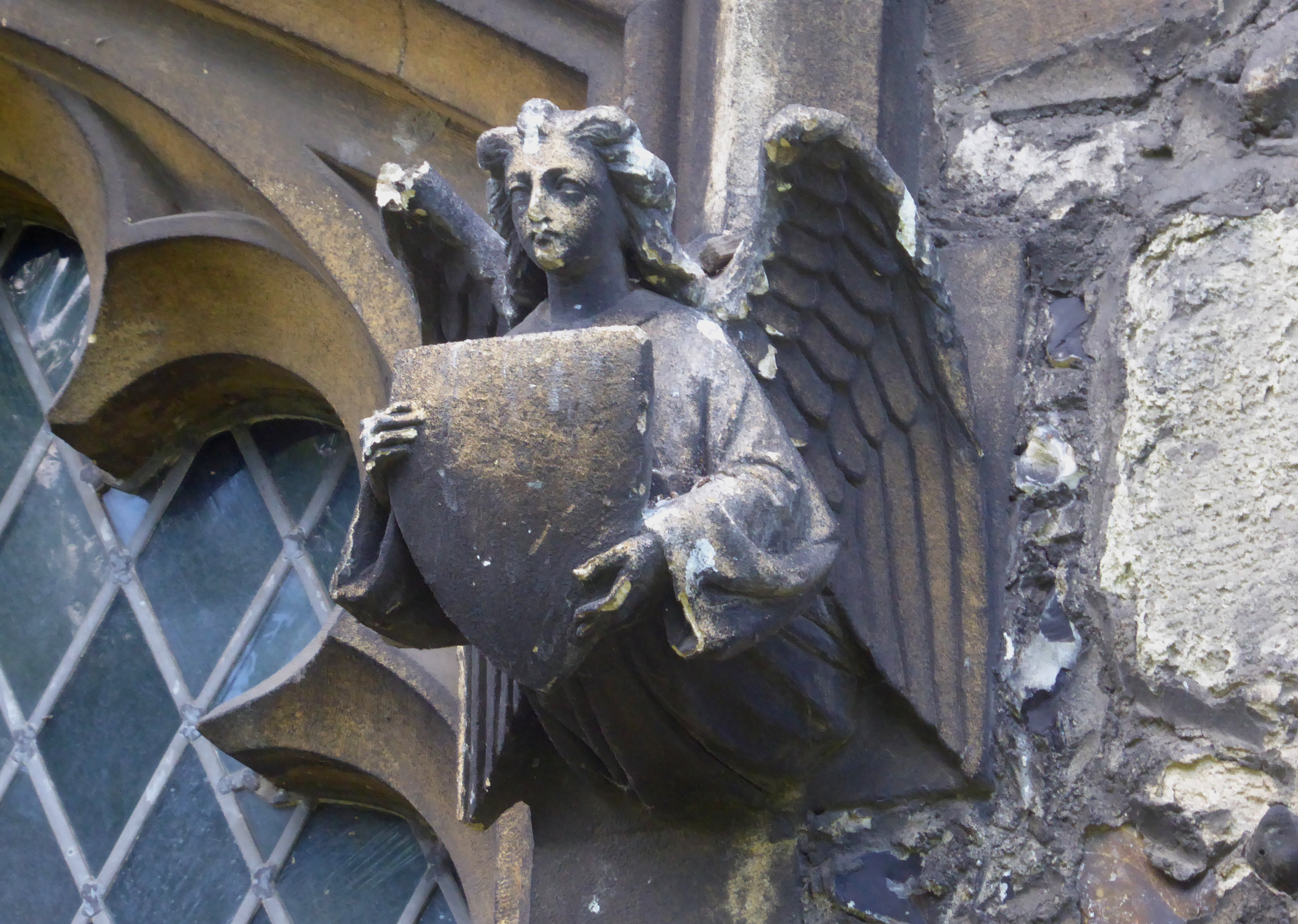
Angel Sculpture on the Church of Saint Paulinus

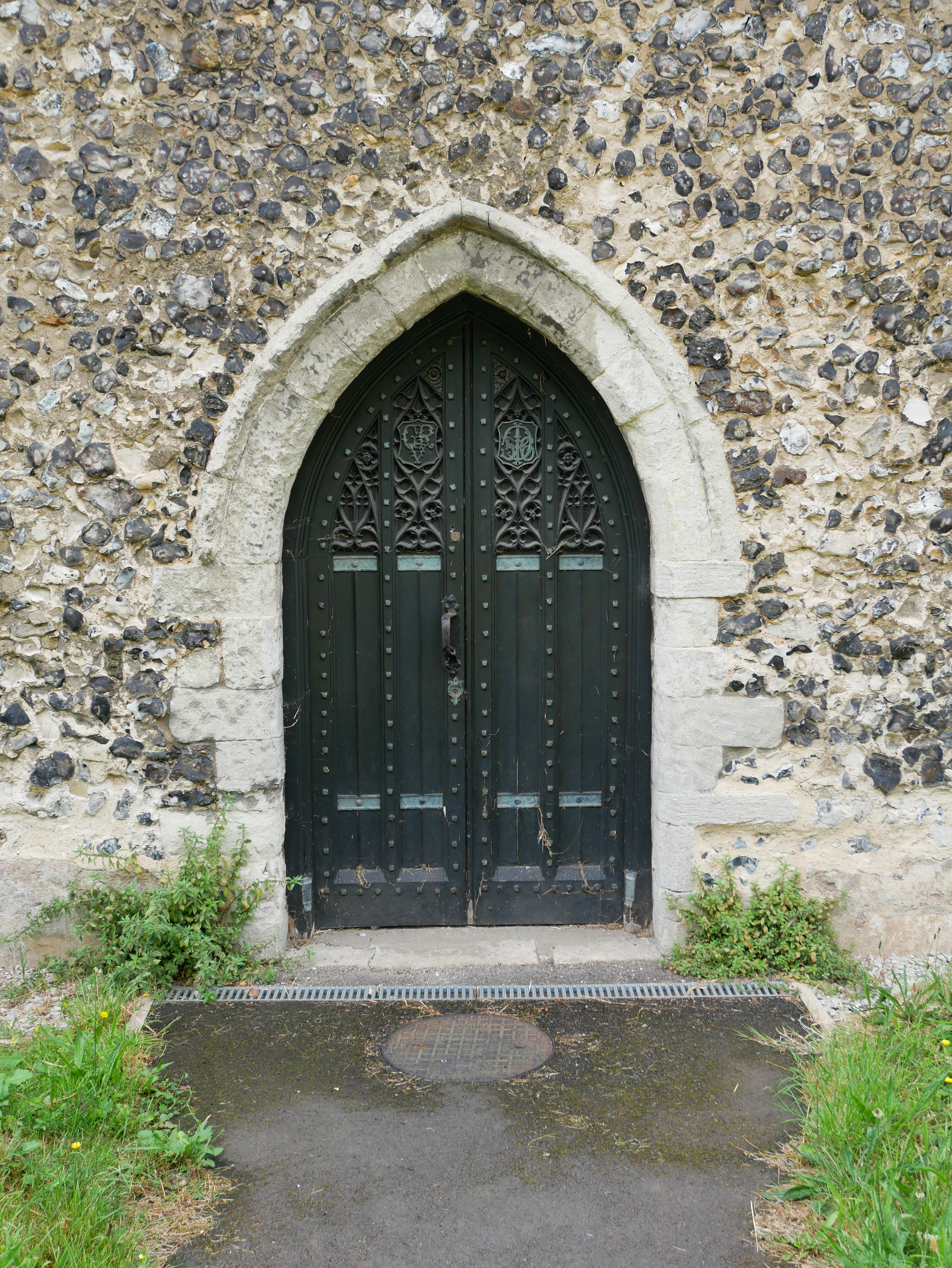
Door on the Northern Side of Saint Paulinus' Church

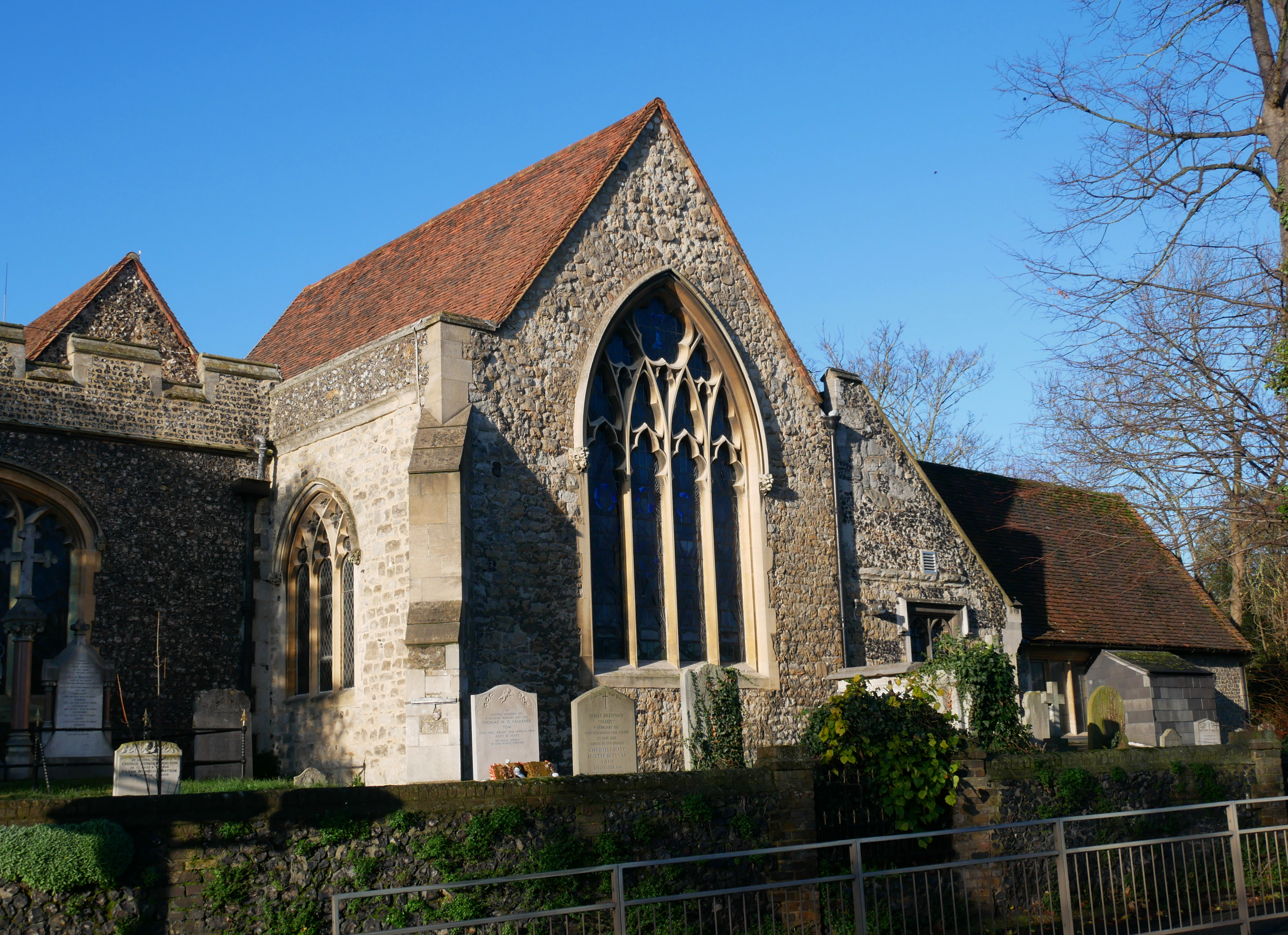
East End of the Church of Saint Paulinus

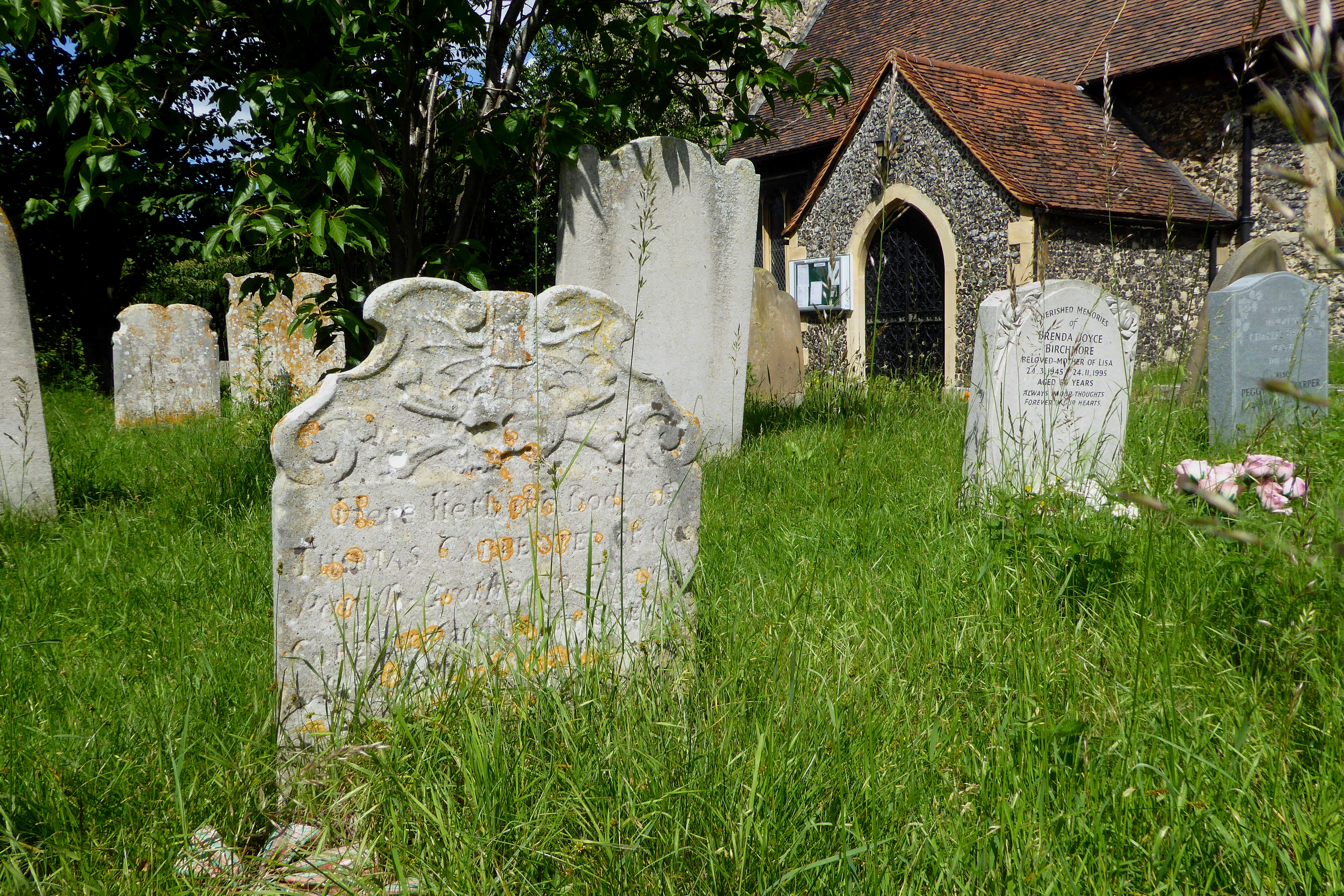
Eighteenth-Century Grave in the Churchyard of St Paulinus
