= Augustus Applegath =

English printer and inventor

- Born: 17 June 1788; Stepney, London UK
- Died: 9 February 1871 (aged 82)

Often appears mis-spelt as "Augustus Applegarth"

Augustus Applegath (17 June 1788 – 9 February 1871) was an English printer and inventor known for the development of the first workable vertical-drum rotary printing press.

== Early life ==
Applegath was born in the Stepney district of London, the second child of Augustus Joseph Applegath, a captain in the East India Company and his wife, Ann, née Lepard. He went to school at Alfred House Academy in London and apprenticed with Benjamin Lepard, a wholesale stationer, at Covent Garden. In collaboration with his brother-in-law Edward Cowper (1790–1852), he carried out most of his work in the Dartford and Crayford areas of Kent.

== Career ==
Applegath was a skilled printer who notably made a number of improvements to the steam-powered flat-bed press of Friedrich Konig (1813). Other inventions included processes for printing on silk and, in 1816, improvements to banknote printing. By 1819, Applegath's banknote machine was installed at the Bank of England.

In 1828, Applegath and Cowper built a flatbed printing machine for The Times in London. This press had the capacity of 4,200 prints per hour.

William Nicholson had patented a rotary printing press in 1790, but attempts to build a working prototype had been unsuccessful. It was not until 1848 that Applegath developed a working version. In that same year, it replaced the flatbed printer that had been in use at The Times for almost twenty years.

The design consisted of a large vertical cylinder, 200 inches in circumference. Ordinary type was used in columns to produce a polygonal printing surface. It had eight impression cylinders and needed eight people to feed the paper. It could produce 8,000 impressions per hour (on one side of the paper) and eventually up to 10,000 depending on the skill of those feeding it. A four-cylinder version of Applegath's press as used by the Illustrated London News was featured at The Great Exhibition of 1851 in London.

At the same time, Richard Hoe of New York was developing a more efficient horizontal rotary press which as available with two, four, six or ten impression cylinders. The first one of this type was imported by Edward Lloyd in 1856 and was soon adopted by many newspapers including The Times.

Applegath had a joint patent, with engineer and inventor Joseph Gibbs, awarded on 29 March, 1833, for "certain improvements in steam-carriages."
