= Slade Green =

Area in southeast London

Coordinates: 51.468°N 0.189°E

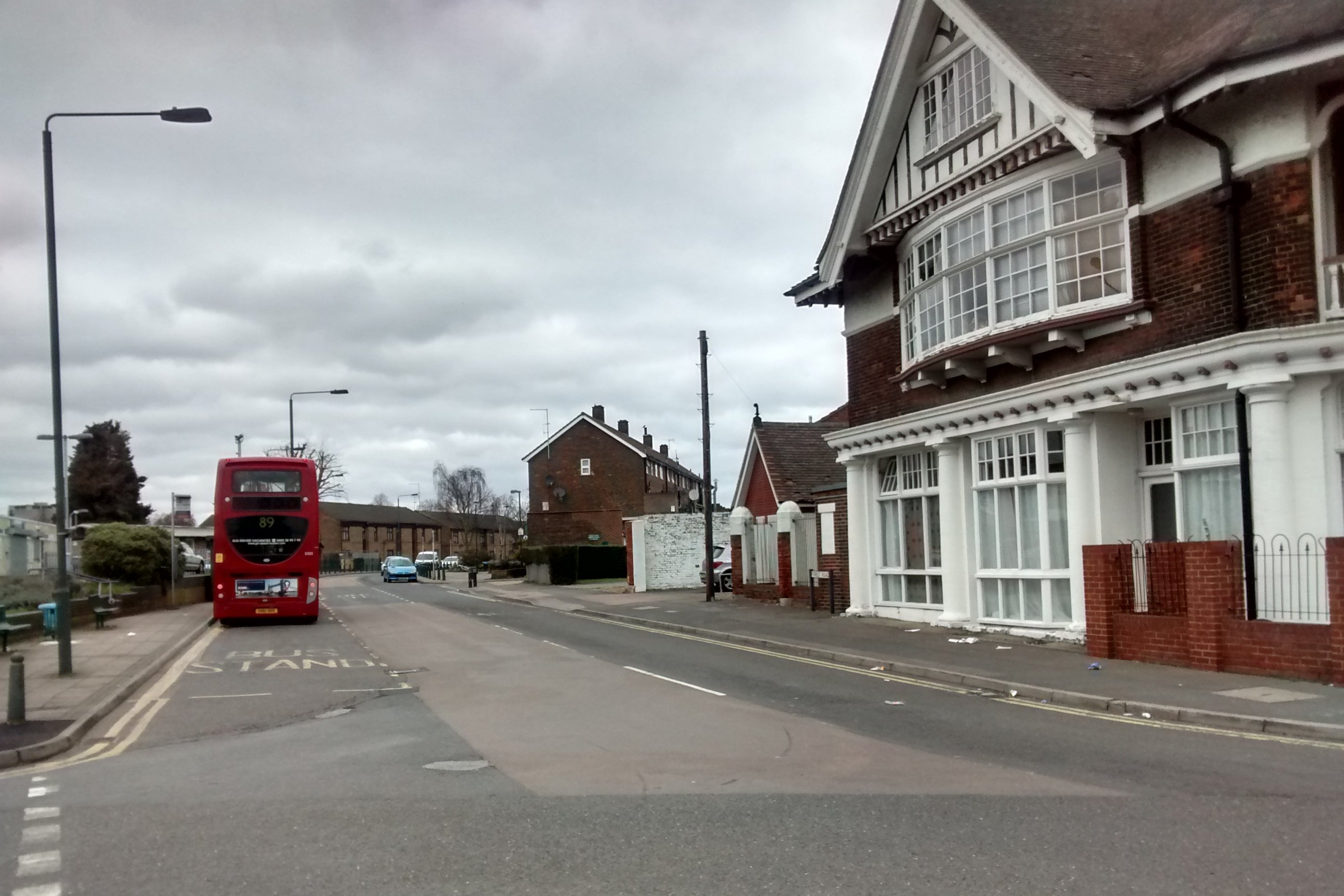

- Location within Greater London
- OS grid reference: TQ5376
  - Charing Cross: 14 mi (23 km) WNW
- London borough: Bexley
- Ceremonial county: Greater London
- Region: London
- Country: England
- Sovereign state: United Kingdom
- Post town: ERITH
- Postcode district: DA8
- Dialling code: 01322
- Police: Metropolitan
- Fire: London
- Ambulance: London
- UK Parliament: Bexleyheath and Crayford
- London Assembly: Bexley and Bromley

Slade Green is an area of South East London, England, within the London Borough of Bexley. It lies northeast of Bexleyheath, northwest of Dartford and south of Erith, and 13 miles (21 km) east-southeast of Charing Cross.

Historically Slade Green was part of the county of Kent. In 1965 it became part of the new ceremonial county of Greater London.

== History and development ==
=== Etymology ===
The Bosworth-Toller Anglo-Saxon Dictionary says that "Slade" most commonly meant a broad strip of grass-covered land. The London Borough of Bexley suggests the current name most likely derives from Saxon "Slade", with their definition being low-lying ground. An alternative is the Old Norse "Slad", meaning a place for launching boats. Most sources agree that "Green" was added to reflect the deep colour of the grass-covered ground. Sources differ on when Slade Green was first mentioned with one suggesting the 16th Century.

=== Prehistory ===
Collectors such as Flaxman Charles John Spurrell discovered diverse Palaeolithic fossils around Slade Green, along with flint artefacts that provide evidence of prehistoric human habitation. Pre-war maps indicate a barrow stood near the current Hazel Drive children's play area, and the Museum of London Archaeological Service revealed the presence of a prehistoric cookery pit at Hollywood Way.

=== Medieval ===
Some sources claim the area is recorded in the Domesday Book as Hov, and others suggest this was Hou (later Howbury). An early translation states that Howbury was a hamlet on the bank of River Darent, which is approximately 1 km east of the small Slade Green hamlet recorded by 19th Century geographers. According to Bexley borough council, this medieval hamlet was held by Askell. Askell the Priest from Abingdon Abbey held estates in various parts of England and bequeathed titles to Hugh d'Avranches, Earl of Chester.

A moated seigneurial residence was built much closer Slade Green in the High Middle Ages, with its country house completed during the English Renaissance, and these structures were named Howbury Manor. An adjacent tithe barn, with 17th Century styling, has not been accurately dated. Surrounding green belt marshes contain willows thought to have been planted over 300 years ago to shelter livestock.

See also History of Kent and Kingdom of Kent

=== Victorian ===
The communities of North End and Slades Green (formerly Slads Green) had remained disjointed throughout the British Agricultural Revolution. Samuel Lewis' 1848 A Topographical Dictionary of England states that Slades Green was the smaller hamlet with 66 people. While judicial, political and cultural boundaries are continually revised to address various concerns, the tracks of the North Kent Line have been the immovable border between North End and Slade Green since c. 1849.

Evidence suggests the region remained sparsely populated yet highly productive throughout the Industrial Revolution. The 1869–1882 Ordnance Survey recorded a particularly large "Sladesgreen Farm" with its south-west corner occupied by "The Corner Pin" beerhouse. The pub was demolished and rebuilt in 1958. The surrounding area was affectionately known locally as "Cabbage Island" in reference to the market gardens located between Moat Lane (formerly Whitehall Lane) and Slade Green Road (formerly Slade Green Lane). Victorian photographic evidence captures the high crop yield of these agricultural gardens at Slade Green. Historic maps also chronicle an increasing number of clay pits along the railway on the North End side of the tracks. Marshes are a natural source of clays and brick earths, and local firms produced large numbers of London stock bricks throughout the 19th Century. "Furner of Slade Green" operated the North End brickworks from 1867 to 1911. Slade Green gained a National School in 1868, and became a village when St. Augustine's Church opened in 1899.

The isolated Crayford Marshes, which could support barges along the Rivers Thames and Darent, were seen as an ideal location for the 40 acre ammunition works that may have operated from 1879 to 1962. Noted mechanical engineer, Hugh Ticehurst MBE, worked at the site from 1893 to 1930. A comparison of historic and contemporary maps confirms that the boundaries of the Victorian site outline the current Darent Industrial Estate or Crayford Ness Industrial Area.

=== Edwardian ===
Rapid expansion followed the construction of a major rail depot designed to service 100 steam locomotives for South Eastern and Chatham Railway. A small station was added to serve the depot and community on 1 July 1900 (its name changed from Slades Green station to Slade Green station in 1953), and by 1910 the complete 'railway village' of 158 houses had been built. It follows that today's much larger and more densely populated Slade Green could be described as a railway town.

By 1902 the secure Thames Munition Works was operated by Armstrong Whitworth and equipped with a Thames pier connected to an internal railway.

Bexley borough's archived photos suggest the significance of the village had increased by 1905 and that it had absorbed historically important Howbury Manor.

=== First World War ===
NTWFF Erith, a National Trench Warfare Filling Factory, was constructed next to the larger Thames Munition Works in 1915. For a short time a mortar filling station was connected to Slade Green station by the 1½ mile “Trench Warfare Light Railway”.

Miss Mary Edith Sheffield, identified only as a superintendent at the Thames Ammunition Works in the Crayford Marshes adjacent to Slade Green, was awarded MBE in King George V's 1918 Birthday Honours.

=== Interwar ===
Slade Green endured a national tragedy. En-masse explosions at a former Trench Warfare Filling Factory operated by Messrs. W.V. Gilbert, a contractor to the Disposal and Liquidation Commission, caused blinding flashes and the death of 13 workers— 12 teenage girls and one man who was their foreman— on 18 February 1924. The W.V. Gilbert factory was near to or adjoining Thames Munition Works. The parliamentary debate that followed showed that the contract did not require a Fair Wages Clause, and was exempt from the provisions of the Explosives Act of 1875. A prominent mass grave at Northumberland Heath stands in memory of the victims.

Development may have stagnated in the interwar years. Records show a Baptist Church was built on Elm road in the early 1930s, and Anti-Aircraft defences were constructed on the edge of Slade Green in the late 1930s.

Variant spelling persisted as evidenced by Parliament recording "Slade Green" in 1924 and at least one chartered geographer recording "Slades Green" in 1933. Thames Munition Works Ltd. became part of the Vickers-Armstrongs conglomerate in 1927.

=== Second World War ===
Throughout Second World War the marshes were used for the 4.5-inch HAA (Heavy Anti-Aircraft) Guns of the 6th Anti-Aircraft Division, corresponding with No. 11 Group RAF. The 4th Home Counties Brigade (Kent) formed from volunteers in the surrounding area in 1908, deployed overseas, and manned London's air defences at Slade Green in 1941. The disused command post and circular battery ramparts remain in the marshes between Slade Green and the former munition works. Slade Green was subject to a series of air raids, notably the night of 16 April 1941 when incendiary raids caused many fires and explosions capable of levelling the area; these threats were contained by the brave intervention of residents resulting in the award of three British Empire Medals and a George Medal. The Museum of London states that Howbury Manor House, pictured within the moated medieval walls, was bombed during an air raid and then demolished. RAF campaign diaries show Thames Ammunition Works was hit on 12 October 1940. During the war the community was served by a British Restaurant operating from St. Augustine's Church Hall, which supplied up to 250 lunches six days a week to residents, the school, and nearby factories.

=== Postwar ===
Aerial photographs taken during the North Sea flood of 1953 show the Thames Munition Works. Explosives operations ended in the 1960s, and Bexley borough council gave planning permission for an industrial estate on the site in the 1970s.

Slade Green emerged as a London suburb in the post-war era following the construction of at least 1050 new dwellings, and a road bridge spanning the North Kent Line.

=== Notable buildings and structures ===
The Scheduled Ancient Monument known as Howbury Moat or Howbury Manor (c. 900), and a Grade II Listed Tithe Barn (c.1600s), are located between Slade Green and Crayford Marshes. According to Historic England, the interior of the medieval moated site includes a 16th or 17th century country house, with some significant surviving architectural details, and it appears to the Secretary of State to be of national importance. Holders of the Manor of Howbury included Bishop Odo, Roger Apylton (aka Appleton) and Sir Cloudesley Shovell. After Apylton had May Place built in Crayford, occupants of the moated site were tenant farmers, and after the building of a new house (Howbury Grange) for the tenant farmer in 1882, by farm labourers, until the building was condemned in 1934. Photographic evidence from 1935 provides a glimpse of Howbury Manor House, which was bombed and demolished during WW2. In 2006 the medieval moat site was the subject of an English Heritage sponsored research project by the University of Oxford's Geography Department into techniques of Soft Wall Capping for preservation purposes.

Following an investigation by English Heritage, the Department for Culture, Media and Sport listed the Second World War anti-aircraft batteries in Slade Green's London artillery zone.

Locally listed buildings are the former Railway Tavern, the Grange and Cottages at Howbury farm, and train sheds with works. Oak Road is a conservation area with Railway workers' cottages dating to 1900. The former Railway Tavern (1a Moat Lane), built by Smith & Sons of South Norwood around 1899, was notable for being illuminated by electricity.

St. Augustine's Church was built in 1899 and extended in 1911. Substantial rebuilding was required following a direct hit during a Second World War air raid in 1944 and following a fire in 1991 that destroyed the roof along with much of the internal fabric.

== Present and future ==
=== Social ===
In 2013 the Communities Secretary recognised the endurance of historic county borders. Slade Green is in the historic county of, but not the non-metropolitan administrative county of Kent.

The Howbury Centre was replaced with a new Slade Green & Howbury Community Centre in 2014, which hosts the public library and many social activities.

Churches include New Hope Church who meet at Slade Green Baptist Chapel and St Augustine's Church, the Anglican parish church. In addition a Pentecostal church meets in the Anglican church hall.

There are two pubs, and other bars at the Slade Green Railway Club and Erith Yacht Club. The latter relocated from Erith to a site on the edge of Slade Green in 1900. Slade Green F.C. last competed in 2009.

=== Environment ===
The adjacent Crayford Marshes have been recognised as ecologically significant since c. 1980 and are now designated a Site of Special Scientific Interest. The area is popular with bird watchers and video footage shows breeding seals on the waterfront. Bexley borough council has discussed intentions to meet the needs of residents as well as the needs of protected amphibians and reptiles. The site of listed HAA batteries is managed by the London Wildlife Trust.

=== Development ===
Slade Green is identified in the London Plan as being part of Bexley Riverside and has continued as a target for urban regeneration since at least 2011. Current applications include converting rail-side scrubland into modern housing.

Nature conservation at Crayford Ness requires Bexley council to normally resist developments that increase lorry traffic around Slade Green. The town is increasingly a mix of privately owned residential properties benefiting from short commuting times to the City of London. Local industry is confined to the site of the old works and areas adjacent to the large railway carriage depot.

Various types of investors are attracted to Slade Green's unique combination of strategic rail infrastructure and close proximity to national road network via the M25 at the Dartford Crossing. Some commercial developments immediately outside Slade Green are influenced by London Assembly's Bexley Riverside Opportunity and Intensification Area.

== Local governance ==
Slade Green was part of Dartford Rural District in Kent, as created by the Local Government Act 1894. In 1920 the area became part of the Crayford Urban District of Kent. In 1965, under the London Government Act 1963, the Crayford Urban District was abolished, and its area became part of the present-day London Borough of Bexley in Greater London.

Since 2018, Slade Green has been in the electoral ward of Slade Green and Northend in the UK Parliament constituency of Bexleyheath and Crayford. It was previously part of the electoral ward of North End.

Slade Green is represented at the London Assembly by Bexley and Bromley.

== Education ==
=== Primary ===
Slade Green contains one of two campuses in Haberdashers' Crayford Temple Grove Primary, which is part of Haberdashers' Crayford Academy. Ofsted's report shows the larger Crayford Academy is a good school, with an increasing number of students at Slade Green making good progress. The nearest faith schools for this age group are operated by Trinitas Academy Trust. These primary schools include Christ Church (CofE), which Ofsted reports as outstanding, and St. Paul's (CofE) that has yet to be inspected.

=== Secondary ===
Slade Green Secondary School, later known as Howbury Grange, closed in 1992 and Bexley Council's Secondary Pupil Referral Unit closed in 2008. The nearest secondary schools are Haberdashers' Crayford Academy, Leigh Academy Bexley, Dartford Grammar School, and Dartford Grammar School for Girls.

== Places of worship ==
- St. Augustine's Church (Anglican)
- New Hope Church Slade Green (Non-denominational)

== Transport ==
=== Road ===
Slade Green adjoins the main A206 dual carriageway, which follows the River Thames to Greenwich passing near the Blackwall Tunnel. Another efficient route to inner London is the A2 road via Crayford and Hall Place. In the opposite direction, the A206 road terminates near Bluewater after feeding Junction 1A of the M25 motorway.

=== Rail ===
Slade Green railway station provides the area with National Rail services to Luton via Woolwich Arsenal and London Blackfriars, London Charing Cross via Woolwich Arsenal and Lewisham, London Cannon Street via Woolwich Arsenal, London Cannon Street via Bexleyheath, London Cannon Street via Sidcup, Dartford and Rainham.

=== Bus ===
Slade Green is served by London Buses routes 89, 99, 428 and N89. These connect Slade Green with areas including Bexleyheath, Blackheath, Bluewater, Crayford, Dartford, Erith, Lewisham, Welling and Woolwich.
