= Crayford Town Hall =

Municipal building in London, England

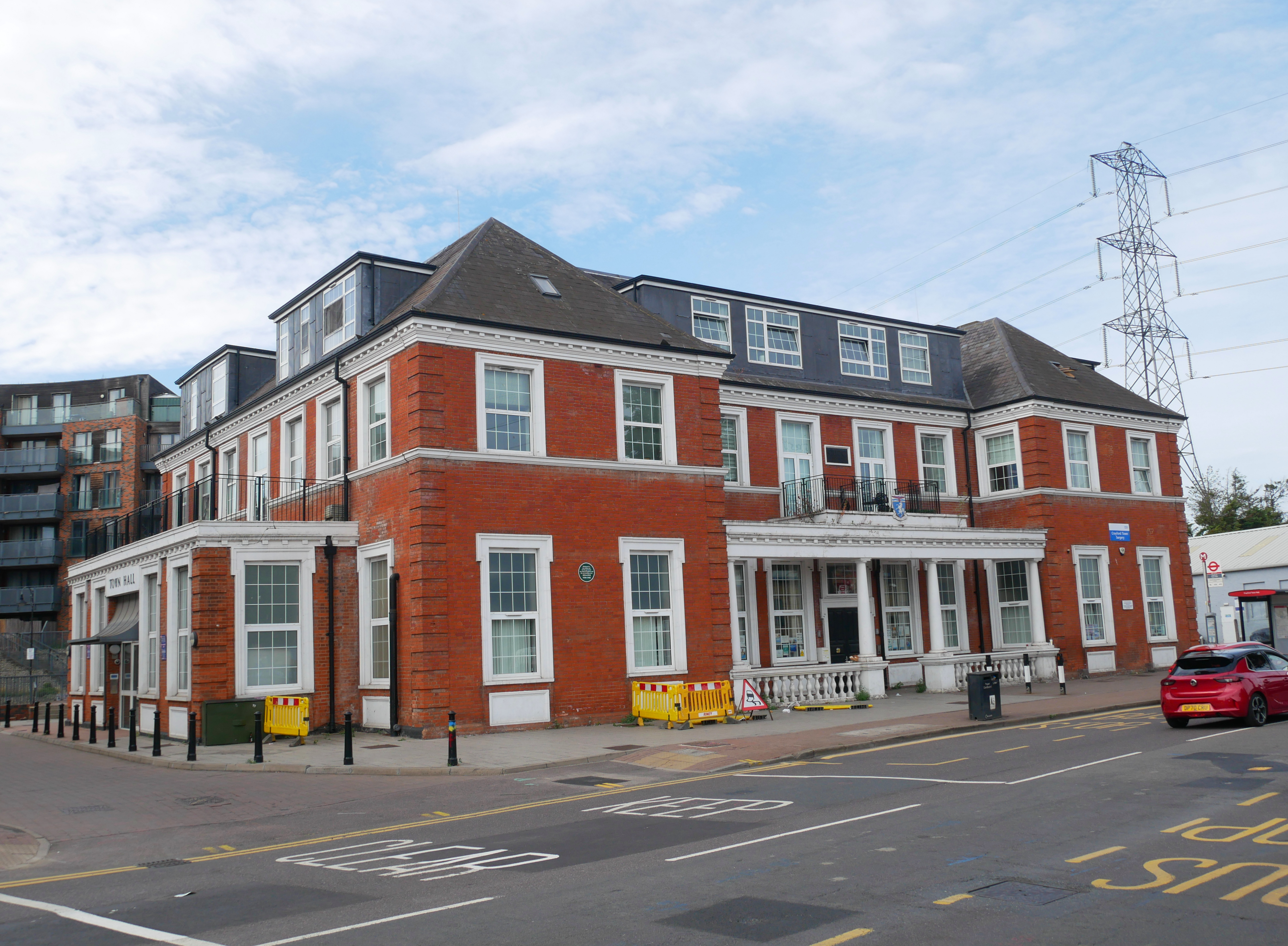
- Northeast view of Crayford Town Hall

- Shown in Bexley
- 51.4501°N 0.1805°E
- Location: Crayford Road, Crayford

History
- Built: 1915

Site notes
- Architectural style: Queen Anne style

Crayford Town Hall is a former municipal building in Crayford Road, Crayford, London, England. The structure, which was formerly the offices and meeting place of Crayford Urban District Council, is a locally listed building.

== History ==
The building was originally commissioned as a canteen and mess room for the local armaments factory in Crayford which had been established by the Maxim Nordenfelt Guns and Ammunition Company in the 1880s and then been acquired by Vickers in 1897. The canteen was designed in the Queen Anne style, built in red brick and was completed in 1915. The design involved a symmetrical main frontage with nine bays facing Crayford Road with the end two bays on each side projected forward as pavilions; the central section of five bays featured a central doorway flanked by sash windows with a row of four sash windows on the first floor. The end bays were also fenestrated by sash windows on both floors. Internally, the principal room was the main hall on the ground floor.

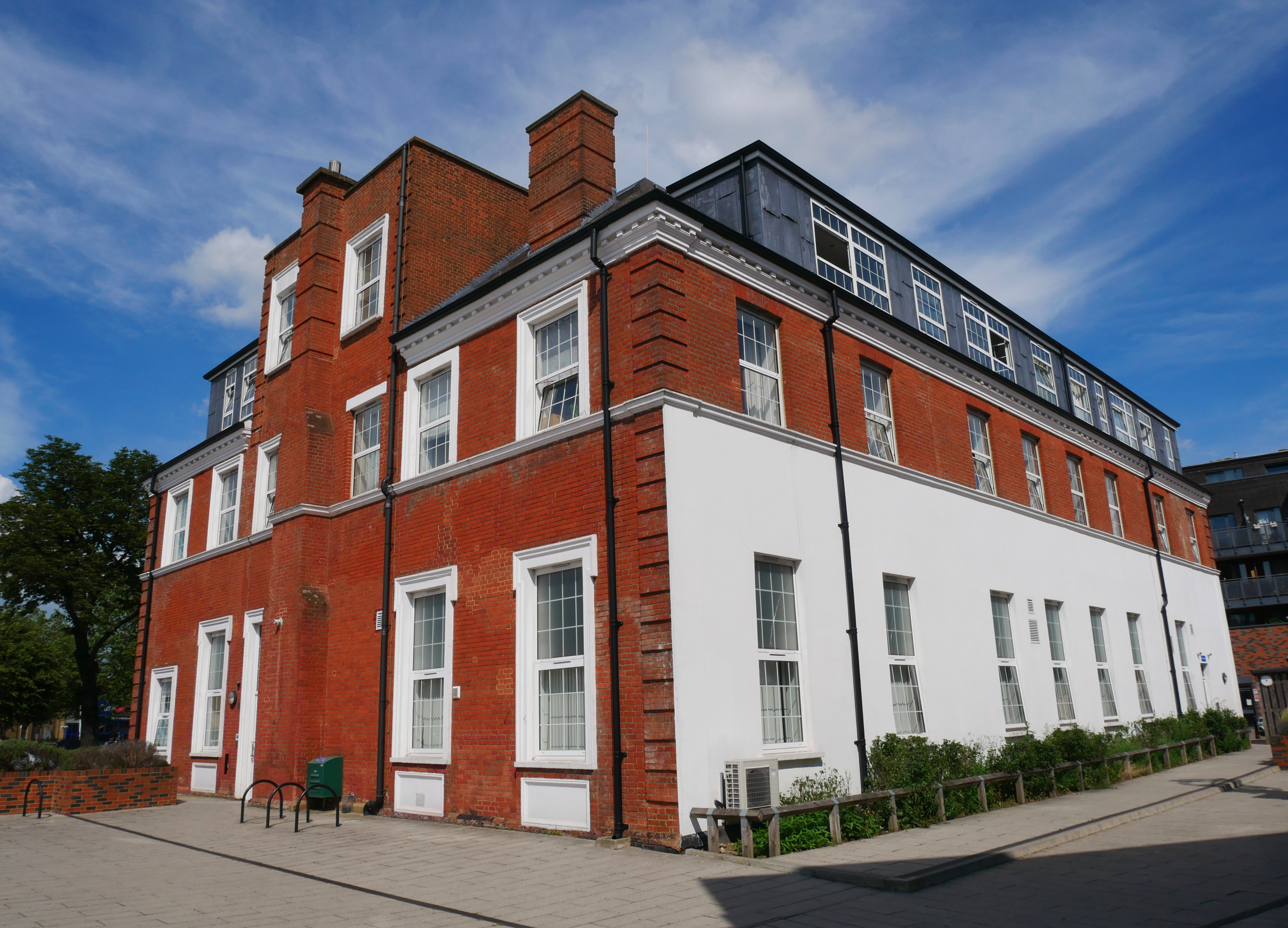
Southwest view of Crayford Town Hall

Following significant population growth during the First World War, largely because of the expansion of the armaments factory, Crayford became an urban district in 1920. Armaments production reduced significantly after the end of the war and the building became surplus to requirements and was acquired by the council in 1929. The council converted it into a municipal building, establishing its offices on the first floor and adding a portico, a balcony bearing the town's coat of arms and a flagpole to the front elevation.

In the 1951 United Kingdom general election, one of the candidates standing for the Dartford constituency was the future Prime Minister, Margaret Thatcher, who gave a speech at Crayford Town Hall about the Conservative Party's policy on peace. The building ceased to be the local seat of government when the enlarged London Borough of Bexley was formed in 1965. However, it continued to be used by Bexley Council for the delivery of local services and was extensively refurbished in 1995. The main hall was also used as an events venue and performers in the late 20th century included the singer, Sam Bailey, who took part in her first competition there.

In the early 21st century it became apparent that the dance floor in the main hall had subsided and that further restoration work was necessary. The building was subsequently acquired by a developer, R&M Projects, which initiated a two-stage programme of works, which was carried out by Higgins Construction to a design by Alan Camp Architects at a total cost of £30 million. The first stage, relating to the area behind the town hall, involved the construction of three blocks of apartments and a separate library and community complex and was completed in November 2012. The second stage, relating to the town hall itself, involved the conversion of the ground floor into a doctor's surgery and the first floor into further apartments and was completed in summer 2014.
