= William Clowes (printer) =

English printer (1779–1847)

William Clowes (1 January 1779 – 26 January 1847) was a British printer who developed the use of steam-powered printing presses in the industry. He founded the printing firm that became William Clowes Ltd. in London in 1803.

Clowes was born in Chichester, Sussex, the eldest son of schoolteachers William Clowes and Elizabeth (née Harraden) Clowes. His father died when William was an infant, and he became a printer's apprentice at the age of 10.

In 1803, he moved to London and founded his own business in October 1803 at 20 Villiers Street, with just one employee. Through his wife's cousin, William Winchester, Clowes was able to gain access to government printing work which enabled the firm to develop rapidly, moving to Northumberland Court in 1807.

In 1823, Clowes installed a steam-powered printing press designed by Applegarth and Edward Cowper. His factory adjoined the palace of Britain's wealthiest man, the Duke of Northumberland, who successfully instituted a court action for noise and pollution abatement. In 1827, the firm took over Applegarth's premises in Duke Street, Blackfriars, a site which became the largest printing works in the world, printing a wide variety of works and employing over 500 workers directly.

The development of powered presses by Clowes is credited with increasing levels of accuracy as well as speed of output, making printed material cheaper and more accessible. He was also an innovator in terms of working practices and in 1820, became one of the first employers to start a benevolent fund for this workforce. He was a leading figure in the Society for the Diffusion of Useful Knowledge.

Clowes married Mary Winchester, the niece of William Winchester, in 1804 and had four daughters and four sons with her. Three of his sons, William, Winchester and George, ran the business which had become William Clowes and Sons in 1839. In 1824, Clowes was made a freeman of Chichester. He died in Marylebone in January 1847, aged 68, and was buried in West Norwood Cemetery.
