= Crayford =

Town in South East London, England

Coordinates: 51.4491°N 0.1812°E

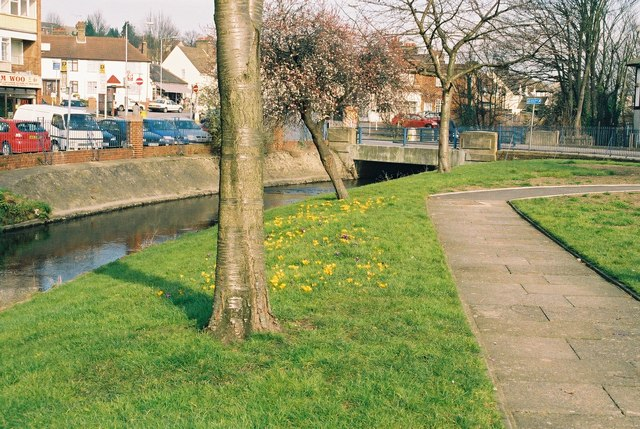

- Location within Greater London
- Population: 11,226 (2011 Census. Ward)
- OS grid reference: TQ515745
  - Charing Cross: 13.7 mi (22.0 km) WNW
- London borough: Bexley
- Ceremonial county: Greater London
- Region: London
- Country: England
- Sovereign state: United Kingdom
- Post town: DARTFORD
- Postcode district: DA1
- Dialling code: 01322
- Police: Metropolitan
- Fire: London
- Ambulance: London
- UK Parliament: Bexleyheath and Crayford
- London Assembly: Bexley and Bromley

Crayford is a town and electoral ward in South East London, England, within the London Borough of Bexley. It lies east of Bexleyheath and north west of Dartford. Crayford was in the historic county of Kent until 1965. The settlement developed by the river Cray, around a ford that is no longer used.

== History ==
An Iron Age settlement existed in the vicinity of the present St Paulinus Church between the Julian and Claudian invasions of Britain, from roughly 30 BC to AD 40. Roman ruins have been discovered and Crayford is one of several places proposed as the site of Noviomagus Cantiacorum, a place mentioned in the Antonine Itinerary as being on the Roman equivalent of the later Watling Street. Crayford is also plausible as the site of the bloody battle of Crecganford ("Creeksford") in 457 in which Hengist defeated Vortimer to become the supreme sovereign of Kent. The Anglo-Saxon Chronicle written around 400 years later describes how Hengist and Æsc defeated the "Brettas" at that battle.

Crayford is mentioned in the Domesday Book, which was compiled just prior to 1086, as a settlement within the Hundred of Litlelee with a church, three mills, and a relatively large population of 27 regular householders (villeins) and two smallholders. Its overlord was not a private individual or the king but Christ Church, Canterbury.

As a (civil/combined) parish (before 1920) it included the hamlets of Northend, Perry Street and Slade Green which lie to the north. In 1831, the population of the parish was 2022 people. For centuries it was strongly associated with brick-making, the printing of silk scarves, ties and calico cloths, and for a short period carpet-making.

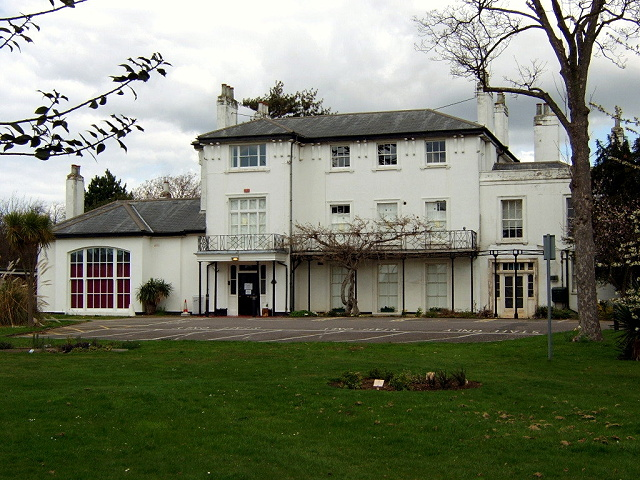
Crayford Manor House, reconstructed in 1816

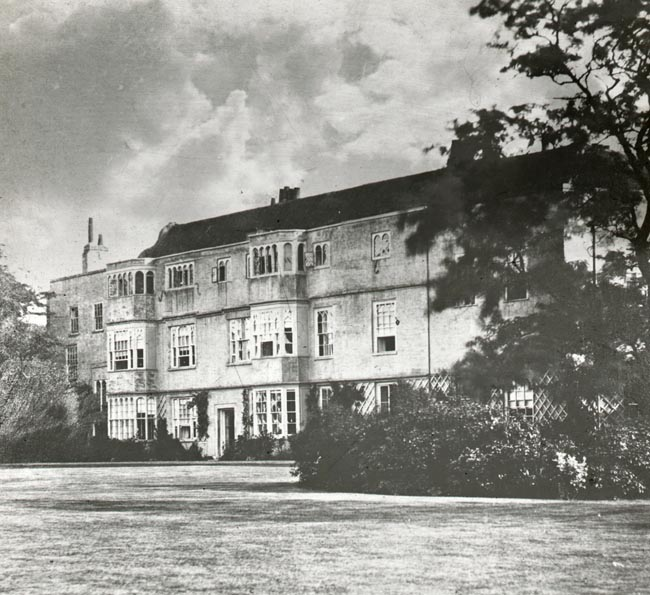
1887 photograph of May Place

There were two main Manor Houses in the area during the Middle Ages, Newbery Manor on the site of what is now Crayford Manor House, and Howbury Manor next to Slade Green. Roger Apylton had served Kings Henry V and Henry VI as auditor, and resided at Marshalls Court, Crayford. Late in the reign of Elizabeth I Henry Partich sold Newbery Manor to Henry Apylton of Marshalls Court, and Apylton built May Place close by. Hall Place, which lies alongside the River Cray, was built for Lord Mayor of the City of London, Sir John Champneis, in around 1537. There was also an Iron Mill, which was later replaced by a saw mill (in 1765), which produced the timber for the floor of Buckingham Palace. In 1551 Francis Goldsmith bought a 'Great tenement called The Place' next to the bridge in Crayford, and between 1556 and 1586 purchased substantial amounts of local farmland and the Old Bell Public House.

In 1623 most of the parish of Crayford was purchased by Merchant Taylor Robert Draper including Newbery Manor, Howbury Manor, Marshalls Court and May Place, where his family took up residence. Draper's wife Anne was the daughter of Thomas Harman who lived at Ellam House which subsequently passed to the Drapers. The ownerships subsequently passed to Robert Draper's son William, who was selected to be the Sheriff of the County of Kent but died in 1650 before taking office, and then to Robert's grandson, parliamentarian Cresheld Draper. On the death of Cresheld Draper in 1694, his heirs sold all the properties to Sir Cloudesley Shovell.

Crayford Manor House was rebuilt in the eighteenth century, at the time essentially a farmhouse until it was remodelled in 1816 for the Rev. Thomas Barne. Historic England state it was built piecemeal over several periods, with a porch and Italianate features being added to the 1816 building.

Other notable 19th-century local houses included Shenstone (built around 1828 and demolished 1974, the site is now Shenstone School, with Shenstone's former grounds now being Shenstone Park), Stoneyhurst (which became Stoneyhurst Convent High School and is now the site of St Catherine's Roman Catholic School for Girls), Martens Grove and Oakwood – the latter two designed by architect John Shaw Jr. and built by George Locke of builders Locke & Nesham with each occupying one of the houses.

=== Industrialisation ===
In 1819, the former saw mill site became a flour mill. Another major employer was the silk works set up by Augustus Applegath and later run by David Evans. The Maxim Nordenfeldt Gun and Ammunition Factory was also a major employer, until taken over by the Vickers Company in 1897. Vickers built military aeroplanes and armaments and became the dominant employer, building homes, a theatre and a canteen close to many workshops. The canteen (built during the First World War) was converted for use by the Crayford Urban District Council as Crayford Town Hall and is a locally listed building.

Another former major employer in Crayford was Dussek Brothers (part of Burmah-Castrol since the 1960s) who operated their oils and waxes blending business on Thames Road from around 1928 until the site was bought by BP and subsequently closed down in 2001. The entire site was demolished in early 2010. The David Evans silk works is another recent closure, in 2002.

In 1982 a housing cooperative was built at Craymill next to the A206 road.

== Demography ==
According to the 2011 census, 84% of the population is White British.

== Leisure ==
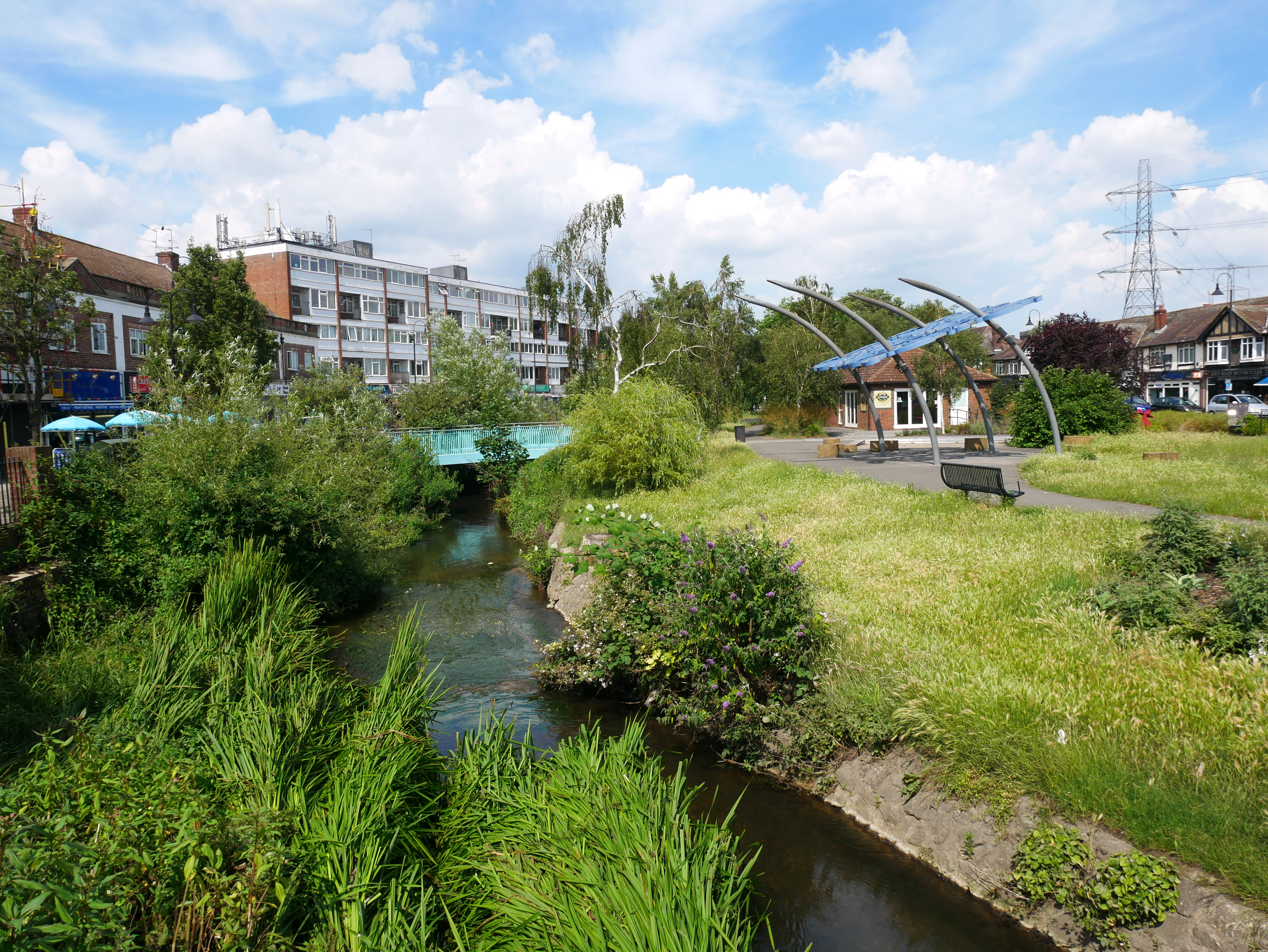
Crayford Gardens, with the River Cray running through it, lies in the centre of Crayford.

Crayford has a theatre and a greyhound racing track. The theatre was named in honour of Geoffrey Whitworth who played a key part in developing a British tradition of amateur drama and in building political support for The Royal National Theatre. The new Crayford Community Centre, located above the library, is the venue for many groups.

Nearby Hall Place is a scheduled monument lying between Crayford and Bexley. It has gardens with the River Cray running through and a plant nursery, a cafe and restaurant plus the silkworks shop.

The large Sainsbury's supermarket situated next to the greyhound stadium was claimed by Sainsbury's to be the world first's use of technology which heats the store using natural energy captured through boreholes buried hundreds of metres beneath the ground and was at the time of its expansion (2010) the largest Sainsbury's in England.

The Tower Retail Park is opposite Crayford Town Hall.

The High Street is partly one-way for motor traffic.

=== Sport ===
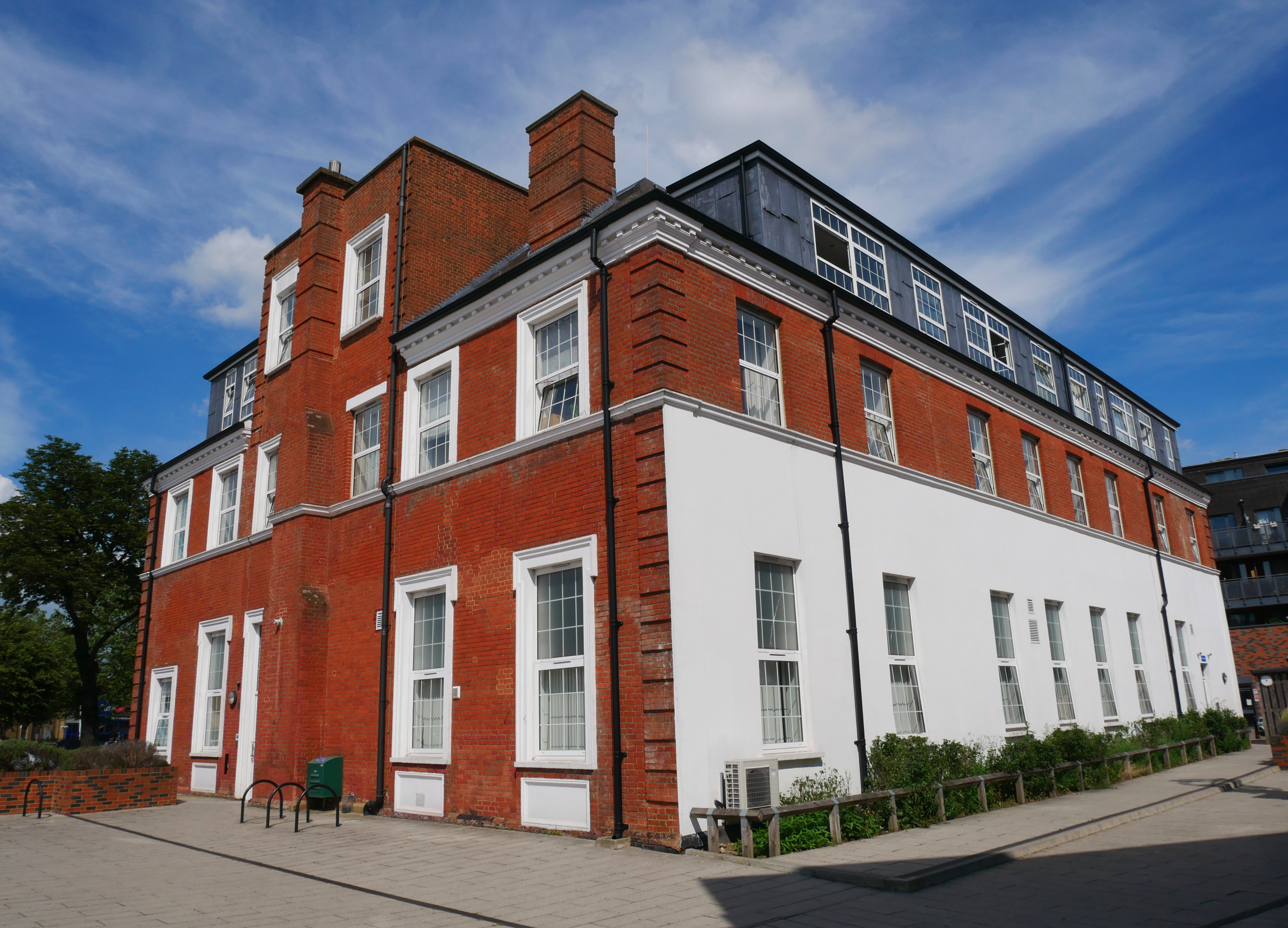
Crayford Town Hall

- VCD Athletic Football Club compete in the Isthmian League Premier Division ('VCD' stands for Vickers, Crayford and Dartford). They play at Oakwood stadium, on Old Road, Crayford, which they share with Kent Football United
- Crayford Arrows Sports Club is a local football team, established in 1981
- Speedway racing was staged at Crayford Greyhound Stadium. The team raced in the inaugural 1968 British League Division Two as the Highwaymen before closing down. In later years the sport was revived and the team were known as the Kestrels. The track subsequently closed and the team moved to Hackney Stadium in East London

== Education ==
- Secondary schools in the area include Haberdashers' Crayford Academy

== Places of worship ==
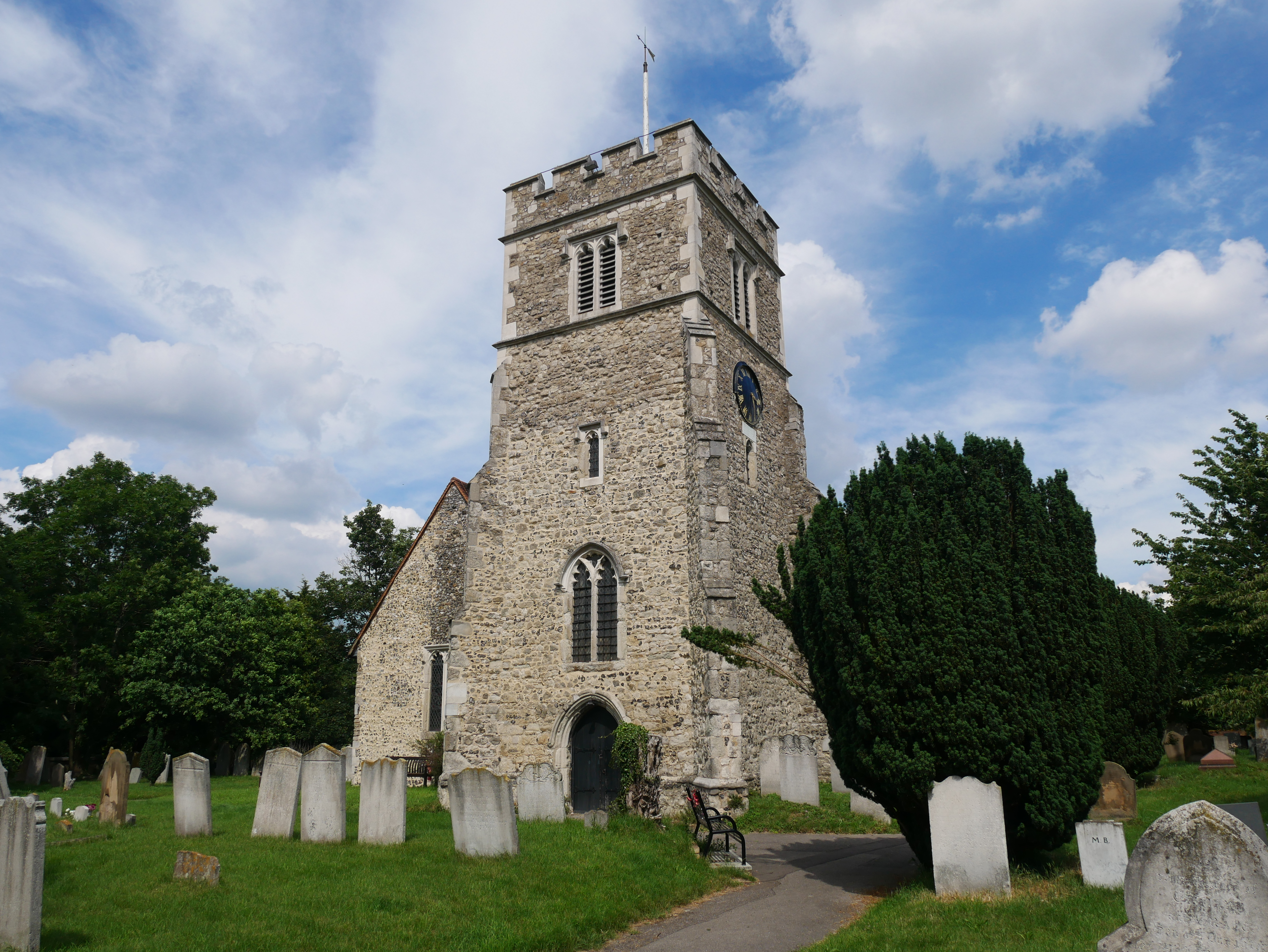
St Paulinus Church, as seen from the southwest

- Acts 2 Church Crayford, Haberdashers' Aske's Academy, Iron Mill Lane
- Crayford Baptist Church, Bexley Lane
- St Paulinus Church (Anglican), Manor Road
- St Mary of the Crays Catholic Church, Old Road
- Crayford Mosque, Crayford High Street

== Locality ==
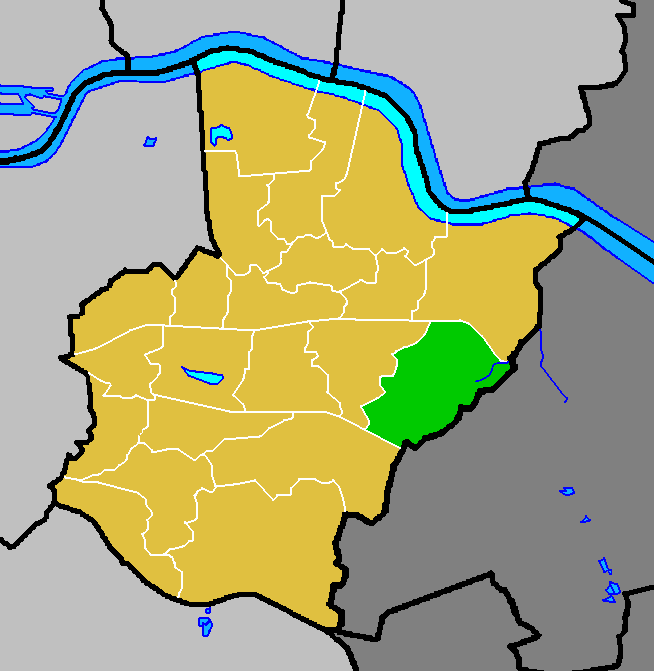
Crayford ward (green) within the London Borough of Bexley (yellow)

=== Nearest places ===
- Bexleyheath
- Dartford
- Barnes Cray
- Slade Green
- Barnehurst
- Erith
- Bexley

== Transport ==
=== Rail ===
Crayford railway station connects the town with Southeastern services to London Charing Cross via Sidcup, London Cannon Street via Sidcup and Lewisham, London Cannon Street via Woolwich Arsenal and Greenwich, Dartford and Gravesend.

=== Buses ===
Crayford is served by three Transport for London bus services.

- 96 to Woolwich via Bexleyheath and Welling, and to Bluewater via Dartford
- 428 to Erith and to Bluewater via Dartford
- 492 to Sidcup via Bexleyheath and to Bluewater via Dartford

== Notable residents ==
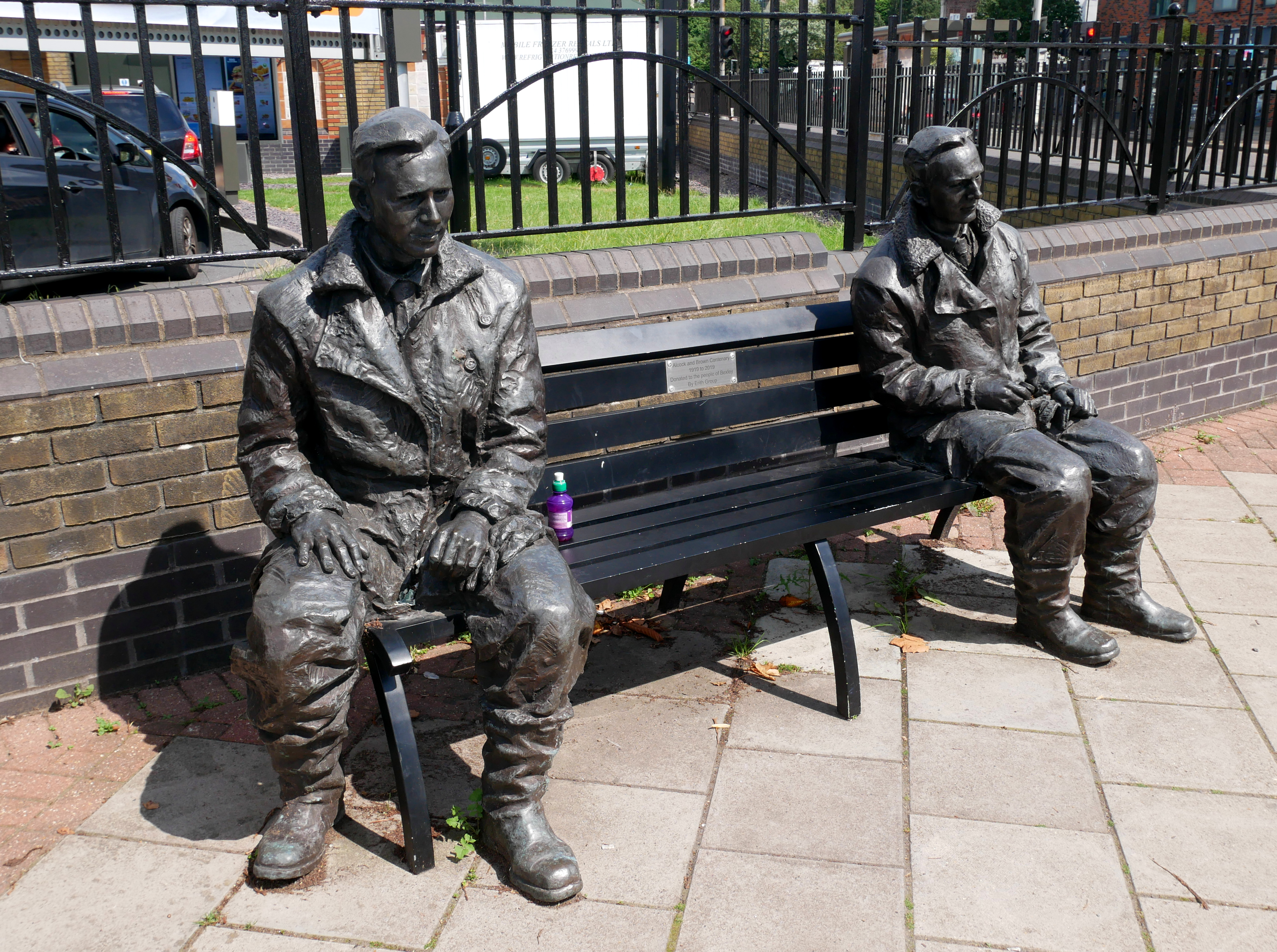
A sculpture of Alcock and Brown near the location of the (demolished) Vickers factory in Crayford

- Semi Ajayi, footballer who plays for West Bromwich Albion and the Nigeria national football team
- Augustus Applegath, inventor who built Shenstone House
- Thomas Bevan, soldier and played first-class cricket for the British Army cricket team
- Algernon Blackwood, author, journalist and broadcaster, lived in Crayford Manor House between 1871 and 1880
- William Claiborne, surveyor of Jamestown in the Virginia Colony and established the first permanent European settlement in Maryland
- George Green, footballer
- Thomas Harman, author who resided in Crayford from 1547
- Henry Nuttall, cricketer
- Keith and Gavin Peacock, father and son footballers.
- Cloudesley Shovell, admiral who lived at May Place between 1694 and 1707
- Frederick Currie, lived at the Manor House, May Place
- Hiram Maxim, inventor, lived at Stoneyhurst from 1884 until 1889
- Derek Ufton, played cricket for Kent and football for Charlton Athletic
- Jack Wall, inventor of the Crayford focuser
