= Edward Cowper =

English printing engineer, inventor and academic

Edward Shickle Cowper
- Born: 1790
- Died: October 17, 1852; Kensington, London, England
- Occupations: Printing engineer, inventor, academic
- Employer: King's College London
- Known for: Improvements to the steam printing press; printing machinery
- Relatives: Ebenezer Cowper (brother)

Edward Shickle Cowper (1790–1852) was an English printing engineer, inventor, and academic.

== Life ==
Cowper went into partnership as a printer with his brother-in-law, Augustus Applegath, around 1813, when their employer William Cornish died. A proposal to print banknotes for the Bank of England fell through. Their printing business in Duke Street, Stamford Street, London was then acquired by William Clowes, and they concentrated on machine-making. The partnership, or, according to William Savage in his Dictionary of the Art of Printing, Applegath alone, was employed by The Times to improve their presses.

For many years Edward was in partnership with his brother Ebenezer, and the machines of Messrs. E. & E. Cowper were used throughout Europe. Ebenezer (1804–1880) carried on the practical part of the business.

Towards the end of his life Edward Cowper was professor of manufacturing art and mechanics at King's College London. He died at Kensington 17 October 1852, in his sixty-third year.

== Innovations ==
Cowper was the improver of the steam printing machine, projected by William Nicholson and implemented by Friedrich Koenig.

In 1816, when he described himself as an ironmonger and mechanist of Newington Butts, Cowper obtained a patent (No. 3974) for "a method of printing paper for paper-hangings and other purposes", with curved stereotype plates fixed on cylinders for printing long rolls of paper. In 1818, styling himself as a printer, he patented (No. 4194) certain improvements in printing, which consisted of a method for a better distribution of the ink, and an improved manner of conveying the sheets from one cylinder to another. This was the origin of the "perfecting machine" which printed on both sides of the paper at once. Cowper did not invent the soft composition for distributing the ink, which superseded the old pelt-balls in hand-presses, but devised the system of forming it into rollers.

In 1827 Applegath and Cowper jointly invented the four-cylinder machine, which Applegath erected for The Times, superseding Koenig's machine. The rate of printing was five thousand an hour, a large improvement. Edward and Ebenezer Cowper also invented a cylinder card-printing machine.

He was awarded the Telford Medal in silver for 1849/50 for work on printing presses ['On Printing Machines' ] – one of ten awarded for that session, all in silver.
