= Haberdashers' Crayford Academy =

Haberdashers' Crayford
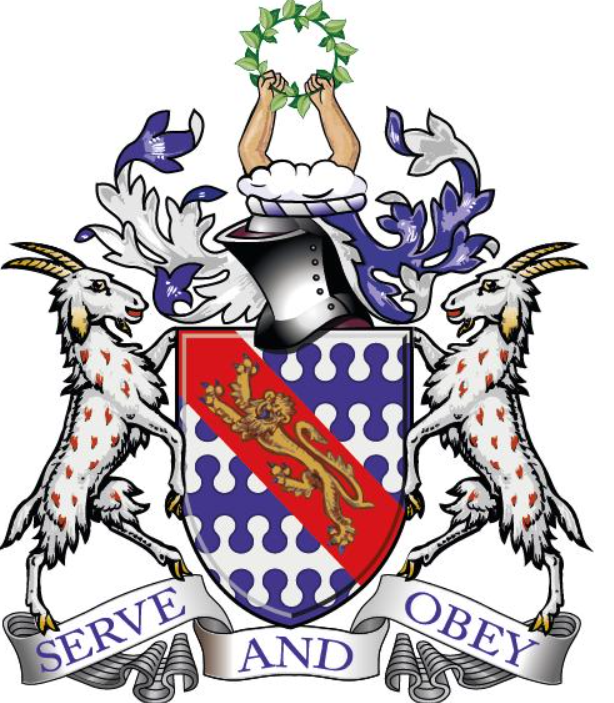
- Coat of arms of the Haberdashers' Company

Location
- Iron Mill Lane; Crayford; Greater London, DA1 4RS; England; 51.45681°N 0.18929°E

Information
- Type: Academy
- Established: 2009
- Local authority: Bexley
- Specialist: Music College
- Department for Education URN: 135951 Tables
- Ofsted: Reports
- Principal: Steve Wheatley
- Gender: Co-educational
- Age: 11 to 18
- Website: https://www.habscrayford.org.uk/

Haberdashers' Crayford Academy (formerly Haberdashers' Aske's Crayford Academy) is a co-educational secondary school and sixth form with academy status sponsored by the Worshipful Company of Haberdashers. It is located in the Crayford area of the London Borough of Bexley, England.

The school was opened in 2009, and is located on the site of the old Barnes Cray Primary School. It is a girls' and boys' school.

Their head teacher is currently Steve Wheatley as of 25/06/2025, and before that was Jenna tolls, 06/07/15-4/1/2024

Originally an all-through school for pupils aged 3 to 18, in 2013 Slade Green Junior School was absorbed into Crayford Academy with the school then being based over two sites. In 2019 the primary school provision of the school was formally split, forming two new primary schools: Haberdashers' Aske's Crayford Temple Grove (next to the original school) and Haberdashers' Aske's Slade Green Temple Grove on the former Slade Green Junior School site. Haberdashers' Aske's Crayford Academy continues as a secondary school for pupils aged 11 to 18.

In September 2021 the school dropped the 'Aske's' from its title following controversy over the legacy of Robert Aske.
