= Sibay (disambiguation) =

Sibay is a town in the Republic of Bashkortostan, Russia.

Sibay may also refer to:

- Sibay Urban Okrug, a municipal formation which the town of republic significance of Sibay in the Republic of Bashkortostan, Russia is incorporated as
- Sibay Airport, an airport in the Republic of Bashkortostan, Russia
- Sibay Island, an island in Philippines where the US ship Patrick Henry wrecked in 1923
