= Alesia =

Alesia may refer to:

== Places ==
=== France ===
- Alesia (city), an ancient city in Gaul
- Alésia station, a Paris Metro station
- Rue d'Alésia, Paris
- Le quartier Alésia, an unofficial district of Paris that mostly overlaps Petit-Montrouge

=== United States ===
- Alesia (Broussard, Louisiana), listed on the NRHP
- Alesia, Maryland, an unincorporated community

== People ==
- Alesia Fieldberg, Canadian television journalist and beauty pageant winner
- Alesia Furs (1925–2017), member of the Belarusian independence movement
- Alesia Garcia (born 2000), American soccer player
- Alésia Glidewell, American web series director, producer and voice actress
- Alesia Graf (1980–2024), German boxer
- Alesia Holliday, American author
- Alesia Raut, Indian-Russian model, VJ, and fashion choreographer
- Alesia Stepaniuk (born 1985), Russian Paralympic judoka
- Alesia Turava (born 1979), Belarusian middle-distance runner
- Alesia Zaitsava (born 1985), Belarusian badminton player

== Ships ==
- SS Alesia (1882), a French ocean liner in service from 1882 until 1899
- SS Alesia (1896), a German steamship that was called Bangalore until 1897
- SS La Bretagne, a French ocean liner that was renamed Alesia in 1919
- SS Prinz Adalbert, a German steamship renamed Alesia in 1917

== Other uses ==
- Battle of Alesia
- "Alesia", a song by Swiss folk metal band Eluveitie on their 2012 album Helvetios
- "Alésia", a 2011 album by French synth-pop band Housse de Racket
- "Alesia", an electronic music group signed to Owsla and Ultra Records
- Caesar (board game), a board game originally published under the name Alesia

== See also ==
- Alesya (disambiguation)
- Alessia
- Olesya (given name)
