= Gadelsha Falls =

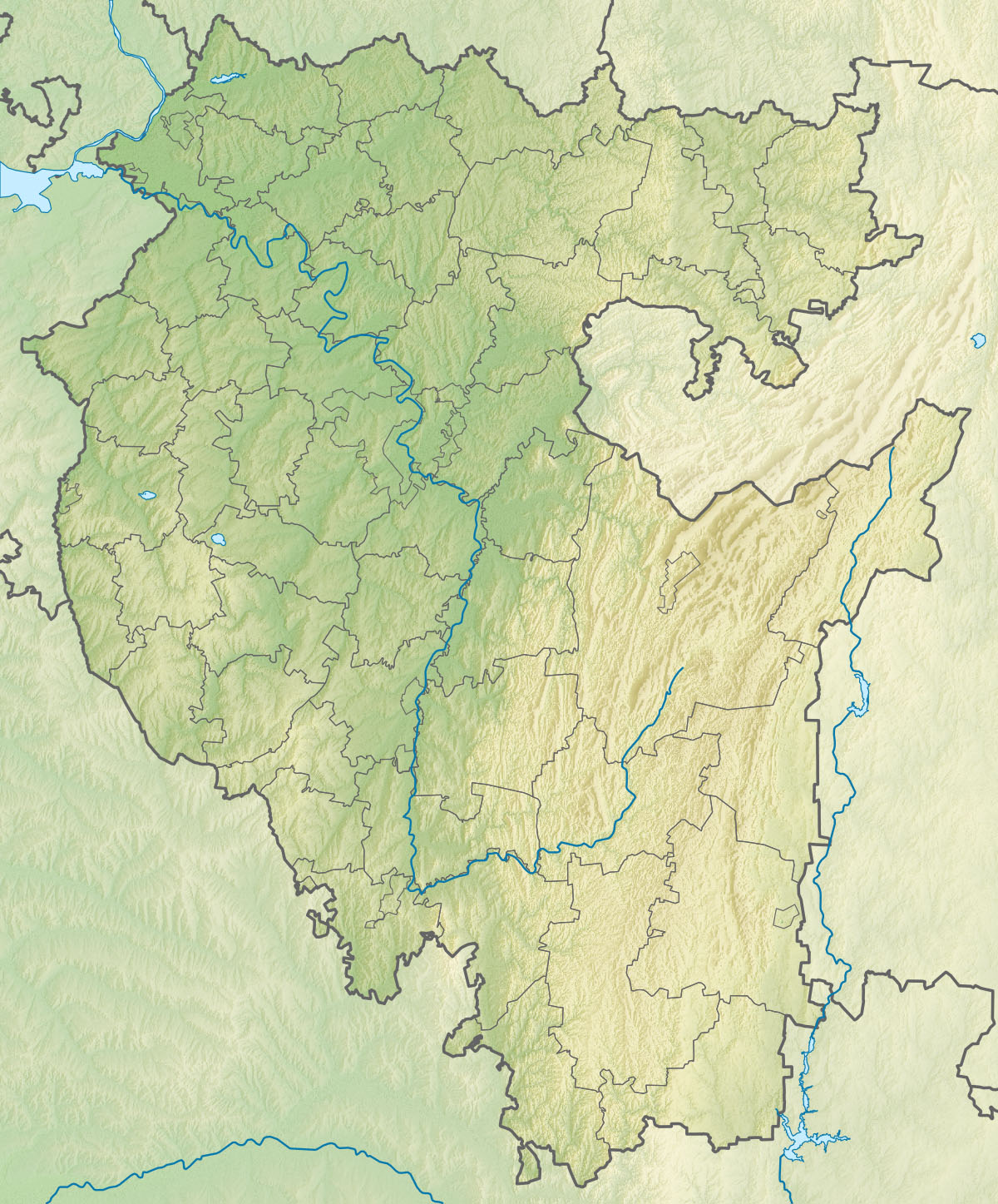
- Location within Bashkortostan Location within Russia
- Location: Russia, Bashkortostan
- Coordinates: 52°45′27″N 58°22′20″E
- Total height: 15 m (49 ft)
- Number of drops: 10< l/s

Gadelsha Falls (Russian: Гадельша, from Bashkir language Ғәҙелша, "Ибраһим") is a 15-m-high cascade waterfall in Russia. It is located on the Khudolas River in the Baymaksky District, Republic of Bashkortostan. Khudolas River starts from a spring near the Yaman-Tash mountain and flows along the eastern slope of the Irenyk ridge. The distance from the waterfall to Sibai is 15 km. The Gadelsha waterfall is the highest waterfall in Bashkortostan and has been a natural monument since 1965. It is protected by the state as a unique monument of nature. It has several names: Ibragimovsky, Tuyalas, Khudolas. But still the most common is Gadelsha, a name from a nearby village of the same name.

The waterfall is three-stage, the total height is more than 15 m. The upper cascade has a height of 1.2 m, the second and third steps are about 7 m high each. The water flow rate of the waterfall varies depending on the amount of precipitation. In summer, during dry times, it is only about 10 L / s, but in the spring the waterfall is a majestic sight. The best time to visit the waterfall is spring when there is a lot of water. In the area of the waterfall, various jasper and jasper species are widely distributed, of great interest as valuable ornamental stones known throughout the world.

Around the waterfall you can find rare disappearing plants. This is one of the most favorite places for tourists to visit.

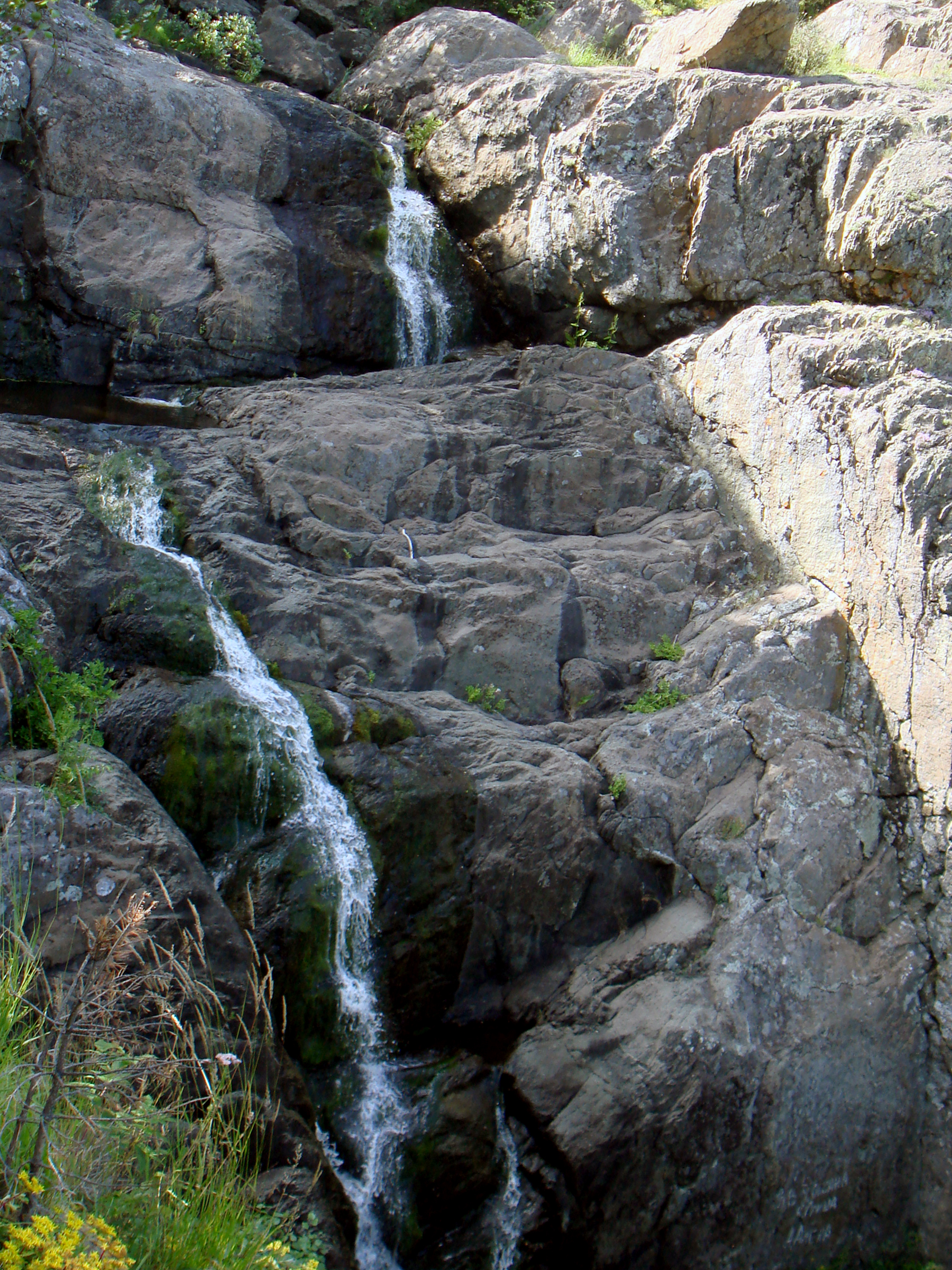
Upper stage

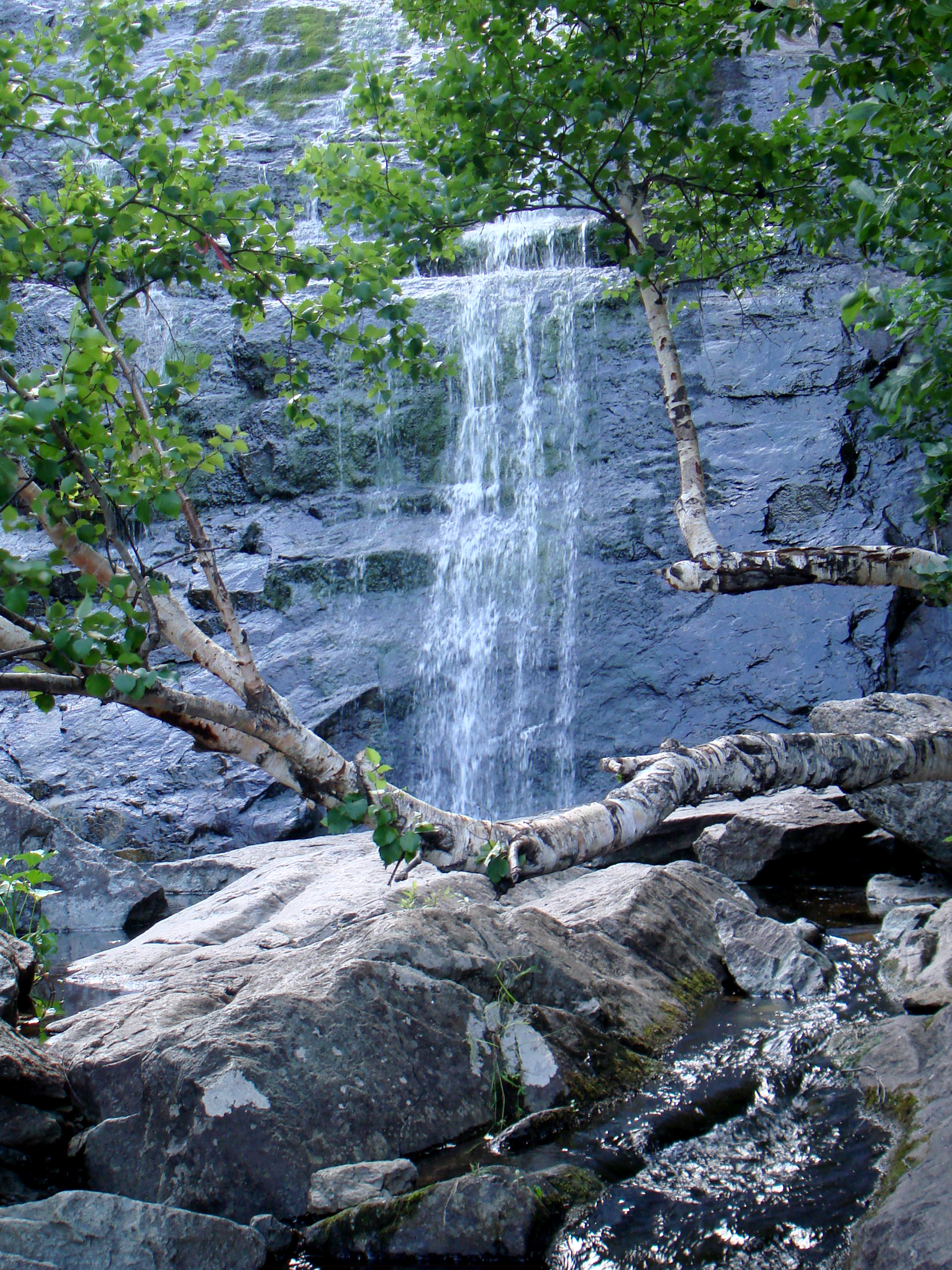
Lower step
