= Erith Town Hall =

Municipal building in London, England

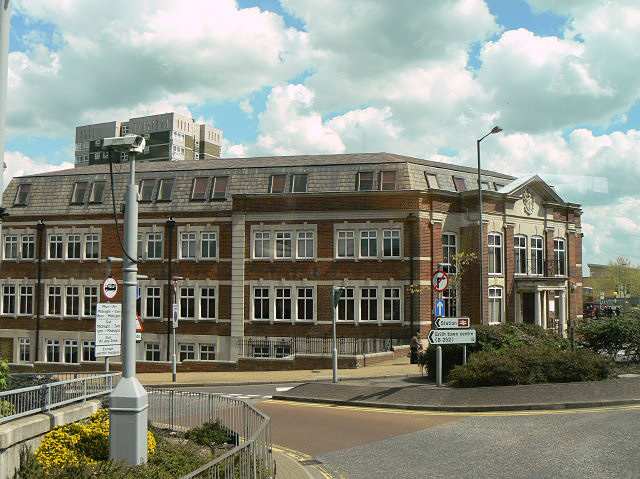
- Erith Town Hall

- Shown in Bexley
- 51.4808°N 0.1779°E
- Location: Erith

History
- Built: 1932

Site notes
- Architect: Harold Hind
- Architectural style: Italian Renaissance style

Erith Town hall is a municipal building in Walnut Tree Road, Erith, south east London. It is a locally listed building.

== History ==
In the late 19th century Erith Urban District Council had been based at council offices in the High Street. After civic leaders found that this arrangement was inadequate for their needs, they decided to move to a former private residence known as Walnut Tree House in Walnut Tree Road in 1902. (Note: Walnut Tree House had originally been bought from the Parish family to facilitate the Erith Tramways project; it was used as an annex to the Erith Sanatorium in Belmont Road from 1900 to 1902.) By the late 1920s, Walnut Tree House had also become inadequate and it was demolished to make way for the current structure in 1931.

The new building, which was designed by Harold Hind, the council surveyor, in the Italian Renaissance style, was officially opened on 2 June 1932. The design involved a symmetrical main frontage with five bays on the corner of Walnut Tree Road and Bexley Road; the central section featured a portico flanked by Doric order columns on the ground floor; there was a balcony and two windows on the first floor with a pediment above bearing the town's coat of arms. The building became the headquarters of the Municipal Borough of Erith when the area was awarded municipal borough status in 1938.

The building remained the local seat of government of the enlarged London Borough of Bexley when it was formed in 1965 (and Erith seceded from the administrative county of Kent) but the new council only used Erith Town Hall briefly, choosing instead to move to new Civic Offices on the south side of the Broadway in Bexleyheath in 1980. Erith Town Hall was expanded by the addition of an extra floor in the early 1990s, in anticipation of becoming the home for Capita staff who took over responsibility for processing council revenues and housing benefits in 1996. This outsourcing arrangement was extended in 2011 and again in 2019. The building was briefly evacuated after a suspicious package was found in the mail in November 2019.
