= Alesya =

Alesya may refer to:

- Alesya (singer), Belarusian singer
- Alesya Kuznetsova (born 1992), Russian judoka
- "Alesya", a 1974 song by Belarusian band Pesniary
- A Belarusian-language diminutive of the given name Aleksandra

== See also ==
- Alesia (disambiguation)
- Olesya (given name), the Russian and Ukrainian-language equivalent of Alesya
