= Lesia =

Lesia is a feminine given name and a Ukrainian diminutive form of the first names Larissa or Olesya. Notable people with the name include:

- Lesia Dychko (born 1939), Ukrainian music educator and composer
- Lesia Liss (born 1966), American politician
- Lesia Tsurenko (born 1989), Ukrainian tennis player
- Lesia Valadzenkava (born 1991), Belarusian ice dancer
- Lesia Vasylenko (born 1987), Ukrainian lawyer and politician

Other uses:

- Lesia, a genus of plants in the family Gesneriaceae
- LESIA, a French space and astrophysics instrumentation research laboratory
