= List of shipwrecks in 1923 =

The list of shipwrecks in 1923 includes ships sunk, foundered, grounded, or otherwise lost during 1923.

table of contents
1923
Jan	Feb	Mar	Apr
May	Jun	Jul	Aug
Sep	Oct	Nov	Dec
Unknown date

== October ==
=== 1 October ===
List of shipwrecks: 1 October 1923
Ship	State	Description
Troutpool	United Kingdom	The cargo ship was wrecked off Saint-Pierre, Saint Pierre and Miquelon.
Yport	France	The cargo ship ran aground at Sydney, Nova Scotia, and was a total loss. Her crew were rescued.

=== 2 October ===
List of shipwrecks: 2 October 1923
Ship	State	Description
Electric Flash	United Kingdom	The schooner was driven ashore at Renews, Newfoundland, and was a total loss.
Helen Swazy	United Kingdom	The schooner caught fire and was abandoned in the Atlantic Ocean at 39°40′N 70°44′W. All eight crew were rescued by Garonne (flag unknown).
L'Auroch	France	The cargo ship was driven ashore at Saint-Pierre, Saint Pierre and Miquelon, and was abandoned by her crew.
Lizzie Trenberth	United Kingdom	The schooner, which had departed from Runcorn, Cheshire, on 24 September for Mevagissey, Cornwall, was last reported on this date. No further trace, presumed foundered with the loss of all hands.

=== 3 October ===
List of shipwrecks: 3 October 1923
Ship	State	Description
Adrana	Germany	The cargo ship ran aground and sank on Storkallegrund, Sweden.
Evelyn	United Kingdom	The ketch was reported in the English Channel 10 nautical miles (19 km) south east of the Royal Sovereign Lightship (United Kingdom). No further trace, presumed foundered with the loss of all hands.
Governor Parr	United Kingdom	the schooner sprang a leak and was abandoned in the Atlantic Ocean (42°49′30″N 55°56′00″W) with the loss of two of her eight crew. Survivors were rescued by Schodak (United States).

=== 4 October ===
List of shipwrecks: 4 October 1923
Ship	State	Description
Stuartstar	United Kingdom	The cargo ship ran aground at Hook of Holland (Rotterdam), Netherlands. Forty-nine of her 51 crew were taken off the next day. She was declared a total loss on 10 October.

=== 7 October ===
List of shipwrecks: 7 October 1923
Ship	State	Description
Else	flag unknown	The schooner capsized in the Gulf of Finland 4 nautical miles (7.4 km) west of Sommers, Finland. Her crew were rescued by Colinton (United Kingdom).

=== 8 October ===
List of shipwrecks: 8 October 1923
Ship	State	Description
City of Westminster	United Kingdom	The cargo ship ran aground on the Runnelstone, Cornwall. All 48 people on board were rescued by the Penlee and Sennen Cove Lifeboats.
Kennecott	United States	During a voyage from Cordova, Territory of Alaska, to Seattle, Washington, carrying a crew of 31 and a cargo of 6,000 tons of copper ore concentrates and 40,000 cases of salmon, the 3,620-ton cargo ship was wrecked without loss of life at Hunter Point on Graham Island in the Queen Charlotte Islands off the coast of British Columbia. The cutter USCGC Unalga ( United States Coast Guard), the survey ship USC&GS Surveyor ( United States Coast and Geodetic Survey), and the steamer Cordova (flag unknown) rescued 23 members of her crew. Her captain and seven other members of her crew remained behind to guard her wreck and were rescued later by the salvage tug Hercules (flag unknown). Kennecott soon broke up, and the two main parts of her hull drifted away and sank.
Norman W. Strong	United Kingdom	The schooner ran aground in the Saint Lawrence River and was wrecked.

=== 9 October ===
List of shipwrecks: 9 October 1923
Ship	State	Description
John S. Emery	United States	The barquentine was abandoned in the Atlantic Ocean. Her crew were rescued by Samland (Belgium).
Vital	Germany	The cargo ship collided with Sekstant (Norway) at Hull, Yorkshire and sank.

=== 10 October ===
List of shipwrecks: 10 October 1923
Ship	State	Description
Bretagne	Denmark	The cargo ship ran aground on Häfringe Island, Sweden with the loss of her captain. The survivors were rescued.
Lutzen	flag unknown	The cargo ship departed Saint John, New Brunswick, for Havana, Cuba. No further trace, presumed foundered with the loss of all hands.
USS PG-40	United States Navy	The PG-40/Quiros-class gunboat was sunk as a target.

=== 11 October ===
List of shipwrecks: 11 October 1923
Ship	State	Description
City of Everett	United States	The cargo ship caught fire and foundered in the Gulf of Mexico with the loss of all 26 crew.
Montoro	United Kingdom	The cargo ship ran aground in the Torres Straits.
Omono Maru	Japan	The cargo ship was wrecked off Taneichi, Iwate.
Phoeniciër	Belgium	The cargo ship ran aground at Memel, East Prussia, Germany. Her crew were rescued. She was refloated on 4 May 1924, but was declared a constructive total loss. She was sold, repaired and returned to service.

=== 12 October ===
List of shipwrecks: 12 October 1923
Ship	State	Description
Agram	United States	After her anchor lines parted during a violent storm, the 22-gross register ton motor cannery tender was wrecked in Cook Inlet on the south-central coast of the Territory of Alaska on a beach in the vicinity of 59°16′N 154°07′W, between Cape Chinik and Amakdedori. Her crew of three survived.

=== 13 October ===
List of shipwrecks: 13 October 1923
Ship	State	Description
Aberdeen	Canada	The Canadian Government ship (CGS) ran aground on Black Ledge, Seal Island, Nova Scotia and was abandoned.
Cetus	United States	The cargo ship collided with another vessel in Lake Michigan and sank. Her crew were rescued.
Port Arthur	United Kingdom	The schooner collided with Howard Young (United Kingdom) at St. John's, Newfoundland, and sank.

=== 14 October ===
List of shipwrecks: 14 October 1923
Ship	State	Description
Carlisle	United States	The 15-gross register ton, 43.9-foot (13.4 m) fishing vessel was wrecked on the coast of Gravina Island in the Alexander Archipelago in Southeast Alaska. The two people aboard survived.

=== 15 October ===
List of shipwrecks: 15 October 1923
Ship	State	Description
Jean Macdonald Duff	United Kingdom	The schooner was abandoned and set afire in the Atlantic Ocean (42°28′N 24°43′W). Her crew were rescued by Arawa (United Kingdom).
Mabel	flag unknown	The four-masted schooner was abandoned in the Atlantic Ocean off Nassau, Bahamas.
Seine	France	The cargo ship collided with Andalusia (Germany) in the Kaiser Wilhelm Canal, Germany and sank. She was refloated on 17 October.

=== 16 October ===
List of shipwrecks: 16 October 1923
Ship	State	Description
Egon	Sweden	The cargo ship struck a mine in the Baltic Sea 10 nautical miles (19 km) south of the Äransgrund Lighthouse and sank. Her crew were rescued by a German ship.
Kaduskak	United Kingdom	The auxiliary sailing vessel was destroyed by fire at St. Martins, New Brunswick.
USS Quiros	United States Navy	United States Navy destroyer gunfire sank the decommissioned gunboat as a target off the coast of China.

=== 17 October ===
List of shipwrecks: 17 October 1923
Ship	State	Description
Strathmore	United Kingdom	The Thames barge collided with Lapwing (United Kingdom) in the River Thames at Erith, Kent and sank.
Ville de Reims	France	The cargo ship came ashore between Noissi-Bé and Diego Suarez, Madagascar. She was refloated on 22 October. She was refloated on 23 October.

=== 18 October ===
List of shipwrecks: 18 October 1923
Ship	State	Description
Etoile D'Anjouan	France	The cargo ship ran aground on Nosyfaty Island, Madagascar, whilst going to the assistance of Ville de Reims (France). She was refloated on 23 October.
General Smuts	United Kingdom	The cargo ship ran aground at Port Eads, Louisiana, United States.
Portuense	Portugal	The sailing vessel caught fire and was abandoned in the Atlantic Ocean (39°00′N 33°49′W). Her crew were rescued by Presidente Wilson (United Kingdom).
Spider	United States	With no one aboard, the 7-gross register ton, 30.6-foot (9.3 m) fishing vessel was blown ashore during a gale and wrecked without loss of life on "Caroline Island" – probably Carolyn Island (64°27′N 162°53′W) – in Golovnin Bay on the Bering Sea coast of the Territory of Alaska.

=== 19 October ===
List of shipwrecks: 19 October 1923
Ship	State	Description
Agatoelo	Italy	The cargo ship struck a mine in the Gulf of İzmir off Karaburun, Turkey, and sank with the loss of eight crew.

=== 20 October ===
List of shipwrecks: 20 October 1923
Ship	State	Description
Polmanter	United Kingdom	The cargo ship ran aground at Porto, Portugal.

=== 21 October ===
List of shipwrecks: 21 October 1923
Ship	State	Description
Leonor	France	The schooner sank in the Atlantic Ocean off Corvo Island, Azores, Portugal. Her crew were rescued.

=== 22 October ===
List of shipwrecks: 22 October 1923
Ship	State	Description
Fernhill	United Kingdom	The cargo ship collided with Port Auckland (United Kingdom) in the Elbe at Blankenese, Germany and sank. She was refloated on 13 December.
San Gil	United States	The passenger ship ran aground on Old Providence Island, Colombia. Her passengers were taken off by Pastores (United States).
Saxon Prince	United Kingdom	The cargo ship caught fire at Santos, São Paulo, Brazil and was beached. She was refloated on 24 October.

=== 23 October ===
List of shipwrecks: 23 October 1923
Ship	State	Description
O-5	United States Navy	USS O-5, 30 October 1923 The O-class submarine was rammed and sunk in Bahía Limón by Abangarez (United States) with the loss of three crew. She was partially raised on 30 October to enable the rescue of two survivors. Subsequently stricken in April 1924 and sold for scrap.

=== 24 October ===
List of shipwrecks: 24 October 1923
Ship	State	Description
Wm S. McDonald	United Kingdom	The three-masted schooner caught fire in the Atlantic Ocean 16 nautical miles (30 km) off Sandy Hook, New Jersey. All seven crew were rescued by San manuel (United Kingdom).

=== 25 October ===
List of shipwrecks: 25 October 1923
Ship	State	Description
Karin	Sweden	The auxiliary sailing vessel caught fire in the Øresund and was beached at Klampenborg, Denmark.

=== 27 October ===
List of shipwrecks: 27 October 1923
Ship	State	Description
Conovium	United Kingdom	The coaster, which had departed Garston, Lancashire for Dundalk, County Louth, Ireland on 26 October, was reported 10 nautical miles (19 km) south west of the Chicken Rock, Isle of Man. She subsequently foundered in the Irish Sea with the loss of all hands. The bodies of the crew washed up on the coast of Cumberland in late November.
Raven	France	The schooner ran aground at Swansea, Glamorgan, United Kingdom and was wrecked. Her five crew were rescued by Charlie Medland ( Royal National Lifeboat Institution).

=== 29 October ===
List of shipwrecks: 29 October 1923
Ship	State	Description
Borgneuf	France	The cargo ship ran aground at Arcachon, Gironde. She was refloated on 12 November.
Delfin	United Kingdom	The schooner caught fire and sank at Alexandria, Egypt.
Steelville	United Kingdom	The cargo ship ran aground in the Strait of Kertch. She was refloated on 6 November.
26	Imperial Japanese Navy	The Type L submarine sank at Kure Naval Base. Her crew were rescued. She was refloated on 2 November.

=== 31 October ===
List of shipwrecks: 31 October 1923
Ship	State	Description
Shinmei Maru	Japan	The cargo ship collided with Kasuga Maru (Japan) at Shimonoseki and sank.

=== Unknown date ===
List of shipwrecks: Unknown date 1923
Ship	State	Description
Black Cat	United Kingdom	The schooner foundered on a voyage from Runcorn, Cheshire to Falmouth, Cornwall with the loss of all hands.
Mary Manson Gruener	United States	The schooner foundered in the Atlantic Ocean. Her cre were rescued by Isabella (United States) and landed at Philadelphia, Pennsylvania on 5 October.

== November ==
=== 1 November ===
List of shipwrecks: 1 November 1923
Ship	State	Description
Shinshu Maru	Japan	The cargo ship collided with Kanei Naru (Japan) in the South China Sea off the north east coast of Korea and sank with some loss of life.

=== 2 November ===
List of shipwrecks: 2 November 1923
Ship	State	Description
General J. B. Carr	United States	The cargo ship was destroyed by fire and sank at New York.

=== 3 November ===
List of shipwrecks: 3 November 1923
Ship	State	Description
Success	United Kingdom	The coaster ran aground at Peterhead, Aberdeenshire. She was refloated on 4 November and brought into the harbour where she sank.

=== 4 November ===
List of shipwrecks: 4 November 1923
Ship	State	Description
Domino	United Kingdom	The cargo ship ran aground off the Hombursund Lighthouse, Norway. Her crew were rescued. She broke in two, and was a total loss.

=== 5 November ===
List of shipwrecks: 5 November 1923
Ship	State	Description
Equator	United Kingdom	The sailing ship departed from Trinidad. No further trace, presumed foundered with the loss of all hands.
Tainan Maru	Japan	The cargo ship collided with Itsukushima Maru (Japan) in the Inland Sea of Japan and was beached. She was later refloated and brought into Kobe.

=== 6 November ===
List of shipwrecks: 6 November 1923
Ship	State	Description
Perun	Germany	The cargo ship foundered in the Atlantic Ocean off the coast of Portugal. Her crew were rescued by Wolf (Germany).

=== 7 November ===
List of shipwrecks: 7 November 1923
Ship	State	Description
Conifer	United Kingdom	The cargo ship collided with Skogstad (Norway) in the Thames Estuary at Tilbury, Essex. She was beached but subsequently foundered.

=== 9 November ===
List of shipwrecks: 9 November 1923
Ship	State	Description
Castleisland	United Kingdom	The coaster came ashore in Belfast Lough and was wrecked. Her crew were rescued by the Donaghadee Lifeboat.
Goole	United Kingdom	The cargo ship collided with Wynding (United Kingdom) in the River Humber. She was taken to Hull where she sank.
Merche	Spain	The cargo ship sprang a leak in the Atlantic Ocean (30°59′N 11°00′W) and was abandoned. Her crew were rescued by Indiana (Italy).

=== 10 November ===
List of shipwrecks: 10 November 1923
Ship	State	Description
Martin Eduard	Latvia	The ship sprang a leak in the Baltic Sea off Gotland, Sweden and was abandoned.

=== 11 November ===
List of shipwrecks: 11 November 1923
Ship	State	Description
Hsin Lee	China	The cargo ship ran aground near Yalukiang. She was refloated on 25 November.

=== 12 November ===
List of shipwrecks: 12 November 1923
Ship	State	Description
Helios	flag unknown	The salvage vessel sank off Pihlajasaari, Finland.

=== 13 November ===
List of shipwrecks: 13 November 1923
Ship	State	Description
A. C. Kirk	United Kingdom	The coaster was reported off Flamborough Head, Yorkshire bound for Grangemouth, Stirlingshire. No further trace, presumed foundered in the North Sea with the loss of all hands.

=== 15 November ===
List of shipwrecks: 15 November 1923
Ship	State	Description
Danemark	Denmark	The cargo ship ran aground at Kristiania, Norway. She was refloated on 19 November.
Robert and Elizabeth	United Kingdom	The Thames barge foundered in the Thames Estuary off Southend Pier, Essex. both crew survived.
Sagua	United States	The cargo ship ran aground at Bluefields, Nicaragua. She was refloated on 21 November.

=== 17 November ===
List of shipwrecks: 17 November 1923
Ship	State	Description
Grace N Pendelton	United States	The auxiliary schooner was in collision with another vessel in the North Sea off Cuxhaven, Germany and foundered with the loss of all but two of her crew. Survivors were rescued by Hermes (Germany).
Ibis	United Kingdom	The cargo ship ran aground in Liverpool Bay. She refloated but then grounded again. Declared a total loss, the wreck was dispersed by the Mersey Harbour Board using exploives.
Kronos	Germany	The cargo ship foundered in the Baltic Sea off Saaremaa, Estonia with the loss of all hands, at least fourteen crew.
Rijperkerk	Netherlands	The cargo ship put into Bastia, Corsica, France on fire. She was scuttled by the coastal defense ship HNLMS Marten Harpertszoon Tromp (Royal Netherlands Navy).
Spurn	United Kingdom	The tug foundered in Liverpool Bay whilst going to the aid of Ibis (United Kingdom). Her crew were rescued by the New Brighton Lifeboat.

=== 18 November ===
List of shipwrecks: 18 November 1923
Ship	State	Description
Java	Denmark	The cargo ship ran aground off the Sletterhage Lighthouse, Helgenæs. She was refloated on 22 November.

=== 21 November ===
List of shipwrecks: 21 November 1923
Ship	State	Description
Picardier	Belgium	The cargo ship ran aground off Hornslandet Hudiksvall, Sweden (61°40′30″N 17°30′45″E) with the loss of a crew member. She broke her back on 12 December and was declared a total loss.

=== 23 November ===
List of shipwrecks: 23 November 1923
Ship	State	Description
Otterburn	United Kingdom	The cargo ship suffered an onboard explosion and fire at Marseille, Bouches du Rhône, France and was beached. Several crew members were killed by the explosion.
Victor Réveille	Marine Nationale	The Type UE I submarine ran aground at Boulogne, Pas de Calais.

=== 24 November ===
List of shipwrecks: 24 November 1923
Ship	State	Description
Blankenese	Italy	The cargo ship was towed into Gibraltar on fire and was beached. She was refloated on 27 November.
Kullaberg	Sweden	The coaster ran aground and capsized in the River Humber at Lower Whitton, Lincolnshire, United Kingdom. She was refloated the next day cut ran aground at Broomfleet, Yorkshire. She was refloated again on 29 November.
Little Princess	United Kingdom	The schooner caught fire and was abandoned. Her crew were rescued by West Lashaway (United States).
River Wye	United Kingdom	The cargo ship came ashore at Port Mouton Island, Nova Scotia, Canada (44°00′N 64°20′W) and was a total loss.
Sam	Norway	The auxiliary sailing vessel ran aground off the Færder Lighthouse, Norway. She was refloated but subsequently sank. Her crew were rescued.

=== 26 November ===
List of shipwrecks: 26 November 1923
Ship	State	Description
Shinkoku Maru	Japan	Disabled in the Aleutian Islands by a broken tail shaft during a voyage from Yokohama, Japan, to Portland, Oregon, and under tow by the tug Humaconna (flag unknown), the steamer was wrecked on the rocks off Montague Island at the entrance to Prince William Sound on the south-central coast of the Territory of Alaska after Humaconna was forced to cut her loose during a gale. One crew member died, but the rest reached shore safely.

=== 27 November ===
List of shipwrecks: 27 November 1923
Ship	State	Description
Russ	flag unknown	The cargo ship ran aground at Nida, Lithuania.

=== 29 November ===
List of shipwrecks: 29 November 1923
Ship	State	Description
Sainte Marie	France	The schooner was wrecked in the Pierre des Portes Rocks, off Saint-Malo, Finistère, France.

=== 30 November ===
List of shipwrecks: 30 November 1923
Ship	State	Description
Hermina	Germany	The auxiliary sailing vessel was driven ashore at Wyk auf Föhr, Schleswig-Holstein and was wrecked.

== December ==
=== 1 December ===
List of shipwrecks: 1 December 1923
Ship	State	Description
Jarl	Sweden	The cargo ship struck a mine in the Baltic Sea off Reval, Estonia and sank. Her crew survived.
Neptun	Soviet Union	The schooner was wrecked on Ven, Sweden.

=== 3 December ===
List of shipwrecks: 3 December 1923
Ship	State	Description
Günther	Germany	The cargo ship ran aground off the Bovbjerg Lighthouse, Denmark. She was refloated on 9 December.
Ilga	Latvia	The cargo ship was rammed by Hidrografs (Latvia) off Mühlgraben, Riga, Latvia and was beached.

=== 5 December ===
List of shipwrecks: 5 December 1923
Ship	State	Description
Creek Fisher	United Kingdom	The cargo ship collided with Albia (Spain) off Penarth, Glamorgan and was beached. She was refloated later that day and drydocked at Cardiff.
Rhodopis	Germany	The cargo ship collided with Somme (United Kingdom) in the Scheldt at Antwerp, Belgium and was beached.
Rosa	United Kingdom	The coaster departed London for Gloucester No further trace, presumed foundered with the loss of all hands.
Tone	Norway	The coaster departed Immingham, Lincolnshire, United Kingdom for Christiania. Presumed subsequently foundered in the North Sea with the loss of all hands. A lifeboat from the ship washed up at Lindesnes, Norway on 10 December.
T.W. Lake	United States	The coaster foundered/wrecked in strong winds and heavy seas between Shannon Point and Decatur Island, or Lopez Island, San Juan Islands, a total loss. Lost with of all 18 crew, or 13 of them.

=== 6 December ===
List of shipwrecks: 6 December 1923
Ship	State	Description
Düsseldorf	Germany	The cargo ship ran aground 20 nautical miles (37 km) from Valparaíso, Chile and was wrecked.
Junior	Netherlands	The tug collided with Transporter (United Kingdom) at IJmuiden, North Holland and sank with the loss of a crew member.
Kalfsund	Sweden	The cargo ship ran aground at Järnäs and was wrecked.
Salta	Spain	The schooner came ashore at Bayonne, Basses-Pyrénées, France and was wrecked with the loss of two of her crew.
Viking	United States	The 27-ton, 47-foot (14 m) gasoline-powered vessel washed ashore at Sitkinak Island in the Kodiak Archipelago during a gale. She had broken her anchor chain when the storm struck while she was anchored in the harbor at Kanatak on the Alaska Peninsula in the Territory of Alaska on 3 December and drifted over 70 miles (110 km) to the southeast before coming ashore. She was a total loss, but her cook survived the ordeal.

=== 7 December ===
List of shipwrecks: 7 December 1923
Ship	State	Description
Kalmar	Sweden	The cargo ship collided with Bellglade (United Kingdom) in the North Sea off Cuxhaven, Schleswig-Holstein, Germany and sank with the loss of a crew member.
Mary Peers	United Kingdom	The auxiliary schooner was driven ashore in Whitesand Bay, Cornwall and was wrecked.

=== 9 December ===
List of shipwrecks: 9 December 1923
Ship	State	Description
Rosa	United Kingdom	The coaster foundered in the English Channel 5 nautical miles (9.3 km) south of Portland Bill, Dorset with the loss of all hands. Two bodies were recovered by Innisholm (United Kingdom).
San Marco	United States	The 30-gross register ton, 49.8-foot (15.2 m) fishing vessel was stranded at Kanak Island (60°08′N 144°21′W) off south central Alaska. Her entire crew of eight survived. She later was refloated, repaired, and returned to service.
Universe	United States	During a voyage from Cordova, Territory of Alaska, to Seattle, Washington, the 39-gross register ton, 59.2-foot (18.0 m) fishing vessel was stranded on a sandbar on the west side of Kanak Island (60°08′N 144°21′W) off south central Alaska during a snowstorm. Her entire crew of seven survived. She later was refloated, repaired, and returned to service.

=== 10 December ===
List of shipwrecks: 10 December 1923
Ship	State	Description
John R. Penrose	United Kingdom	The schooner sank at Barbados.
Somersby	United Kingdom	The cargo ship came ashore at Malpica de Berganti, A Coruña, Spain and was wrecked. Her crew were rescued.

=== 11 December ===
List of shipwrecks: 11 December 1923
Ship	State	Description
Bishopton	United Kingdom	The cargo ship came ashore at Kettleness, Yorkshire. She refloated but subsequently sank. Her crew survived.
Rose Marie	United Kingdom	The cargo ship collided with Livorno (United Kingdom) in the North Sea off the Haisbro Lightship (United Kingdom) and sank. All eighteen crew were rescued by Livorno.

=== 12 December ===
List of shipwrecks: 12 December 1923
Ship	State	Description
Peter Killen	United Kingdom	The sold off Castle class trawler ran aground on a small island off the Isle of Lismore, Loch Linnhe, Scotland. Pulled off the next day by trawlers "Lois" and "Ida Adams" both (United Kingdom).

=== 13 December ===
List of shipwrecks: 13 December 1923
Ship	State	Description
Bankdale	United Kingdom	The cargo ship caught fire at Barcelona, Spain and sank.

=== 15 December ===
List of shipwrecks: 15 December 1923
Ship	State	Description
Runa	Norway	The cargo ship sank in the Atlantic Ocean off Charleston, South Carolina, United States. Her crew were rescued by W. W. Mills (United States).

=== 16 December ===
List of shipwrecks: 16 December 1923
Ship	State	Description
Armagh	United Kingdom	The ocean liner ran aground in the River Mersey at Liverpool, Lancashire. All 106 people on board were rescued by the New Brighton Lifeboat and a number of tugs. Armagh later broke her back and was a total loss.
C. A. Smith	United States	The steamer grounded on the submerged breakwater while crossing the Bar at Coos Bay, a total loss. Four to nine crew killed.
Martha	United Kingdom	The schooner was destroyed by fire at Yarmouth, Nova Scotia, Canada.

=== 17 December ===
List of shipwrecks: 17 December 1923
Ship	State	Description
Algora	United Kingdom	The cargo ship departed Hamburg, Germany for Rochester, Kent. No further trace, presumed foundered in the North Sea with the loss of all hands.
C. A. Smith	United States	The auxiliary schooner was wrecked in Coos Bay with the loss of ten crew.
Demerara Lightship	United Kingdom	The lightship sank off Georgetown, British Guiana.
Ravn	Norway	The cargo ship foundered in the North Sea. Her eighteen crew were rescued by the trawler Flow (United Kingdom).

=== 18 December ===
List of shipwrecks: 18 December 1923
Ship	State	Description
Asama Maru	Japan	The cargo ship collided with Paul Lecat (France) in the Inland Sea of Japan and was beached.
Wren	United Kingdom	The 119-foot (36 m), 168-ton steam trawler sank in a blizzard in the North Sea 180 miles (290 km) east northeast of Spurn. Lost with all 9 hands.

=== 19 December ===
List of shipwrecks: 19 December 1923
Ship	State	Description
Alesia	United Kingdom	The cargo ship, which was to be scrapped, broke free from her tow and came ashore on Terschelling, Netherlands. She was still there in April 1924.

=== 20 December ===
List of shipwrecks: 20 December 1923
Ship	State	Description
Limburg	Netherlands	The tug came ashore at Maasvlakte, South Holland. Her crew were rescued.

=== 22 December ===
List of shipwrecks: 22 December 1923
Ship	State	Description
Batavier	Straits Settlements	The cargo ship went ashore on Pulau Midai, Natuna Islands, Borneo, Netherlands East Indies, and was abandoned.
Gotha	Sweden	The schooner ran aground on the Haisbro Sands. She was refloated but sank in the North Sea off the Wold Lightship (United Kingdom). Her crew were rescued by a Swedish steamship.

=== 25 December ===
List of shipwrecks: 25 December 1923
Ship	State	Description
Frielinghaus	Germany	The cargo ship ran aground and was beached at Risvær, Norway.
Hjortholm	Denmark	The cargo ship came ashore on Skagen. Her crew were rescued by the Skagen Lifeboat.

=== 26 December ===
List of shipwrecks: 26 December 1923
Ship	State	Description
J. Oswald Boyd	United States	The cargo ship ran aground at Port Eads, Louisiana. She was refloated on 29 December.
Tekirdagh	Turkey	The coaster sank at Constantinople in a blizzard.

=== 27 December ===
List of shipwrecks: 27 December 1923
Ship	State	Description
Gunlog	Sweden	The cargo ship was driven ashore on Fehmarn, Schleswig-Holstein, Germany. She was refloated on 31 December.
Kong Haakon	Denmark	The cargo liner ran aground north of Fanø. Forty passengers were taken off by a tug. She was refloated the next day.

=== 28 December ===
List of shipwrecks: 28 December 1923
Ship	State	Description
Algama	United Kingdom	The cargo ship ran aground at Les Baleines, Loire-Atlantique. Her crew were rescued.
Colibri	France	The tanker was driven ashore at San Stefano, Turkey. She was refloated on 2 January 1924.
Conejos	United States	The cargo ship sank in the Black Sea 130 nautical miles (240 km) west of Hatum, Turkey (42°14′N 38°19′E).
Isonzo	Italy	The cargo ship collided with Ak-Deniz (Turkey) off Zonguldak, Turkey and sank.
T. M. Nicholson	United States	The vessel was lost with seven crewmen.

=== 29 December ===
List of shipwrecks: 29 December 1923
Ship	State	Description
Czarina	Newfoundland	The barquentine sprang a leak in the Atlantic Ocean and was abandoned. Her crew were rescued by Cairnmona (United Kingdom).
Margaret	Denmark	The auxiliary sailing ship caught fire at Copenhagen and was scuttled.
Mutlah	Italy	The cargo ship issued an SOS in the Mediterranean Sea (38°40′N 6°34′E). No further trace, presumed foundered with the loss of all hands.
Sir Redvers Buller	United Kingdom	The cargo ship collided with Newtonards (United Kingdom) in the River Thames at Erith, Kent and sank. She was refloated on 2 January.

=== 30 December ===
List of shipwrecks: 30 December 1923
Ship	State	Description
Biesbosch	Belgium	The cargo ship was abandoned and foundered 3 nautical miles (5.6 km) off Flamborough Head, Yorkshire, United Kingdom. Her crew were rescued by the Bridlington Lifeboat.

=== 31 December ===
List of shipwrecks: 31 December 1923
Ship	State	Description
A. Moulton	United Kingdom	The schooner was wrecked at St. John's, Newfoundland.
Pruth	United Kingdom	The cargo ship ran aground on the Natara Reef, off Port Moresby, New Guinea and was wrecked.

=== Unknown date ===
List of shipwrecks: Unknown date in December 1923
Ship	State	Description
No. 242 (or Number 242)	United States	The halibut-fishing vessel was lost in a storm at Point Retreat (58°24′45″N 134°57′15″W) in Southeast Alaska.
Shinkoku Maru	Japan	The cargo ship ran aground on Montague Island, Alaska, United States in the early days of December. She was declared a total loss on 16 January 1924.

== Unknown date ==
List of shipwrecks: Unknown date in 1923
Ship	State	Description
Alfonso XIII	Spain	The passenger ship was severely damaged by fire whilst fitting out. She was subsequently repaired and entered service.
Duncan City	United States	Duncan City in 2015. The wooden tug was abandoned and scuttled in 15 feet (4.6 m) of water in Lake Huron off the coast of Michigan at 45.413117°N 83.762217°W circa 1923. She was listed as abandoned in 1927.
J. C. Ames	United States	The 160.2-foot (48.8 m) 537-gross register ton wooden steam screw tug was stripped of useful parts and equipment, towed into Maritime Bay, an arm of Lake Michigan off Manitowoc, Wisconsin, and burned as a means of disposal. She sank in 9 feet (2.7 m) of water at 44°06.551′N 087°38.312′W, where her wreck was broken up by wind, waves, and ice, buried in sand, and forgotten. The wreck was discovered in May 2025.
