= Erith Playhouse =

Theatre in south-east London, England

Coordinates: 51.4811°N 0.1815°E

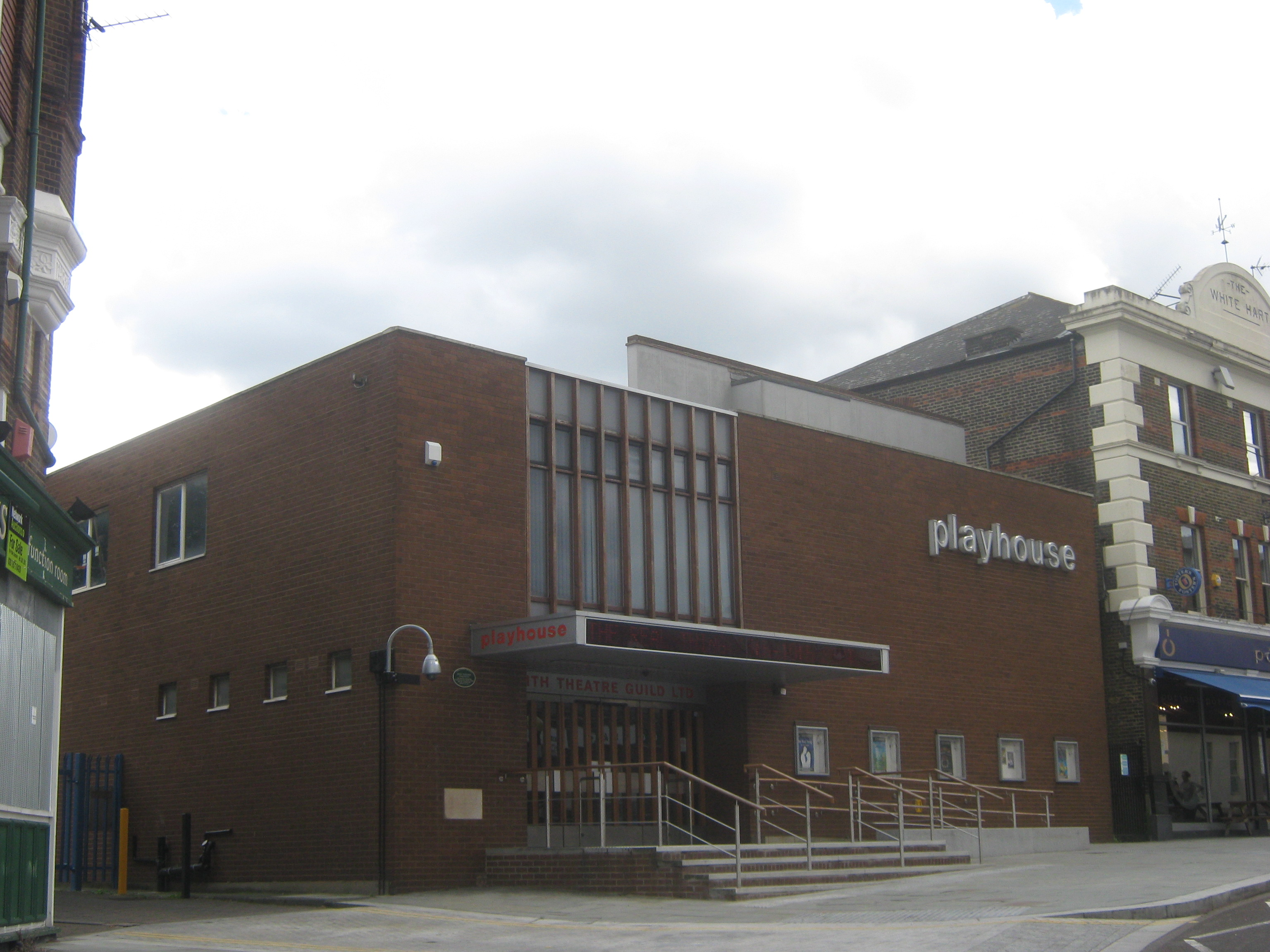
Erith Playhouse

The Erith Playhouse is a theatre in Erith, in south-east London, England. The building was originally the Oxford Cinema.

== History ==
The building was originally the Oxford Cinema, which opened on 27 July 1913, showing silent movies. It continued as a cinema until 1938, when it closed, opening again as a news cinema for a short time. During the Second World War it was used as a store for furniture from the bombed homes in the locality.

=== Conversion to a theatre ===
The conversion of the cinema for theatrical use was begun by the volunteers of Erith Theatre Guild in 1947. The Guild had been formed in 1943 to promote greater co-operation between the various amateur entertainment groups in the area, and the affiliated groups combined to mount an annual production. The first of these was Berkeley Square in 1944. Performances had to be staged in school halls, local buildings, and on tour in various unlikely venues. At the end of the war, despite the shortage of money and materials, the Guild made plans for its own theatre, and eventually obtained a lease for the old cinema from the local council.

The conversion process took two years of hard work by mainly amateur builders in their spare time. An area of each of the side walls of the old cinema screen - which was simply painted on the wall of the building - was cut away to create wing space and provide access to very crude dressing rooms and the scene dock, based in old army huts outside. The orchestra pit and under-stage basement storage area were excavated. All of this was accomplished with equipment and materials that were begged, borrowed, or second-hand, and everything was completed finally on the day that the first production opened: Yellow Sands on Saturday, 1 October 1949.

=== Problems and triumphs ===
Initial audiences were not large, but the debts were, causing the demise over the next 6 years of 10 of the original 13 societies affiliated to the Guild. A loan from the Borough Council, and some re-organisation of the Guild, which now began to present its own plays (rather than just performances from individual affiliated societies) led to improvements in both audience and finances. The loan was repaid, and profits were used to further develop the theatre.

Uncertainty faced the theatre and Guild during the 1960s as Erith Town Centre, the Greater London Borough of Bexley, and new regulations for fire safety came into being. In December 1969, the local authority gave notification that it would grant the Erith Theatre Guild a 21-year lease on the theatre building, on the condition that improvements were made to the premises. Plans for the renovation were drawn up, and members of the Guild started fund-raising towards the £75,000 cost of their dream.

=== Closed for renovation ===
The Playhouse closed in November 1972 for the work to begin. The finances for the rebuilding had been negotiated with the Borough Council generously providing an interest-free loan, but fund-raising efforts were still necessary. The members created a travelling music hall, which gave them an opportunity to keep performing, and brought in extra cash. It proved so popular that it continued for a number of years after the theatre re-opened.

Between November 1972 and December 1973, the old outside buildings were demolished, new foundations were laid, and a large amount of new building work, including many front-of-house and backstage improvements, and a completely new frontage for the building, were built. The original Oxford cinema auditorium and the stage remained intact.

=== Back to business ===
The remodelled Playhouse was opened by the Mayor of Bexley, Councillor Turner, on 1 December 1973, for the public to view the new building. The first production on stage was Cinderella in January 1974.

The theatre celebrated its 50th anniversary in 1999.

In 2006, as part of the Erith Riverside Conservation Area Improvements Project, the frontage of the theatre was modernised, with new exterior lighting and an electronic marquee sign.

Erith Theatre Guild Ltd, which administers the theatre, is a charity, and all the proceeds from productions at the Playhouse are used to further improve the facilities at the theatre.

== Features and traditions ==
The theatre's present auditorium is still basically the original from cinema times, apart from the modifications noted above. It is slightly unusual because it is a little narrower at the front (previously the screen, now the stage and orchestra pit) than it is at the rear (where the audience enters), which is why rows in the front half of the theatre have one fewer seat than those towards the back. Also, half of Row "F" is missing to allow for the Fire Exit at the side of the auditorium.

For many years the theatre did not have its own licensed bar, so some of the audience would visit one of the public houses either side of the theatre before shows and during the interval. In order that these ticket holders did not miss any of the show, the theatre's warning bells before curtain-up and after the interval were relayed to the bars in both public houses. The theatre now has its own licence to serve alcohol and both public houses have changed usage (one to a restaurant, the other housing) so this system is no longer in operation.
