= Bill Jaques =

English footballer

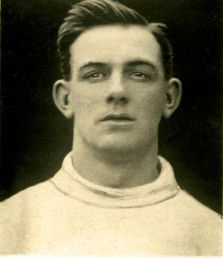

Personal information
- Full name: William Jaques
- Date of birth: 8 December 1888
- Place of birth: Erith, Kent, England
- Date of death: 6 June 1925 (aged 36)
- Height: 5 ft 10 in (1.78 m)
- Position: Goalkeeper

Senior career*
Years	Team	Apps	(Gls)
1909–1911	Northfleet United		
1911–1914	Coventry City		
1914–1922	Tottenham Hotspur	138	
- * Club domestic league appearances and goals

Bill Jaques also known as Jacques (8 December 1888 – 6 June 1925) was a professional footballer who played for Northfleet United (where he won the Kent Senior Cup in 1910), Coventry City and Tottenham Hotspur.

== Football career ==
Jaques signed for Tottenham from Coventry in 1914. The reliable goal keeper played a total of 138 matches in all competitions for the club between 1914 and 1922. He was a regular in the Second Division championship winning side of 1919–20.

== Honours ==
Tottenham Hotspur

- Football League Second Division: 1919–20
