= Erith Urban District Council Tramways =

Passenger tramway operator in England (1905–1933)

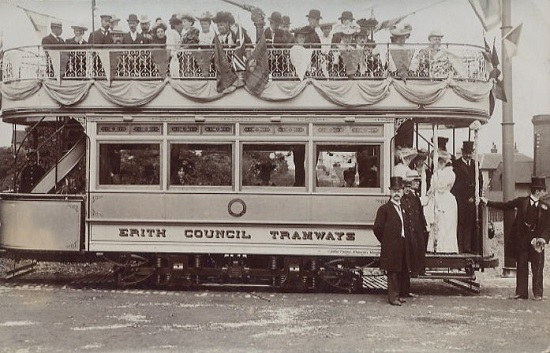

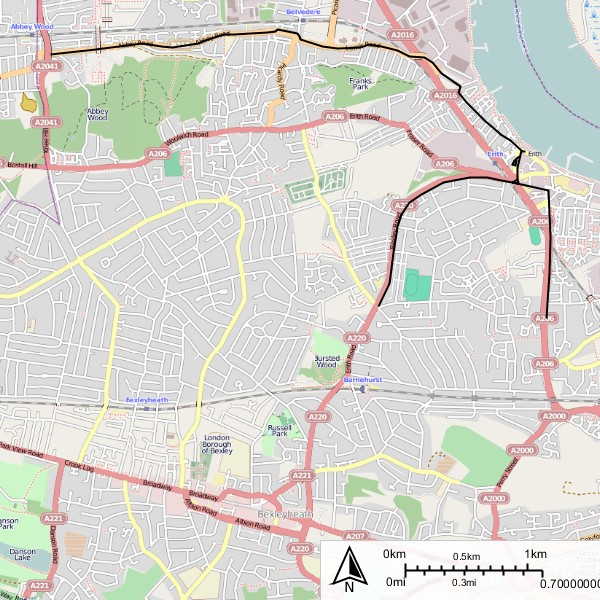
- Map showing the routes of the Erith Urban District Council Tramways

Operation
- Locale: Erith
- Open: 26 August 1905
- Close: 1 July 1933
- Status: Closed

Infrastructure
- Track gauge: 1,435 mm (4 ft 8 1/2 in)
- Propulsion system: Electric
- Depot: Walnut Tree Road

Statistics
- Route length: 4.7 miles (7.6 km)

Erith Urban District Council Tramways operated a passenger tramway service in Erith between 1905 and 1933.

== History ==
Erith Urban District Council launched this tramway system to connect with the London County Council network at Plumstead.

The service was brought into being by the passing of the Erith Tramways and Improvement Act 1903 (3 Edw. 7. c. ccl), which authorised the construction of 6 miles (10 kilometres) of track. Construction began in 1904 and on 26 August 1905 trams began running along a 4 3/4-mile (7.6-kilometre) route with tramcars purchased from Brush Electrical Engineering Company.

== Routes ==
The main route ran from Abbey Wood to Belvedere and Erith, where it split into two short branches – one along Bexley Road (now the A220 road) to Northumberland Heath and the other to North End via the Crayford Road (now the A206 road). There was a connection to the Bexley system at Northumberland Heath, but there was no connection to the London system until after the creation of the London Passenger Transport Board in 1933.

== Closure ==
The service between Erith and North End was closed in 1910 due to poor revenues. The remaining service was taken over by London Passenger Transport Board on 1 July 1933.
