= John Downton =

English painter

- Born: 27 March 1906; Erith, Kent
- Died: 1991 (aged 84–85)
- Education: The Slade
- Known for: paintings, drawings

John Downton (27 March 1906 – 1991) was an English artist, philosopher, musician, and poet.

Born in Erith, Kent, on 27 March 1906 to Albert Victor Downton (1873 - 1925; an engineer) and Flora Edith (1875 - 1962; née Mitchell) both of Wiltshire, Downton drew well from an early age. He was educated at Erith Convent, followed by Erith Grammar School. At the age of fifteen he won the youth silver medal of the Royal Drawing Society. He was educated at Queens' College, Cambridge (1925–1928), first in English and then in Art History, and then trained as a painter at the Slade. Downton played the violin all his life, was often invited to give performances, and always participated in the fortnight-long Grittleton Summer School of Music in Malvern, Worcestershire. He also wrote books, such as The Death of Art (1937) and Craftsmanship, Art and Criticism (1993). But it is his paintings for which he is now chiefly remembered. He travelled regularly around Europe, and was particularly happy in northern Italy. His main subject was young girlhood, rendered in the manner of the Italian old masters and with the tempera technique that had been revived by the Birmingham Group.

Both his subject matter and his techniques were deeply unfashionable during most of his adult life, and he ceased to exhibit after the start of the Second World War, during which he was a conscientious objector, working on the land in Shropshire and Pitlochry, Scotland. He had two sisters: Hilda (1901 - 2006) and Mary (1903 - 1989). Hilda, who lived to 104, was a talented artist. Her painting of Ightham Mote is owned by the National Trust, and it was she who established the John Downton Award in 2000. Her legacy also provided for a specialist music room at Walthamstow Hall School in her brother's name. John Downton's portrait of Hilda was gifted to the Hull Museum Collection He never married, and lived mostly in Cambridge. On his death in 1991, all his work passed to The Downton Trust.

A major retrospective exhibition and catalogue was produced in 1996, and the exhibition toured the UK. His three main masterpieces are: The Battle (1935, now in Birmingham Museum & Art Gallery); Portrait of a Girl (1938, now in The Tate); Nora Russell (1935, which was gifted to the Russell-Cotes Art Gallery, Bournemouth, in 1998).

There is an annual John Downton Award for Young Artists, given to those attending secondary schools in the county of Kent.

== Books by John Downton ==
- The Death of Art: Incorporating Notes on Philosophy and Ethics (1937, 1995).
- Craftsmanship, Art and Criticism (1993).
- Philosophical Notes (1993).
- Reflections on Violin Playing (1994).
- Poems (1995).
