= Lesya (disambiguation) =

Lesya can mean:

- Lesya, a Slavonic name that derives from Ukrainian diminutive form of the name Alexandra
- Lesya Ukrainka (1871–1913), Ukrainian poet, writer and critic. Named after her:
  - The Lesya Ukrainka National Academic Theater of Russian Drama is a theater in Kyiv, Ukraine
  - Asteroid 2616 Lesya.
- Lesya Vasil'yevna Dychko (1939–), Ukrainian composer
- Lesya Voronyna (born 1955), Ukrainian writer, translator and journalist
- Lesya Vorotnyk, Ukrainian ballerina
- Lesya Yaroslavskaya (1981–), Russian pop singer
- Lesya, the coloring of the soul in Jainism
