= Steve Rutter =

English footballer

Personal information
- Date of birth: 24 July 1968 (age 58)
- Place of birth: Erith, England
- Position: Forward

Senior career*
Years	Team	Apps	(Gls)
- Kettering Town
1991–1992	Maidstone United	1	(0)
- Worcester City
- * Club domestic league appearances and goals

Steve Rutter (born 24 July 1968) is a former professional footballer who played as a forward in The Football League for Maidstone United.
