= Municipal Borough of Erith =

Local government district in Kent, England (1876–1965)

Coordinates: 51.480°N 0.175°E

Erith
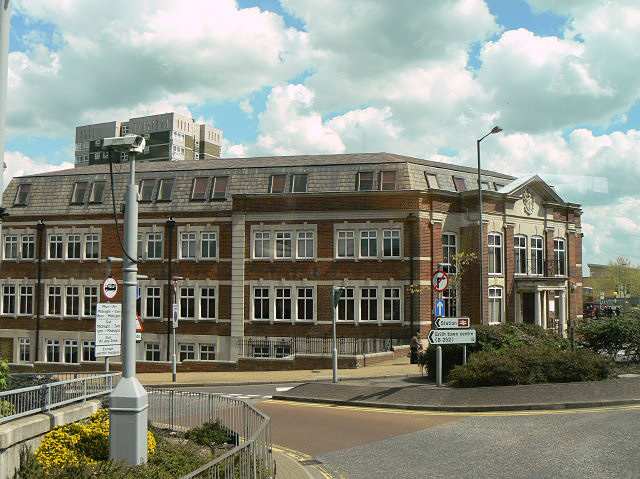
- Erith Town Hall
- History
  - Created: 1876
  - Abolished: 1965
  - Succeeded by: London Borough of Bexley
- Status: Local Government District (1876-1894) Urban district (1894 - 1938); Municipal borough (after 1938)
- Government
  - HQ: Erith
  - Motto: LABOUR OVERCOMES ALL THINGS

Erith was a local government district in north west Kent from 1876 to 1965 around the town of Erith. It also included the generally suburban areas of Northumberland Heath, Belvedere, and parts of Barnehurst, Bexleyheath, Crayford and the SE2 London Postal District of Abbey Wood.

== History ==
The district was formed when the Local Government Act 1858 was adopted by the parish of Erith, and a Local Board was formed to govern the town. Under the Local Government Act 1894 it became an urban district. It moved to purpose-built offices at Erith Town Hall on 2 June 1932.

The district ran its own tram services as Erith Urban District Council Tramways until they became the responsibility of the London Passenger Transport Board in 1933. In 1938 it gained the status of municipal borough.

In 1965 it was abolished by the London Government Act 1963 and its former area transferred to Greater London from the administrative county of Kent. Its former area was combined with that of other districts to form the present-day London Borough of Bexley.
