= Tuyalyas =

Tuyalyas Туяляс
- Selo
- Location within Bashkortostan Location within Russia
- Coordinates: 52°50′N 58°40′E
- Country: Russia
- Region: Bashkortostan
- District: Sibay
- Time zone: UTC+5:00

Tuyalyas (Russian: Туяляс; Bashkir: Төйәләҫ, Töyäläś) is a rural locality (a selo) in Sibay, Bashkortostan, Russia. The population was 1,075 as of 2010. There are 9 streets.

== Geography ==
Tuyalyas is located 19 km north of Sibay. Kazanka is the nearest rural locality.
