= Sibay Airport =

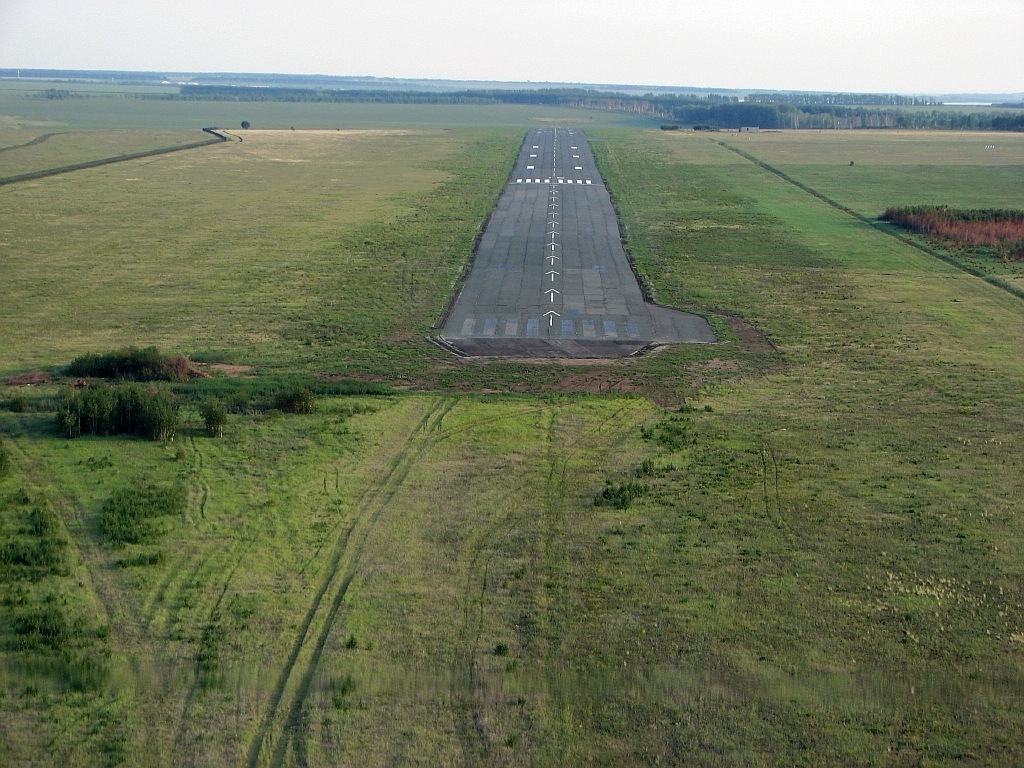
- IATA: none; ICAO: UWUA

Summary
- Airport type: Public
- Serves: Sibay
- Location: Sibay
- Elevation AMSL: 1,309 ft / 399 m
- Coordinates: 52°41′0″N 58°43′0″E
- Interactive map of Sibay Airport

Runways
Direction	Length		Surface
Direction	ft	m	Surface
18/36	6,316	1,925	Asphalt

Sibay Airport (Bashkir: Сибай Аэропорты) (ICAO: UWUA) is an airport in Russia located 5 km east of Sibay. It has a simple utilitarian layout.

== History ==
The airport started in 1955 with rapid development of the city. It services a mining town (the open pit mine is in this town). A new asphalt runway built in 1994. At the time, regular service was interrupted.

From November 2009 it is planned to restore scheduled airline service to Ufa.

== See also ==
- List of airports in Russia
