= Lesya Vorotnyk =

Ukrainian ballerina

Olesya Vorotnyk (Ukrainian: Олеся Воротник), also known as Lesya Vorotnyk, is a Ukrainian ballerina.

== Biography ==
Vorotnyk danced as a member of the corps de ballet, and later as a soloist, with the National Opera of Ukraine.

She joined the Armed Forces of Ukraine during the Russo-Ukrainian War in March 2022, after the country's opera houses were ordered to close. She enlisted after President Volodymyr Zelenskyy called upon citizens to defend Ukraine against the Russian invasion. A picture of Vorotnyk wearing military gear and holding a Kalashnikov rifle circulated on social media platforms.
