= Olesya (given name) =

Olesya (Ukrainian and Russian: Олеся), also spelt Olessia or Olesia, is a feminine given name.

It is a Slavonic name that derives from Ukrainian diminutive form of the name Alexandra, and thus acquires the meaning of "protector". The names Alesya and Lesya can be considered variants.

Notable people with the name include:

- Olesya Aliyeva (b. 1977), Russian alpine skier
- Olesya Babushkina (b. 1989), Belarusian gymnast
- Olesya Bakunova (b. 1980), Belarusian sprint canoer
- Olesya Barel (b. 1960), Russian basketball player
- Olesya Belugina (b. 1984), Russian gymnast
- Olesya Chumakova (b. 1981), Russian middle-distance runner
- Olesya Dudnik (b. 1974), Ukrainian gymnast and coach
- Olesya Forsheva (b. 1979), Russian athlete
- Olesya Hudyma (b. 1980), Ukrainian artist, poet and journalist
- Olesya Kurochkina (b. 1983), Russian football player
- Olesya Mashina (b. 1987), Russian footballer
- Olesya Nazarenko (born 1976), amateur wrestler, judoka and sambo player from Turkmenistan
- Olesya Nurgalieva (b. 1976), Russian ultramarathon runner
- Olesya Povh (b. 1987), Ukrainian sprinter
- Olesya Rostovskaya (b. 1975), Russian composer, theremin player, carillonneur, organist, Russian zvon bell-ringer
- Olesya Rulin (b. 1986), Russian-American actress
- Olesya Vadimovna Sokur (1960–2025), Ukrainian biologist, biochemist
- Olesya Stefanko (b. 1988), Ukrainian beauty pageant winner
- Olesya Syreva (b. 1983), Russian athlete
- Olesya Velichko (b. 1981), Russian modern pentathlete
- Olesya Vladykina (b. 1988), Russian Paralympic swimmer
- Olesya Zabara (b. 1982), Russian triple jumper
- Olesya Zamula (b. 1984), Azerbaijani wrestler
- Olesya Zykina (b. 1980), Russian athlete
