= Alesya (singer) =

Belarusian singer

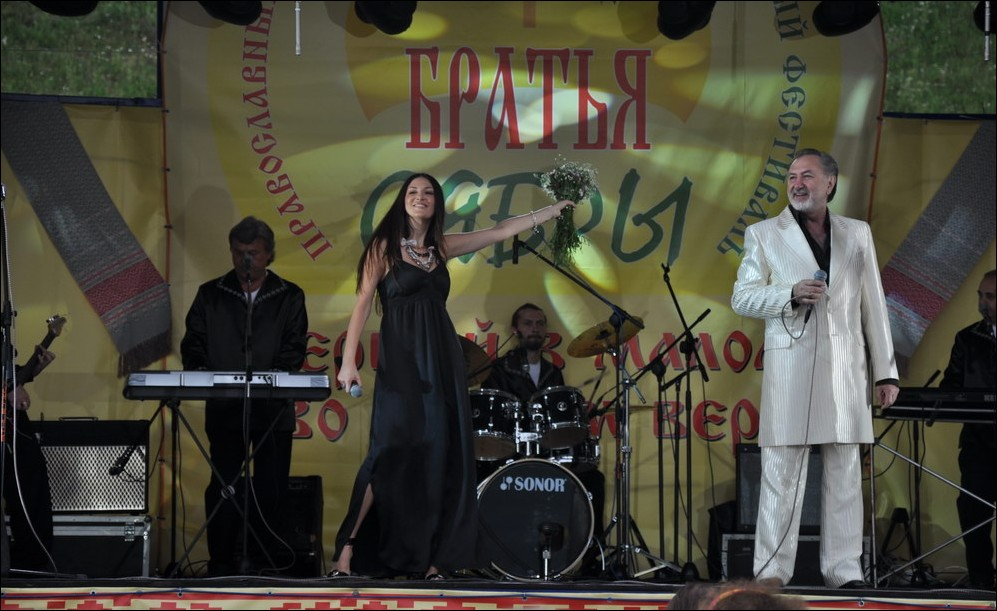
Alesya, pictured on stage with her father Anatoly.

Alesya (Але́ся) (Olga Yarmolenko) (born Во́льга Анато́леўна Ярмо́ленка on 27 June 1976 in Babruysk) is a Belarusian singer who is a member of the band Syabry.

Alesya sings both in Belarusian and Russian. She is the daughter of the band leader Anatoly Yarmolenko.

== Awards and recognition ==
On November 28, 2005 Alesya received the Gratitude of President recognition.

In 2012 she was awarded the Francysk Skaryna Medal. The award decree mentioned her as "artist-vocalist (soloist) of higher category Olga Yarmolenko".
