= SS Alesia (1896) =

German-built merchant steamship

History
- Name: 1896: Bangalore; 1897: Alesia
- Namesake: 1896: Bangalore; 1897: Alesia
- Owner: 1896: Hamburg – Calcutta Line; 1897: Hamburg America Line; 1915: Admiralty; 1923: Board of Trade; 1924: Crete Shipping Co
- Operator: 1924: Stelp & Leighton Ltd
- Port of registry: 1896: (German Empire) Hamburg; 1915: (United Kingdom) London
- Builder: Flensburger Schiffbau
- Completed: March 1896
- Identification: 1896: code letters RKJT; 1915: UK official number 139040; 1915: code letters JLFS
- Fate: Scrapped by 1925

General characteristics
- Type: merchant ship
- Tonnage: 5,060 GRT, 3,267 NRT
- Length: 404.0 ft (123.1 m)
- Beam: 50.0 ft (15.2 m)
- Depth: 21.2 ft (6.5 m)
- Decks: 1
- Installed power: 426 NHP
- Propulsion: 2 × triple-expansion engines; 2 × screws
- Notes: sister ships: Ambria, Aragonia

SS Alesia was a German-built merchant steamship. She was completed in 1896 as Bangalore, but renamed Alesia in 1897 when Hamburg America Line (HAPAG) bought out her owners. The British government in India seized her in the First World War. She was scrapped in the 1920s.

She was the first of two ships that HAPAG named after Alesia in ancient Gaul. The second was a steamship that was launched in 1921.

== Three sister ships ==
In 1896 the Flensburger Schiffbau-Gesellschaft built two twin-screw steamships for Adolph Kirsten's Hamburg – Calcutta Line. Bangalore was completed in March 1896, and Bhandara was completed that July. Flensburger Schiffbau had also laid down a third ship, which Kirsten intended to call Burmah.

In 1897 HAPAG bought Hamburg – Calcutta Line from Kirsten. HAPAG renamed Bangalore and Bhandara as Alesia and Ambria respectively. In March 1897 Flensburger Schiffbau completed Burmah as Aragonia.

== Description ==
Bangalore's registered length was 404.0 ft (123.1 m), her beam was 50.0 ft (15.2 m), and her depth was 21.2 ft (6.5 m). Her tonnages were 5,060 GRT and 3,267 NRT. She had a pair of three-cylinder triple-expansion engines, one driving each of her twin screws. The combined power of her twin engines was rated at 426 NHP. Kirsten registered Bangalore in Hamburg. Her code letters were RKJT.

== British ownership ==
The British authorities in India seized Alesia early in the First World War. The Admiralty assumed ownership of her, but she was registered as a civilian merchant ship. She was registered in 1915 in London, her UK official number was 139040, and her code letters were JLFS. By 1923 her ownership had been transferred to the Board of Trade. By 1924 the Board of Trade had sold her to the Crete Shipping Company of London. Her managers were Stelp and Leighton. She had been scrapped by 1925.

== Bibliography ==
- Haws, Duncan (1980). The Ships of the Hamburg America, Adler and Carr Lines. Merchant Fleets in Profile. Vol. 4. Cambridge: Patrick Stephens Ltd. ISBN 0-85059-397-2.
- Lloyd's Register of British & Foreign Shipping. Vol. I.–Steamers. London: Lloyd's Register of Shipping. 1896 – via Internet Archive.
- Lloyd's Register of British & Foreign Shipping. Vol. I.–Steamers. London: Lloyd's Register of Shipping. 1897 – via Internet Archive.
- Lloyd's Register of Shipping. Vol. I.–Steamers & Motorships. London: Lloyd's Register of Shipping. 1924 – via Internet Archive.
- Mercantile Navy List. London. 1916 – via Crew List Index Project.
- Mercantile Navy List. London. 1923 – via Crew List Index Project.
- Mercantile Navy List. London. 1924 – via Crew List Index Project.
