= Erith =

Area of south-east London, England

Coordinates: 51.480°N 0.1778°E

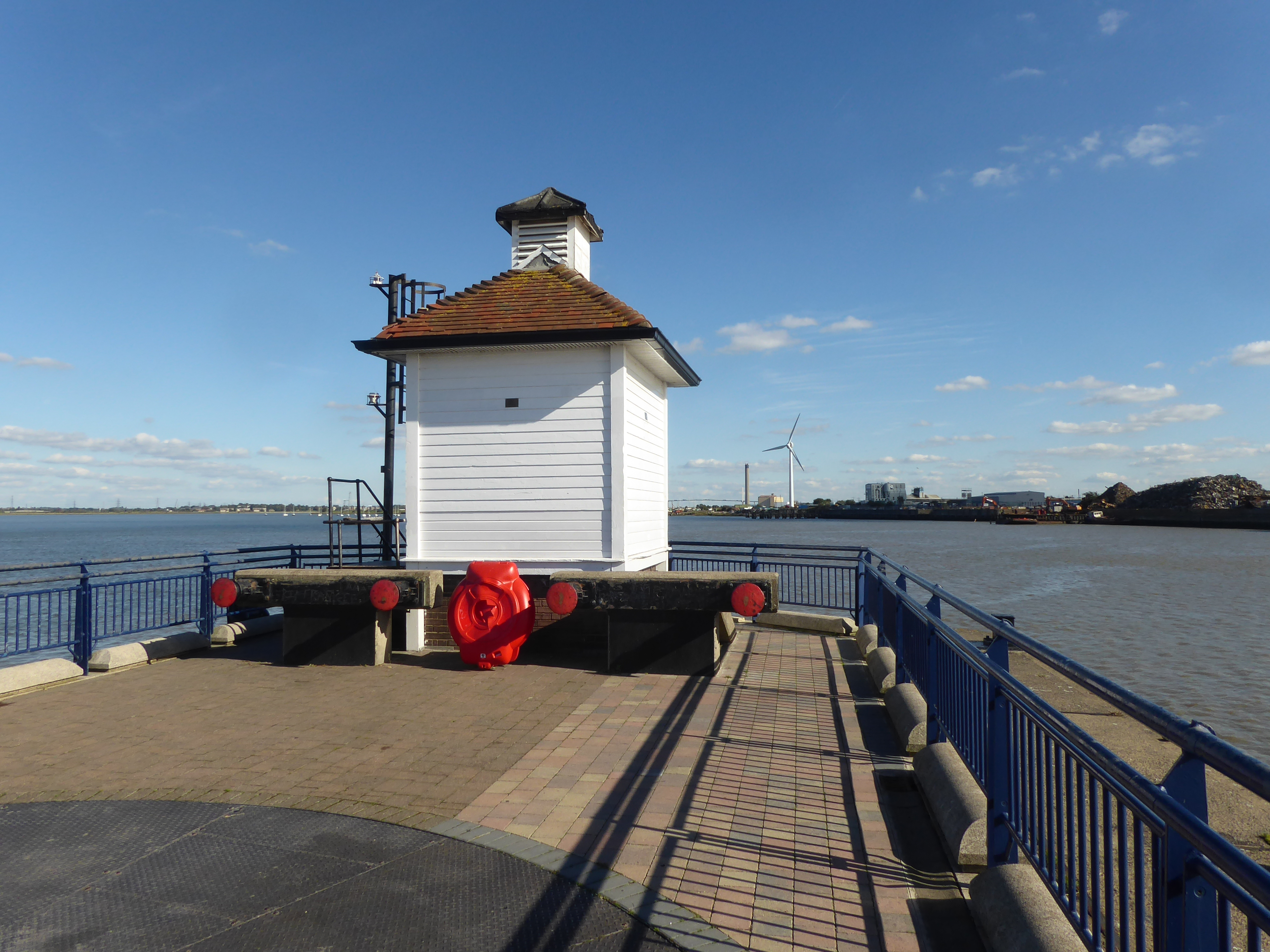
- The end of Erith Pier

- Location within Greater London
- Population: 45,345 (2011 Census)
- OS grid reference: TQ505775
  - Charing Cross: 13.3 mi (21.4 km) WNW
- London borough: Bexley
- Ceremonial county: Greater London
- Region: London
- Country: England
- Sovereign state: United Kingdom
- Post town: ERITH
- Postcode district: DA8, DA18
- Dialling code: 01322
- Police: Metropolitan
- Fire: London
- Ambulance: London
- UK Parliament: Erith and Thamesmead; Bexleyheath and Crayford
- London Assembly: Bexley and Bromley

Erith (/ˈɪərɪθ/) is an area in south-east London, England, 13.3 miles (21.4 km) east of Charing Cross. Before the creation of Greater London in 1965, it was in the historical county of Kent. Since 1965, it has formed part of the London Borough of Bexley. It lies north-east of Bexleyheath and north-west of Dartford, on the south bank of the River Thames.

The town centre has been modernised with further dwellings added since 1961. The curved riverside high street has three listed buildings, including the Church of England church and the Carnegie Building. Erith otherwise consists mainly of suburban housing. It is linked to central London and Kent by rail and to Thamesmead by a dual carriageway. It has the longest pier in London, and retains a coastal environment with salt marshes alongside industrial land.

== History ==
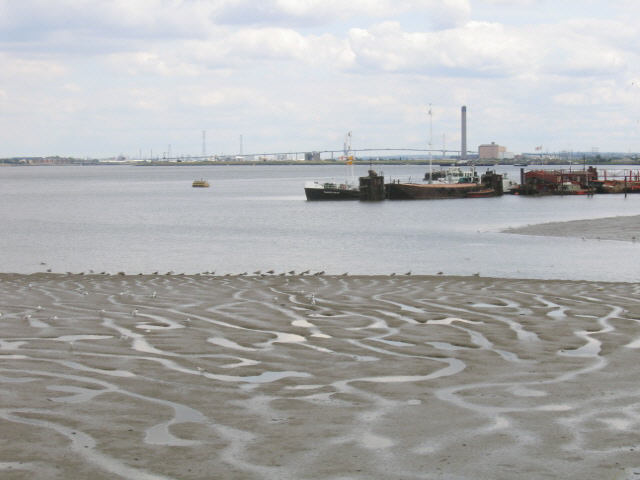
Mudflats on the Thames, with the Queen Elizabeth II Bridge in the far background

=== Pre-medieval ===
Work carried out at the former British Gypsum site in Church Manorway by the Museum of London Archaeological Service shows that the area was covered by a dense forest of oak, yew and alder in the Neolithic period, which by the Bronze Age had given way in part to sedge fen.

The museum's work at the former site of Erith School in Belmont Road revealed traces of prehistoric settlement and a substantial community or farmstead in the first century CE.

=== Anglo-Saxons ===
After the collapse of Roman rule in the early 5th century, Britain was colonised by Anglo-Saxon invaders from northern Europe. The Anglo-Saxon Chronicle records that they won the Battle of Crecganford (thought to be modern Crayford) in 457 and shortly after claimed the whole of Kent. Their different way of life was reflected in their settlement pattern. The town and country estates of Roman bureaucrats gave way to a network of villages occupied by warriors and farmers. Erith was one such and has a Saxon name, originally Ærre hyðe meaning "old haven".

There was probably a church on the site of the present St John the Baptist's in the Anglo-Saxon period. The early settlement was based around it, meaning that the centre of Erith was once west of its current location.

=== Medieval ===
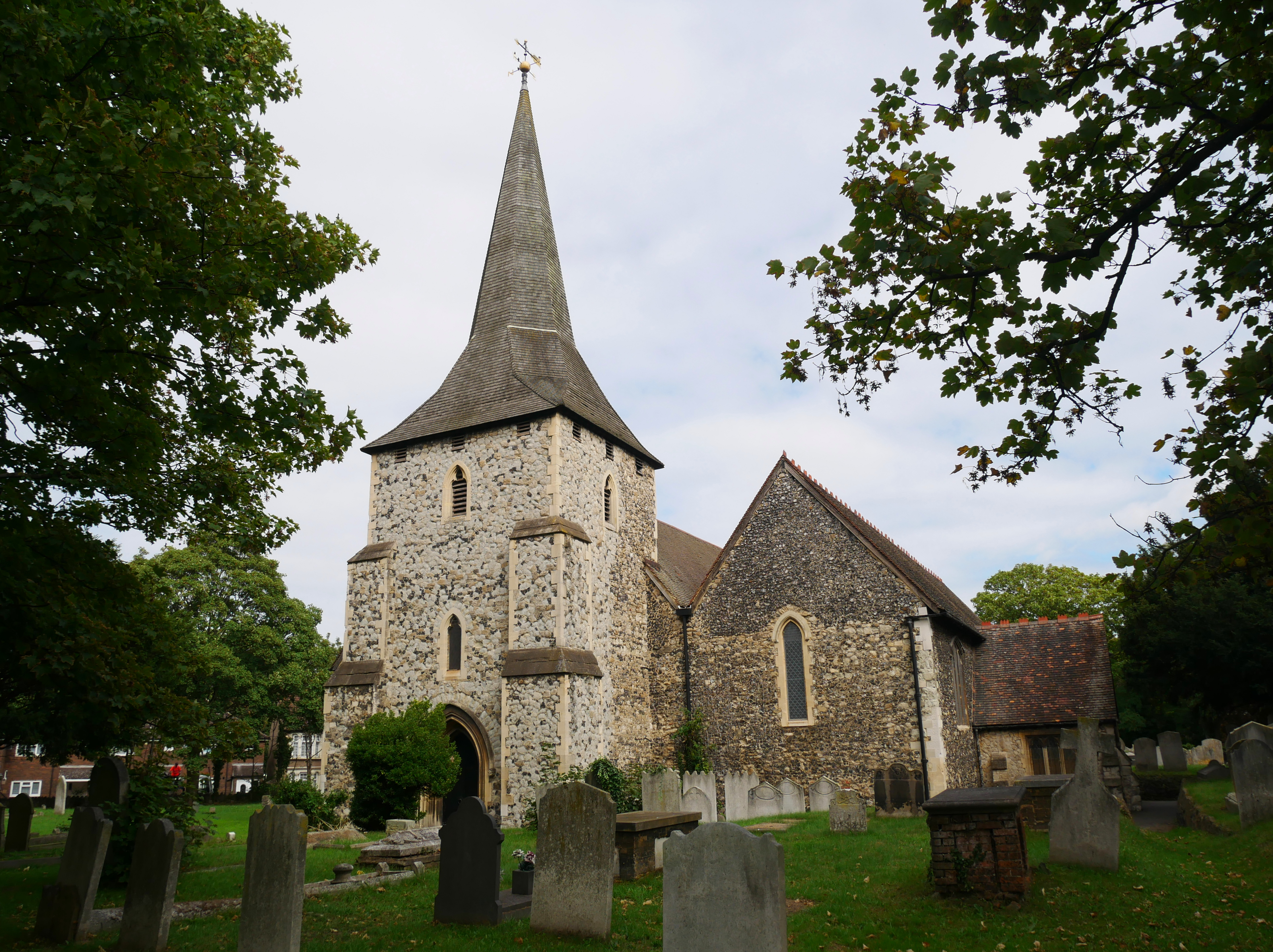
The medieval Church of John the Baptist in Erith

The earliest written reference to the area is in a Latin charter of 695, recording a grant by the Bishop of the East Saxons of land at Erith. The surrounding area was known as Lesnes or Lessness, which is mentioned in the Domesday Book of 1086. After the Norman Conquest, Lessness passed into the possession of Bishop Odo. In 1315, a Royal Charter was granted for a market to be held in Erith every Thursday, but it was noted in 1776 that the market was long discontinued.

Erith owes its existence to the Thames, and was until the 1850s essentially a small riverside port, given prominence by King Henry VIII's decision to open a naval dockyard there, approximately where the Riverside Gardens are now. Henry's famous warship, Henri Grace à Dieu, was fitted out there in 1515.

After the death of George Talbot, 4th Earl of Shrewsbury in 1538, Erith "alias Lysnes" was granted to his widow, Elizabeth, by Henry VIII "with all its members and appurtenances, to hold in capite, by knight's service."

Erith remained a popular anchorage until the 19th century. Ships often discharged cargo there to reduce their displacement before entering shallows upstream.

=== Industrial era ===
In 1797, Edward Hasted described Erith as "one small street of houses, which leads to the water side", and mentions annual fairs at Ascension and Michaelmas. In 1831, Erith's population was 1,533. It was composed in 1840 "chiefly of two streets, one leading down to the water side, the other branching off to the left towards the church."

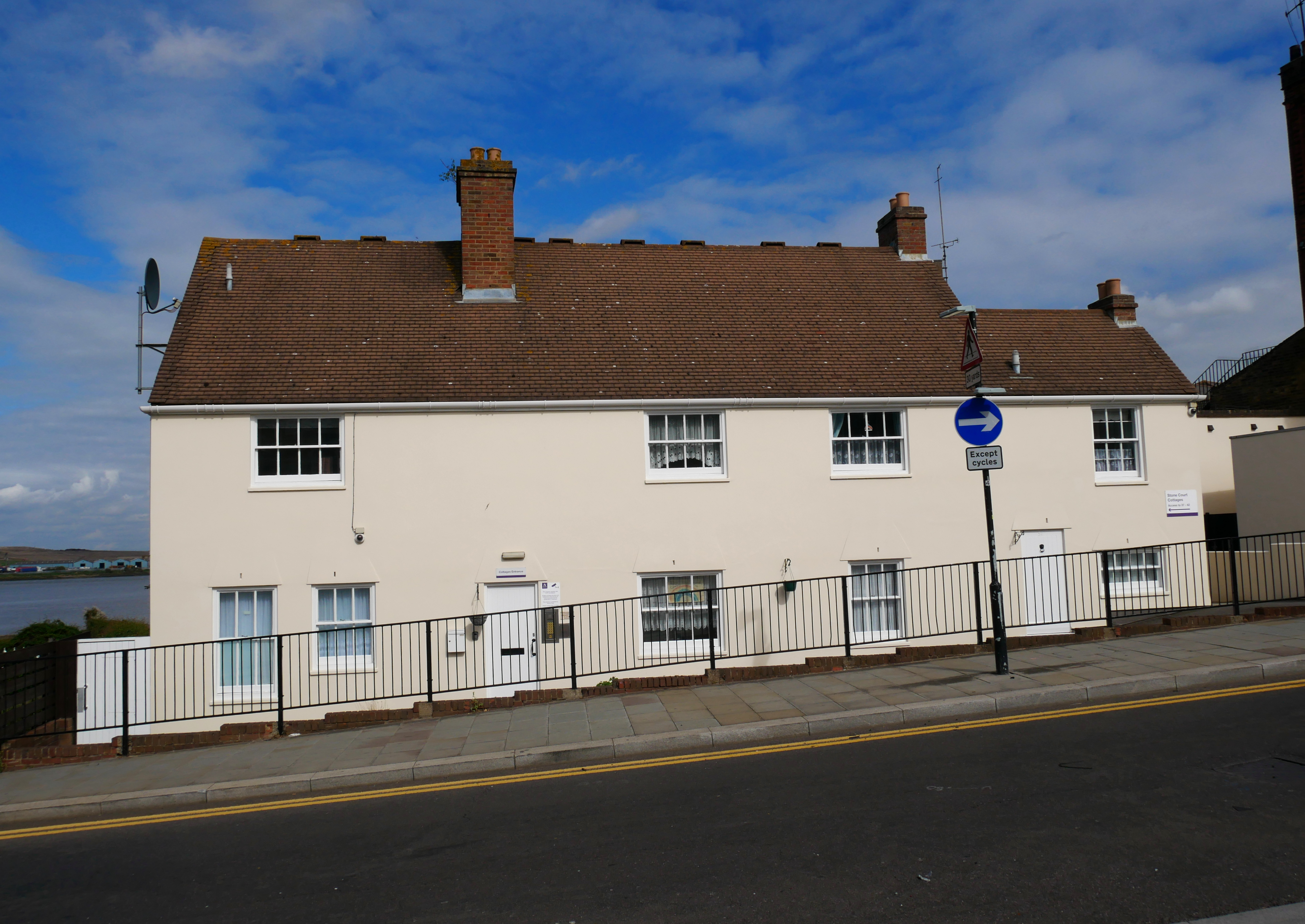
28 and 30 Erith High Street, a building with eighteenth-century origins in Erith.

By 1849, Erith was enjoying a short spell as a riverside resort. Its pier and nearby hotel gave hospitality for day-trippers arriving on Thames pleasure boats or by rail. An arboretum with extensive pleasure grounds was opened to attract visitors.

Erith Iron Works was established in 1864 on a riverside site at Anchor Bay, east of Erith's centre, by William Anderson.

On 1 October 1864, a 46½-ton gunpowder explosion blew out the river wall, exposing large areas of South London to flooding at high tide. A crowd of navvies and soldiers directed by a local engineer managed to plug the gap just before high water.

From 1881, an area north-west of Erith's centre was the site of a cable works founded by William Callender. This became British Insulated Callender's Cables (BICC) and eventually Pirelli, which announced its partial closure in 2003. The remainder became Prysmian.

=== 20th century ===
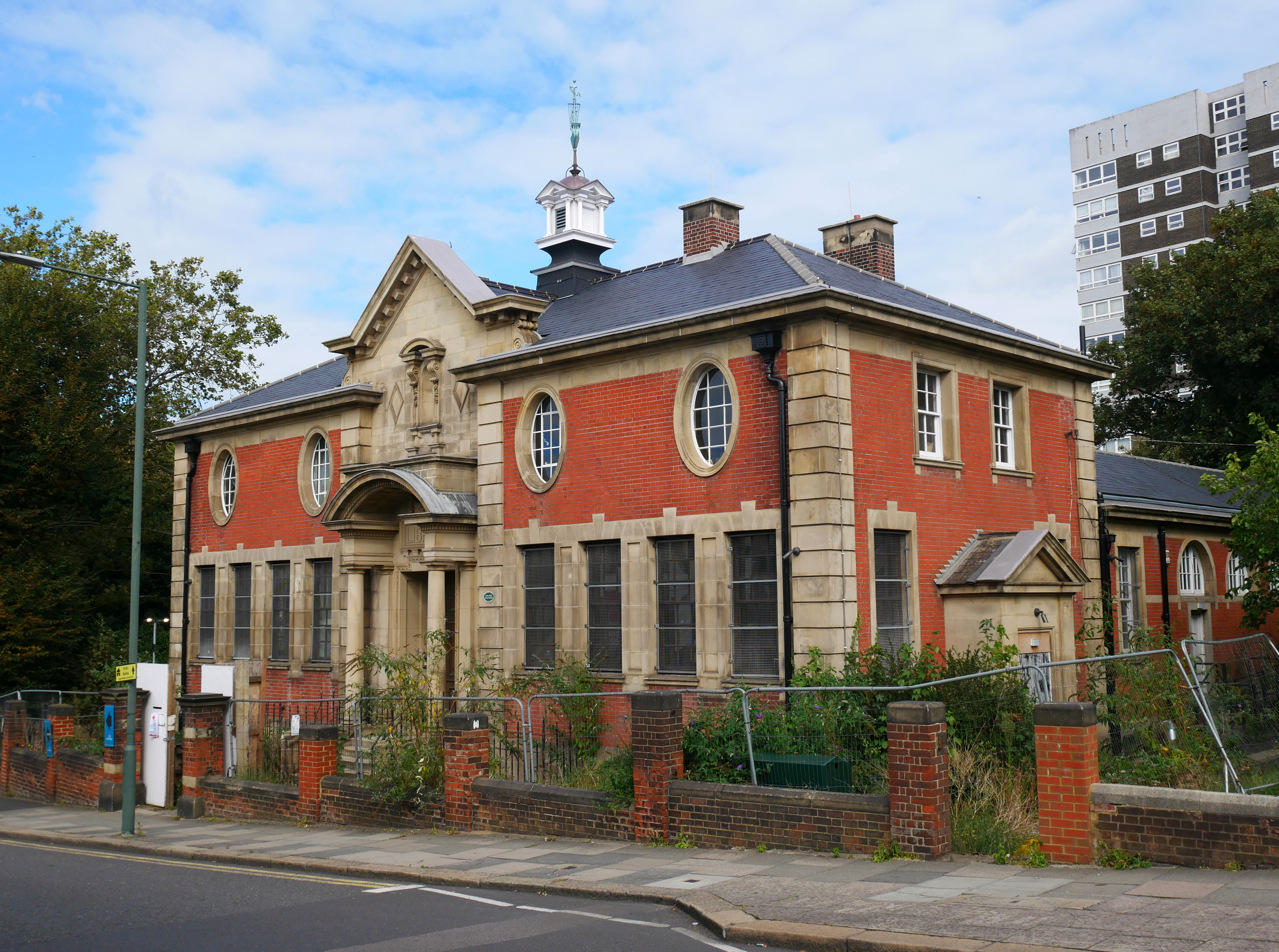
The Old Library, a Grade II listed building in Walnut Tree Road by William Egerton, opened on 7 April 1906.

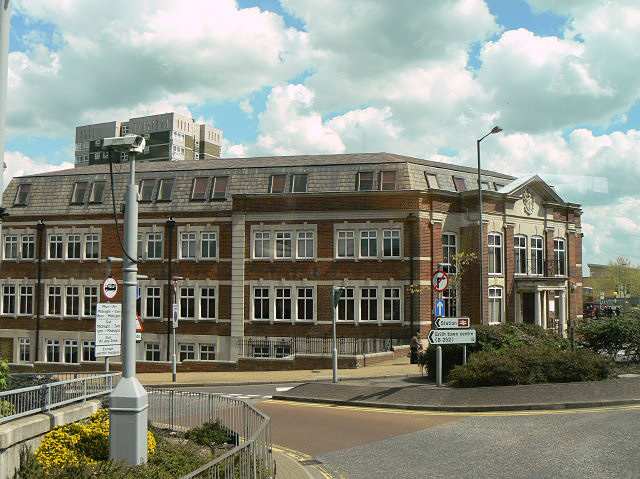
Erith Town Hall, completed in 1932

The Local Government Act 1894 brought into existence Erith Urban District, which became the Municipal Borough of Erith in 1938. It included Northumberland Heath and Belvedere.

Erith's first library, designed by local architect William Egerton and funded by philanthropist Andrew Carnegie, opened in 1906.

Engineering became an important industry in Erith, with armaments and cables as the main products. Vickers was a major employer, with links to the Royal Arsenal at nearby Woolwich.

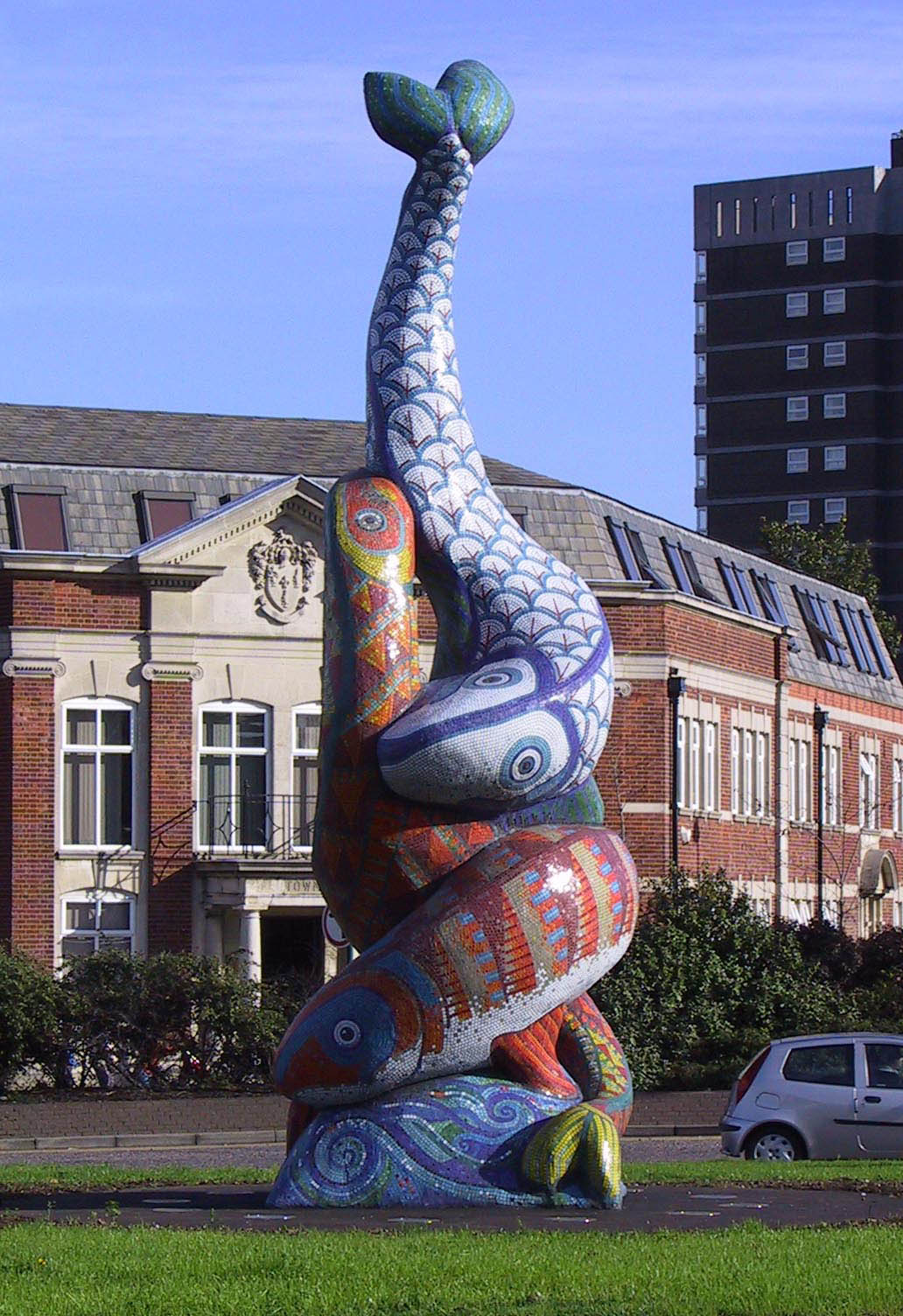
'The De Luci' 'dancing fish' mosaic statue at the roundabout in the town centre designed and created by artist Gary Drostle in 2006

During the First World War, Erith was an important area for the manufacture of guns and ammunition, largely due to the presence of the large Vickers works. In the Second World War, the town suffered heavy bomb damage, mainly because of its riverside position near the Royal Arsenal. The bomb damage and a gradual decline in local trade prompted major redevelopment in the 1960s.

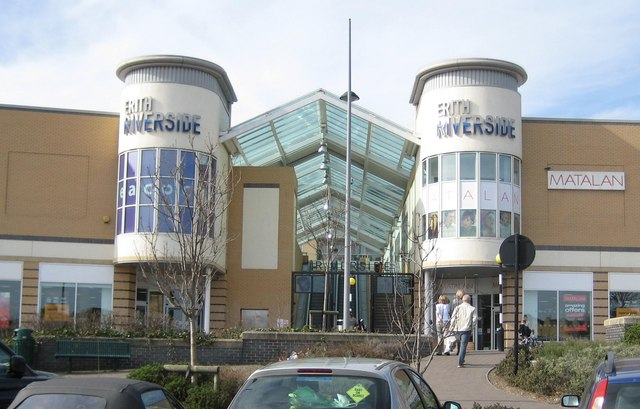
Riverside Shopping Centre

In 1961, Erith began to be redeveloped as a modern shopping and working environment, through the clearing of sub-standard housing by the riverside and alterations to the street layout. Some of the new buildings, such as the social housing tower blocks, have a brutalist form typical of overspill estates built by councils in major cities as an affordable way to clear the slums.

In 1965, under the London Government Act 1963, Erith became part of the London Borough of Bexley.

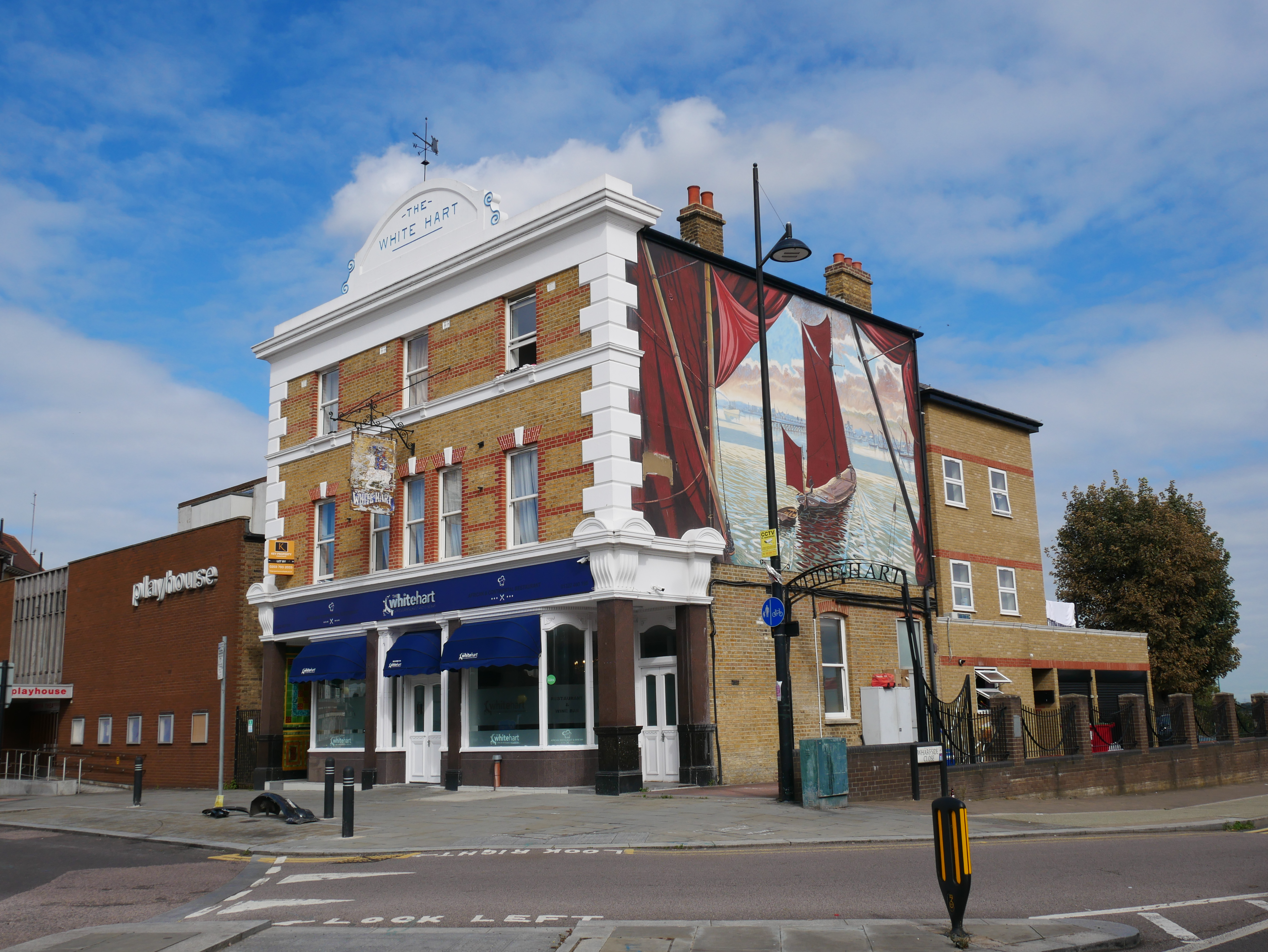
The White Hart in Erith featuring Thames Barge mural by Gary Drostle.

Demolition of the old town started in 1966 and continued in phases until 1980, leaving only a few reminders of the old town centre. Many of the original Victorian buildings were lost, but some original townscape remains, including the White Hart in the High Street and St John's Church in West Street.

=== Regeneration ===
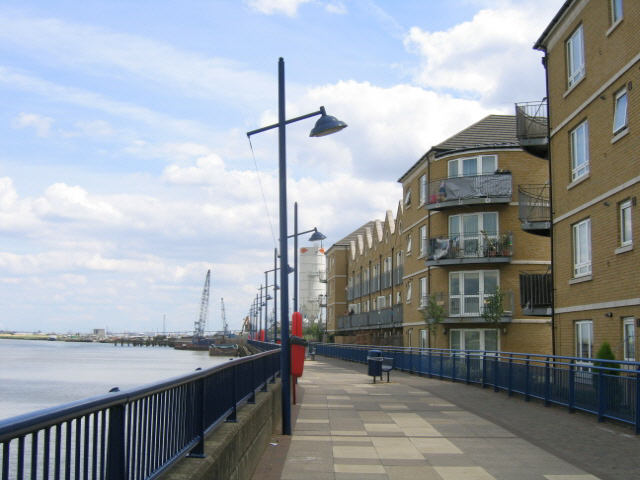
Riverside apartment blocks, just east of Erith town centre

Since the late 1990s, Erith has undergone marked changes, culminating in the Erith Western Thames Gateway project. The regeneration falls within the remit of the Thames Gateway project, with Erith as a focus for Bexley Council, as its only population centre on the River Thames. Since 2000, a significant number of new flats have been built on the river by private developers. The Erith Western Gateway will include riverside flats, and is expected to include the regeneration of a large underused area of the town centre, earmarked by Bexley Council for a mixed-use development with up to 6,000 sq. m of new commercial space and over 500 new homes.

In 2020, local campaigners secured National Lottery funding to restore the former library building as new community facilities.

== Demography ==
The population of Erith is 62% White British, according to the 2011 census, down from 82% in 2001 and 89% in 1991. The second highest ethnicity is Black African, at 14%.

The median house price in Erith ward was £181,000 in 2014, the third lowest of the 628 wards in Greater London, with only neighbouring Belvedere and the Abbey ward of Barking and Dagenham having lower prices.

== Representation ==
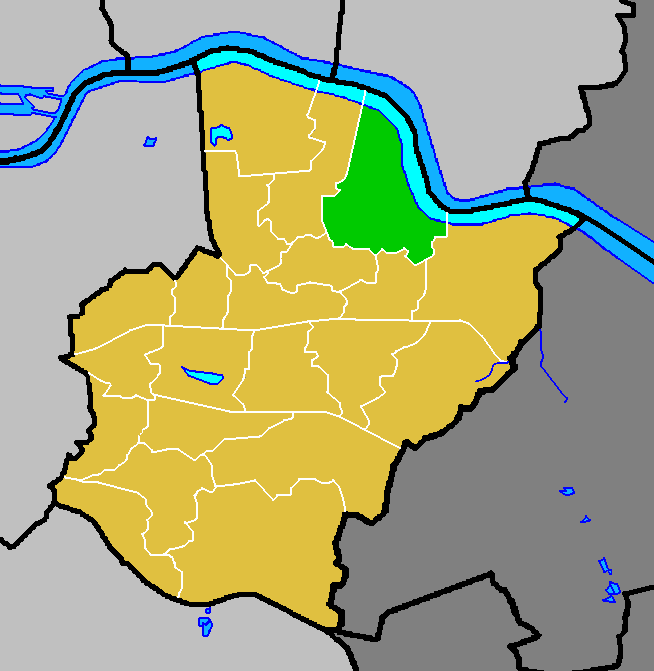
Erith ward (green) within the London Borough of Bexley (yellow)

Much of Erith is in the Erith ward of the London Borough of Bexley. The local councillors are Joe Ferreira and Nicola Taylor (both Labour). The eastern part of Erith is in North End ward and the southern part in Colyers ward.

Most of Erith lies within the Erith and Thamesmead constituency. The current Member of Parliament is Abena Oppong-Asare (Labour). The eastern part of Erith is within the Bexleyheath and Crayford constituency, whose MP is Daniel Francis (Labour).

Erith is in the Bexley and Bromley London Assembly constituency and is represented on the London Assembly by Thomas Turrell (Conservative).

== Amenities ==
- Erith Leisure Centre, including swimming facilities, was opened in 2005.
- The David Ives Stadium next to the Leisure Centre, often called Erith Stadium, is the home track of Bexley Athletic Club.
- The Erith Playhouse Theatre is the largest in Bexley.

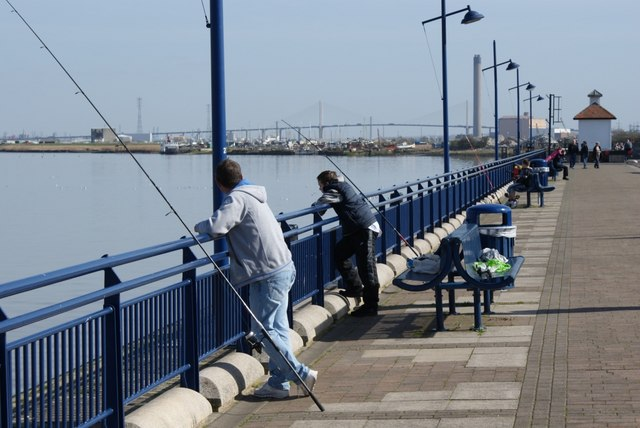
Fishing from Erith Deep Wharf

- Erith has the longest pier in Greater London.
- Erith Rowing Club is located on the Erith waterfront. Erith Yacht Club is based a short distance downstream from Erith on the edge of Crayford Marshes.
- There are two senior football clubs named for Erith, although only Erith Town is based in the town, Erith & Belvedere play at Park View Road in Welling.

=== Festivals ===
The annual Erith Riverside Festival is held in Riverside Gardens alongside the Thames. Erith is the starting point for the London Outer Orbital Path (LOOP) and one starting point for the Green Chain Walk. The Thames Path National Trail, which runs to the source of the River Thames at Kemble, begins at nearby Crayford Ness.

== Notable people ==
- Philip Absolon (b. 1960), Stuckist artist, was born in Erith.
- Ronnie Aldrich (1916–1993), jazz pianist and band-leader, was born in Erith.
- Patrick Young Alexander (1867–1943), aeronautical pioneer, born in Belvedere, Erith.
- Mark Andrews (1875−1939), organist and composer
- William Auld (1924–2006), Scottish poet, author and Esperantist, born in Erith
- Sir William Anderson (1834–1898), engineer and philanthropist, lived in Erith from 1864 until 1889 and contributed substantial time and money to the local community.
- Sian Blake (1972–2015), British actress, and her two sons were murdered in their home in Erith in December 2015.
- Tony Brise (1952–1975), motor-racing driver, was born in Erith.
- Wendy Cope (b. 1945), poet, was born in Erith.
- John Downton (1906–1991), artist, poet and philosopher, was born in Erith.
- Paul Golding (b. 1982), far-right politician and leader of Britain First, grew up in Erith
- Kevin Horlock (b. 1972), footballer, Northern Ireland international, was born in Erith
- Bill Jaques (1888–1925), footballer, was born in Erith.
- James Leasor (1923–2007), journalist and author
- Dave Martin (b. 1985), footballer, born in Erith
- Douglas McWhirter (1886–1966), amateur footballer, part of the gold medal-winning English team at the 1912 Summer Olympics, was born in Erith.
- Percy Hilder Miles (1878–1922), professor, violinist and composer, lived in Erith.
- Alan Morton (b. 1950), footballer, was born in Erith.
- Robert Napper (b. 1966), serial murderer and rapist, was born in Erith
- Anthony Reckenzaun (1850–1893), engineer, worked at the Erith Ironworks and set up evening classes for the workmen.
- Steve Rutter (b. 1968), footballer, born in Erith
- Sam Saunders (b. 1983), footballer (Brentford F.C.), born in Erith
- Linda Smith (1958–2006), comedian and writer, came from Erith. Smith famously joked that Erith was not twinned with any town but had a suicide pact with Dagenham.
- James Stephanie Sterling (b. 1984), video game journalist, born and grew up in Erith
- Denis Thatcher (1915–2003), husband of Prime Minister Margaret Thatcher, headed the family owned Atlas Preservatives, based in Erith, until 1965.
- Henry Wheatley (1777–1852), keeper of the privy purse for King William IV and Queen Victoria from 1830 to 1846, born and grew up at Lesney House.

== Culture ==
=== Poetry ===
A rhyme by William Cosmo Monkhouse:

"There are men in the village of Erith that nobody seeth or heareth,
and there looms on the marge of the river a barge, that nobody roweth or steereth".

=== Places of worship ===
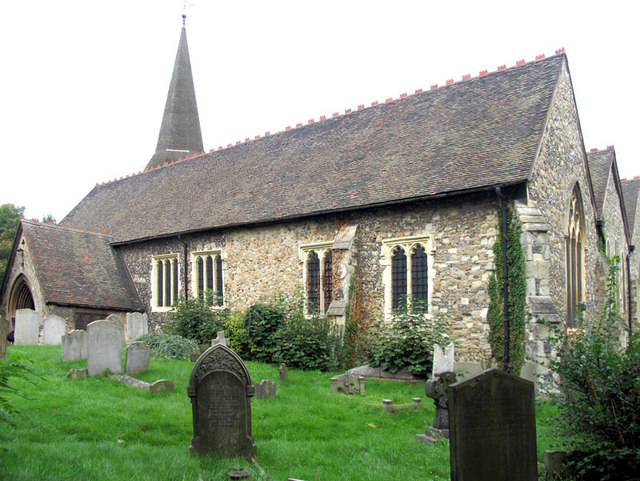
St. John the Baptist Church

- Barnehurst Methodist Church
- Christ Church, Victoria Road
- Christadelphian Hall, Lesney Park Road
- Northend Baptist Church, Larner Road
- Northumberland Road Baptist Church, Belmont Road
- Our Lady of the Angels Catholic Church, Carlton Road
- Queen Street Baptist Church
- St Augustines Church (Slade Green), Slade Green Road
- St Johns the Baptist Church, West Street
- St Paul's Church, Mill Road

== Transport ==
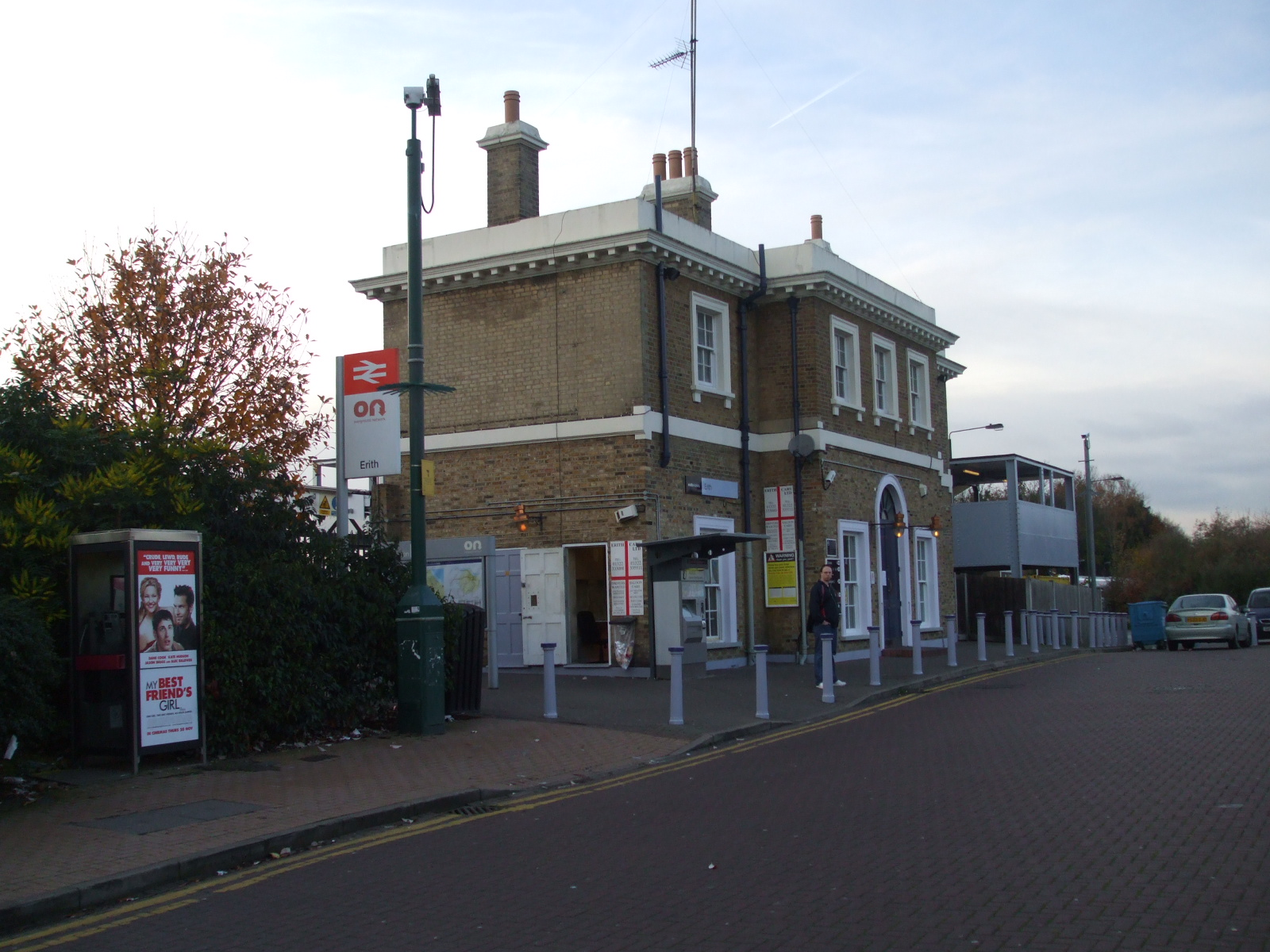
Erith railway station

=== Buses ===
Erith is served by the following bus routes, (all of which are run by TFL):

- 99 to Bexleyheath (via Slade Green & Barnehurst), or to Woolwich (via Upper Belvedere, West Heath & Plumstead)
- 180 to North Greenwich (via Lower Belvedere, Abbey Wood, Plumstead, Woolwich & Charlton)
- 229 to Sidcup (via Northumberland Heath, Barnehurst, Bexleyheath, Bexley & Albany Park) or to Thamesmead (via Lower Belvedere & Abbey Wood)
- 428 to Bluewater (via Slade Green, Crayford & Dartford)
- 469 to Woolwich Common (via Lower Belvedere, Upper Belvedere, West Heath, Abbey Wood, Plumstead & Woolwich)
- B12 to Joydens Wood (via Northumberland Heath, Bexleyheath & Bexley)
- N89 to Charing Cross (via Slade Green, Barnehurst, Bexleyheath, Welling, Shooters Hill, Blackheath, Lewisham, Deptford, New Cross, Peckham, Camberwell, Elephant & Castle, Blackfriars & Aldwych) – night service

=== Rail ===
The nearest station is Erith for Southeastern services towards Dartford, Gillingham, Gravesend, London Cannon Street and London Charing Cross. Slade Green railway station is on the same line and serves the eastern part of the town.

=== Road ===
The A2016 road bisecting Erith, is a dual carriageway stretching across the Erith Marshes.

== Geography ==
Erith is a post town in the DA postcode area, consisting of the DA8 and DA18 postcode districts. It borders the River Thames to the north, Slade Green to the east and south east, Northumberland Heath to the south and south west and Belvedere to the west and north west.

=== Erith Quarry ===
To the west of Erith town centre is the Erith Quarry development which aims to redevelopment the former quarry site with construction work beginning in 2015. The site currently features a new primary school and local supermarket and plans to contain 850 new homes once fully completed.
