= Sibay =

Town in the Republic of Bashkortostan, Russia

Sibay Сибай
- Town

Other transcription(s)
  - Bashkir: Сибай
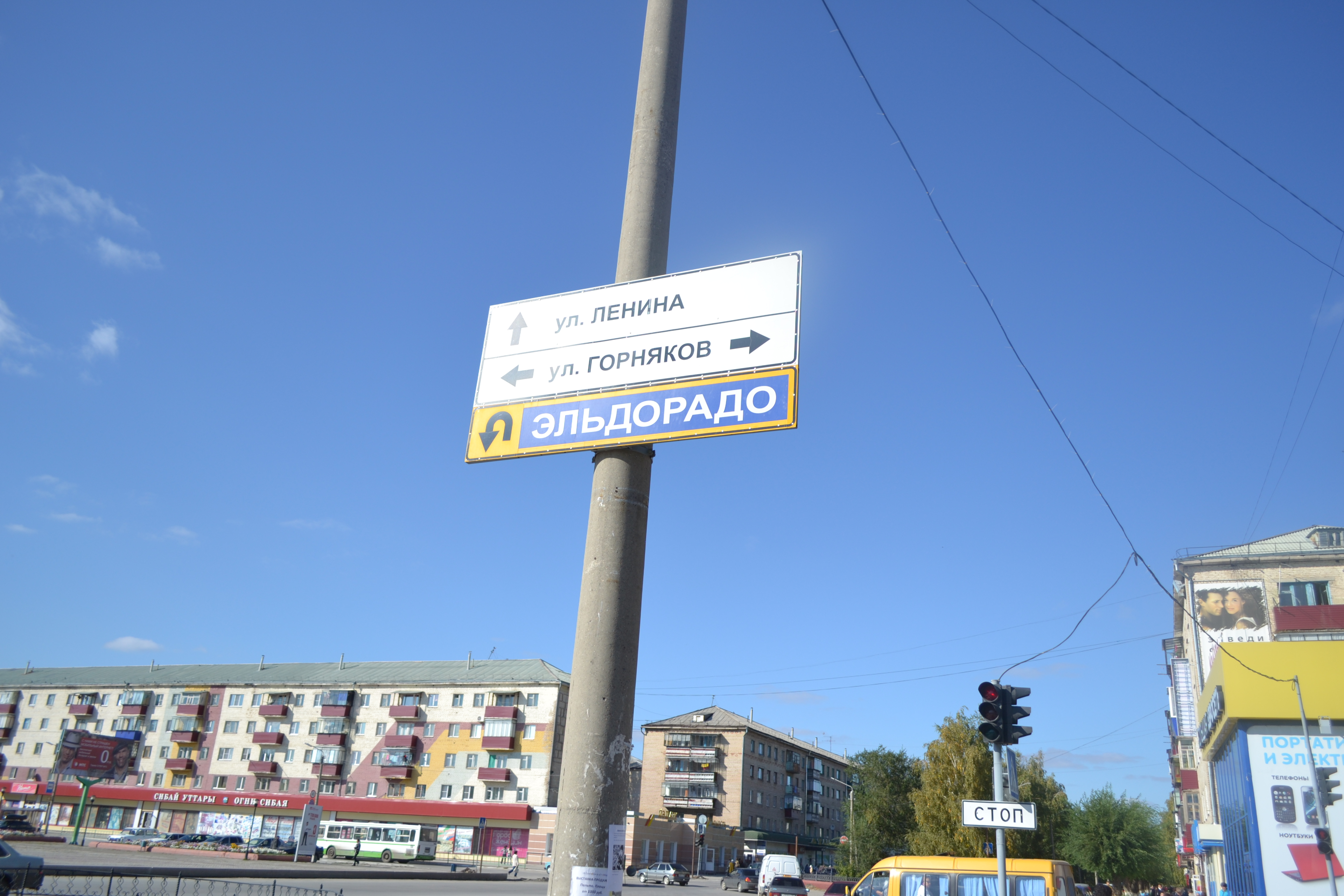
- Street sign in Sibay

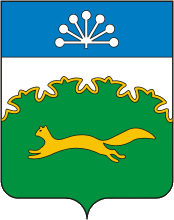
- Flag Coat of arms
- Interactive map of Sibay
- Location of Sibay Sibay (Bashkortostan)
- Coordinates: 52°42′N 58°39′E
- Country: Russia
- Federal subject: Bashkortostan
- Founded: 1840s
- Town status since: November 21, 1955

Government
  - Head: Khalit Suleymanov
- Elevation: 360 m (1,180 ft)

Population (2010 Census)
  - Total: 62,763
  - Estimate (2025): 55,354 (−11.8%)
  - Rank: 254th in 2010

Administrative status
  - Subordinated to: town of republic significance of Sibay
  - Capital of: town of republic significance of Sibay

Municipal status
  - Urban okrug: Sibay Urban Okrug
  - Capital of: Sibay Urban Okrug
- Time zone: UTC+5 (MSK+2)
- Postal codes: 453830–453833, 453837–453840, 453849
- Dialing code: +7 34775
- OKTMO ID: 80743000001
- Town Day: August 18
- Website: sibay-rb.ru

Sibay (Russian: Сиба́й; Bashkir: Сибай) is a town in the Republic of Bashkortostan, Russia, located on the border between Europe and Asia, on the east slope of the Southern Urals, in the spurs of Irendyk, 464 kilometers (288 mi) from Ufa, the capital of the republic. Population: 62,763 (2010 census); 59,082 (2002 census); 47,257 (1989 Soviet census).

== History ==
Sibay was granted urban-type settlement status in 1938. On November 21, 1955, it was granted town status.

== Administrative and municipal status ==
Within the framework of administrative divisions, it is, together with the territory of Tuyalyassky Selsoviet (which comprises the selo of Tuyalyas), incorporated as the town of republic significance of Sibay—an administrative unit with the status equal to that of the districts. As a municipal division, the town of republic significance of Sibay is incorporated as Sibay Urban Okrug.

== Economy ==
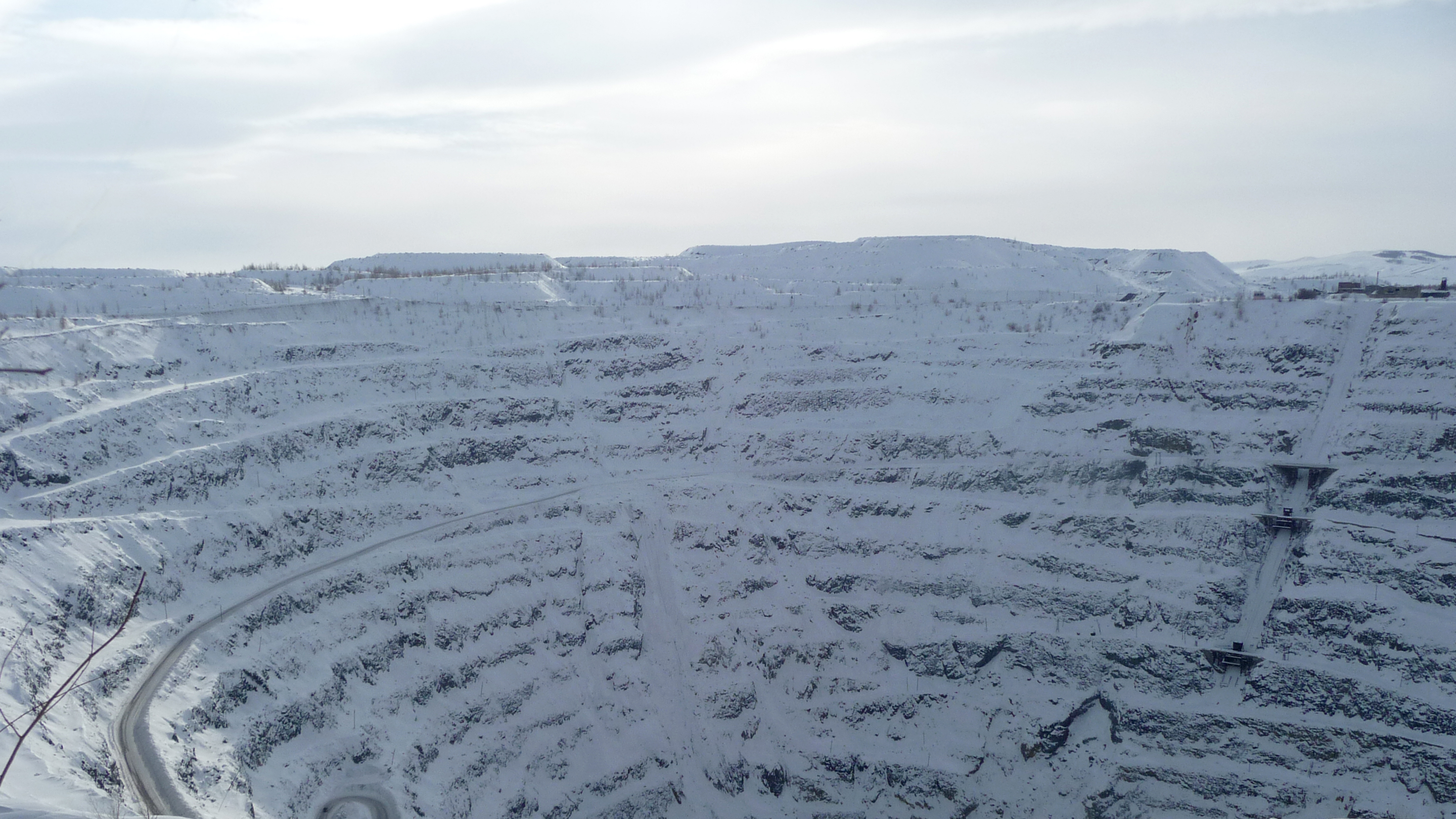
Sibay quarry

Sibay is well known for possessing the deepest open-cast mine in Russia: its colossal copper-zinc quarry is almost 2 kilometers (1.2 mi) wide and 500 meters (1,600 ft) deep.

The town is served by the Sibay Airport.

== Education ==
Sibay is home to the following educational facilities:

1. a branch of Bashkir State University
2. a branch of Bashkir State Agrarian University
3. a branch of Ufa Art College
4. a branch of Ufa College of Radio Electronics
5. Sibay medical school
6. Sibay Trade and Economic College
7. Sibay Teachers College
8. Sibay Polytechnic College

== Demographics ==
Sibay's ethnic composition, as of the 2010 Census, is as follows:

1. Bashkirs: 53.0%
2. Russians: 35.6%
3. Tatars: 8.3%
4. other ethnicities: 3.1%
