= UK railway stations – B =

Station name	Postcode links to map of station at Bing Maps	Station code links to arrivals and departures	Station code links to station information
Bache	CH2 2JF	BAC	BAC
Baglan	SA12 7PA	BAJ	BAJ
Bagshot	GU19 5LX	BAG	BAG
Baildon	BD17 6EU	BLD	BLD
Baillieston	G69 7DH	BIO	BIO
Balcombe	RH17 6JQ	BAB	BAB
Baldock	SG7 5DG	BDK	BDK
Balham	SW12 9SJ	BAL	BAL
Balloch	G83 0UN	BHC	BHC
Ballycarry	BT40 3RA		
Ballymena	BT42 1AD		
Ballymoney	BT53 6JR		
Balmoral	BT9 6GW		
Balmossie	DD5 4QE	BSI	BSI
Bamber Bridge	PR5 6TY	BMB	BMB
Bamford	S33 0BN	BAM	BAM
Banavie	PH33 7PH	BNV	BNV
Banbury	OX16 5AD	BAN	BAN
Bangor (Northern Ireland)	BT20 4JA		
Bangor (Gwynedd)	LL57 1LZ	BNG	BNG
Bangor West	BT20 3GU		
Bank Hall	L20 2AE	BAH	BAH
Banstead	SM7 1PZ	BAD	BAD
Barassie	KA10 6SS	BSS	BSS
Bardon Mill	NE47 7HY	BLL	BLL
Bare Lane	LA4 6RN	BAR	BAR
Bargeddie	G69 7SB	BGI	BGI
Bargoed	CF81 9AL	BGD	BGD
Barking	IG11 8EA	BKG	BKG
Barking Riverside	IG11 0DS	BGV	BGV
Barming	ME16 9NS	BMG	BMG
Barmouth	LL42 1LS	BRM	BRM
Barnehurst	DA7 6HQ	BNH	BNH
Barnes	SW13 0HT	BNS	BNS
Barnes Bridge	SW13 0AQ	BNI	BNI
Barnetby	DN38 6DG	BTB	BTB
Barnham	PO22 0JD	BAA	BAA
Barnhill	G21 4NA	BNL	BNL
Barnsley	S70 1SD	BNY	BNY
Barnstaple	EX31 2BP	BNP	BNP
Barnt Green	B45 8JZ	BTG	BTG
Barrhead	G78 1GG	BRR	BRR
Barrhill	KA26 0QF	BRL	BRL
Barrow Haven	DN19 7ET	BAV	BAV
Barrow-in-Furness	LA14 5AE	BIF	BIF
Barrow-upon-Soar	LE12 8XE	BWS	BWS
Barry	CF62 7AE	BRY	BRY
Barry Docks	CF63 4JP	BYD	BYD
Barry Island	CF62 5TH	BYI	BYI
Barry Links	DD7 7RZ	BYL	BYL
Barton-on-Humber	DN18 5JR	BAU	BAU
Basildon	SS16 5XX	BSO	BSO
Basingstoke	RG21 5NE	BSK	BSK
Bat & Ball	TN13 3ST	BBL	BBL
Bath Spa	BA1 1SX	BTH	BTH
Bathgate	EH48 1NU	BHG	BHG
Batley	WF17 5TA	BTL	BTL
Battersby	TS9 6LS	BTT	BTT
Battersea Park	SW8 4ND	BAK	BAK
Battle	TN33 0DE	BAT	BAT
Battlesbridge	SS11 7RJ	BLB	BLB
Bayford	SG13 8PL	BAY	BAY
Beaconsfield	HP9 2PJ	BCF	BCF
Bearley	B95 6DR	BER	BER
Bearsden	G61 4AN	BRN	BRN
Bearsted	ME14 4PH	BSD	BSD
Beasdale	PH39 4NR	BSL	BSL
Beaulieu Park	CM3 3HN	BPA	BPA
Beaulieu Road	SO42 7YQ	BEU	BEU
Beauly	IV4 7EP	BEL	BEL
Bebington	CH62 5HR	BEB	BEB
Beccles	NR34 9QW	BCC	BCC
Beckenham Hill	SE6 3RE	BEC	BEC
Beckenham Junction	BR3 1HY	BKJ	BKJ
Bedford	MK40 1DS	BDM	BDM
Bedford St Johns	MK42 9ER	BSJ	BSJ
Bedhampton	PO9 1LL	BDH	BDH
Bedlington	NE22 5YR	BEJ	BEJ
Bedminster	BS3 4LU	BMT	BMT
Bedworth	CV12 8JF	BEH	BEH
Bedwyn	SN8 3NZ	BDW	BDW
Beeston	NG9 1JH	BEE	BEE
Bekesbourne	CT4 5EF	BKS	BKS
Belfast Grand Central	BT12 5AX		
Belfast Lanyon Place	BT1 3NR		
Bellarena	BT49 0JZ		
Belle Vue	M18 7BR	BLV	BLV
Bellgrove	G31 1AD	BLG	BLG
Bellingham	SE6 3BX	BGM	BGM
Bellshill	ML4 1RH	BLH	BLH
Belmont	SM2 6BW	BLM	BLM
Belper	DE56 1FX	BLP	BLP
Beltring	ME18 6BZ	BEG	BEG
Belvedere	DA17 6JW	BVD	BVD
Bempton	YO15 1HN	BEM	BEM
Ben Rhydding	LS29 8PL	BEY	BEY
Benfleet	SS7 1NF	BEF	BEF
Bentham	LA2 7LJ	BEN	BEN
Bentley (Hampshire)	GU10 5LB	BTY	BTY
Bentley (South Yorkshire)	DN5 0BE	BYK	BYK
Bere Alston	PL20 7ER	BAS	BAS
Bere Ferrers	PL20 7LT	BFE	BFE
Berkhamsted	HP4 2JU	BKM	BKM
Berkswell	CV7 7EF	BKW	BKW
Bermuda Park	CV10 7JS	BEP	BEP
Berney Arms	NR30 1SB	BYA	BYA
Berry Brow	HD4 7LX	BBW	BBW
Berrylands	KT5 8LT	BRS	BRS
Berwick	BN26 6TA	BRK	BRK
Berwick-upon-Tweed	TD15 1NF	BWK	BWK
Bescar Lane	L40 9QP	BES	BES
Bescot Stadium	WS1 4NH	BSC	BSC
Betchworth	RH3 7BZ	BTO	BTO
Bethnal Green	E1 5RE	BET	BET
Betws-y-Coed	LL24 0AE	BYC	BYC
Beverley	HU17 0AS	BEV	BEV
Bewdley	DY12 1DP	BEW	BEW
Bexhill	TN38 8AB	BEX	BEX
Bexley	DA5 1AQ	BXY	BXY
Bexleyheath	DA7 4AA	BXH	BXH
Bicester North	OX26 6EF	BCS	BCS
Bicester Village	OX26 6HU	BIT	BIT
Bickley	BR1 2BX	BKL	BKL
Bidston	CH43 7RF	BID	BID
Biggleswade	SG18 8AN	BIW	BIW
Bilbrook	WV8 1HT	BBK	BBK
Billericay	CM12 9ED	BIC	BIC
Billingham	TS23 4AU	BIL	BIL
Billingshurst	RH14 9SP	BIG	BIG
Bingham	NG13 8TF	BIN	BIN
Bingley	BD16 2NA	BIY	BIY
Birchgrove	CF14 4SY	BCG	BCG
Birchington-on-Sea	CT7 9HY	BCH	BCH
Birchwood	WA3 7PU	BWD	BWD
Birkbeck	SE20 7YA	BIK	BIK
Birkdale	PR8 4AF	BDL	BDL
Birkenhead Central	CH41 9DB	BKC	BKC
Birkenhead Hamilton Square	CH41 1AL	BKQ	BKQ
Birkenhead North	CH41 7AY	BKN	BKN
Birkenhead Park	CH41 8AT	BKP	BKP
Birmingham International	B40 1PA	BHI	BHI
Birmingham Moor Street	B4 7UL	BMO	BMO
Birmingham New Street	B2 4QA	BHM	BHM
Birmingham Snow Hill	B3 2DX	BSW	BSW
Bishop Auckland	DL14 6AB	BIA	BIA
Bishopbriggs	G64 2RD	BBG	BBG
Bishop's Stortford	CM23 5NF	BIS	BIS
Bishopstone	BN25 2QP	BIP	BIP
Bishopton	PA7 5AA	BPT	BPT
Bitterne	SO18 1GG	BTE	BTE
Blackburn	BB1 1EY	BBN	BBN
Blackheath	SE3 9LG	BKH	BKH
Blackhorse Road	E17 6JJ	BHO	BHO
Blackpool North	FY1 2AB	BPN	BPN
Blackpool Pleasure Beach	FY4 1LD	BPB	BPB
Blackpool South	FY4 1DW	BPS	BPS
Blackridge	EH48 3BW	BKR	BKR
Blackrod	BL6 5JE	BLK	BLK
Blackwater	GU17 9AF	BAW	BAW
Blaenau Ffestiniog	LL41 3HE	BFF	BFF
Blair Atholl	PH18 5SG	BLA	BLA
Blairhill	ML5 2EW	BAI	BAI
Blake Street	B74 4YD	BKT	BKT
Blakedown	DY10 3JL	BKD	BKD
Blantyre	G72 9BG	BLT	BLT
Blaydon	NE21 5BS	BLO	BLO
Bleasby	NG14 7GD	BSB	BSB
Bletchley	MK3 6DS	BLY	BLY
Bloxwich	WS3 2LF	BLX	BLX
Bloxwich North	WS3 2UB	BWN	BWN
Blundellsands & Crosby	L23 8TJ	BLN	BLN
Blyth Bebside	NE24 4HX	BLI	BLI
Blythe Bridge	ST11 9JR	BYB	BYB
Bodmin Parkway	PL30 4BB	BOD	BOD
Bodorgan	LL62 5BL	BOR	BOR
Bognor Regis	PO21 1BS	BOG	BOG
Bogston	PA15 2TN	BGS	BGS
Bolton	BL3 6DD	BON	BON
Bolton-upon-Dearne	S63 8JB	BTD	BTD
Bond Street	W1R 1FE	BDS	BDS
Bookham	KT23 3JG	BKA	BKA
Bootle	LA19 5XB	BOC	BOC
Bootle New Strand	L20 4BA	BNW	BNW
Bootle Oriel Road	L20 7AD	BOT	BOT
Bordesley	B11 1AX	BBS	BBS
Borough Green & Wrotham	TN15 8AJ	BRG	BRG
Borth	SY24 5HT	BRH	BRH
Bosham	PO18 8NH	BOH	BOH
Boston	PE21 8RN	BSN	BSN
Botanic	BT7 17Q		
Botley	SO30 2DN	BOE	BOE
Bottesford	NG13 0DN	BTF	BTF
Bourne End	SL8 5YP	BNE	BNE
Bournemouth	BH8 8AP	BMH	BMH
Bournville	B30 2LT	BRV	BRV
Bow Brickhill	MK17 9JN	BWB	BWB
Bow Street	SY24 5AT	BOW	BOW
Bowes Park	N11 2QR	BOP	BOP
Bowling	G60 5BL	BWG	BWG
Box Hill & Westhumble	RH5 6BT	BXW	BXW
Bracknell	RG12 1HX	BCE	BCE
Bradford Forster Square	BD1 4HY	BDQ	BDQ
Bradford Interchange	BD1 1JY	BDI	BDI
Bradford on Avon	BA15 1DQ	BOA	BOA
Brading	PO36 0EB	BDN	BDN
Braintree	CM7 3FW	BTR	BTR
Braintree Freeport	CM7 8YH	BTP	BTP
Bramhall	SK7 2DY	BML	BML
Bramley (Hampshire)	RG26 5DZ	BMY	BMY
Bramley (West Yorkshire)	LS13 4DS	BLE	BLE
Brampton (Cumbria)	CA8 1HW	BMP	BMP
Brampton (Suffolk)	NR34 8EF	BRP	BRP
Branchton	PA16 0YB	BCN	BCN
Brandon	IP27 0BA	BND	BND
Branksome	BH12 1DF	BSM	BSM
Braystones	CA21 2YW	BYS	BYS
Bredbury	SK6 2AG	BDY	BDY
Breich	EH55 8JH	BRC	BRC
Brent Cross West	NW2 6LW	BCZ	BCZ
Brentford	TW8 8DT	BFD	BFD
Brentwood	CM14 4EW	BRE	BRE
Bricket Wood	AL2 3PQ	BWO	BWO
Bridge of Allan	FK9 4NA	BEA	BEA
Bridge of Orchy	PA36 4AD	BRO	BRO
Bridgend	CF31 1BB	BGN	BGN
Bridgeton	G40 1BN	BDG	BDG
Bridgwater	TA6 5HB	BWT	BWT
Bridlington	YO16 4LZ	BDT	BDT
Brierfield	BB9 5PG	BRF	BRF
Brigg	DN20 8HX	BGG	BGG
Brighouse	HD6 1HF	BGH	BGH
Brighton	BN1 3ZE	BTN	BTN
Brimsdown	EN3 7JL	BMD	BMD
Brinnington	SK5 8JG	BNT	BNT
Bristol Parkway	BS34 8PU	BPW	BPW
Bristol Temple Meads	BS1 6QG	BRI	BRI
Brithdir	NP24 6XY	BHD	BHD
Briton Ferry	SA11 2PB	BNF	BNF
Brixton	SW9 8JW	BRX	BRX
Broad Green	L14 3NG	BGE	BGE
Broadbottom	SK14 3LH	BDB	BDB
Broadstairs	CT10 2AJ	BSR	BSR
Brockenhurst	SO42 7TW	BCU	BCU
Brockholes	HD7 7BG	BHS	BHS
Brockley	SE4 2RW	BCY	BCY
Bromborough	CH63 0JR	BOM	BOM
Bromborough Rake	CH62 7AR	BMR	BMR
Bromley Cross	BL2 3AD	BMC	BMC
Bromley North	BR1 3JH	BMN	BMN
Bromley South	BR1 1NX	BMS	BMS
Bromsgrove	B60 2DZ	BMV	BMV
Brondesbury	NW6 7QB	BSY	BSY
Brondesbury Park	NW6 6RP	BSP	BSP
Brookmans Park	AL9 7SS	BPK	BPK
Brookwood	GU24 0EU	BKO	BKO
Broome	SY7 0NT	BME	BME
Broomfleet	HU15 1RQ	BMF	BMF
Brora	KW9 6QU	BRA	BRA
Brough	HU15 1EB	BUH	BUH
Broughty Ferry	DD5 2AE	BYF	BYF
Broxbourne	EN10 7AW	BXB	BXB
Bruce Grove	N17 6QX	BCV	BCV
Brundall	NR13 5PJ	BDA	BDA
Brundall Gardens	NR13 5RG	BGA	BGA
Brunstane	EH15 2NQ	BSU	BSU
Brunswick	L8 6XP	BRW	BRW
Bruton	BA10 0DX	BRU	BRU
Bryn	WN4 0AS	BYN	BYN
Buckenham	NR13 4HW	BUC	BUC
Buckley	CH7 3AY	BCK	BCK
Bucknell	SY7 0AD	BUK	BUK
Buckshaw Parkway	PR7 7EY	BSV	BSV
Bugle	PL26 8QG	BGL	BGL
Builth Road	LD2 3PY	BHR	BHR
Bulwell	NG7 7EF	BLW	BLW
Bures	CO8 5DQ	BUE	BUE
Burgess Hill	RH15 0AA	BUG	BUG
Burley Park	LS4 2LX	BUY	BUY
Burley-in-Wharfedale	LS29 7AA	BUW	BUW
Burnage	M20 6FH	BNA	BNA
Burneside	LA9 6QZ	BUD	BUD
Burnham	SL1 6JT	BNM	BNM
Burnham-on-Crouch	CM0 8DG	BUU	BUU
Burnley Barracks	BB12 0LX	BUB	BUB
Burnley Central	BB11 1DA	BNC	BNC
Burnley Manchester Road	BB11 4HY	BYM	BYM
Burnside	G73 3UE	BUI	BUI
Burntisland	KY3 9DU	BTS	BTS
Burscough Bridge	L40 0TQ	BCB	BCB
Burscough Junction	L40 5XF	BCJ	BCJ
Bursledon	SO31 8AA	BUO	BUO
Burton Joyce	NG14 5AP	BUJ	BUJ
Burton-on-Trent	DE14 2DJ	BUT	BUT
Bury St Edmunds	IP32 6AL	BSE	BSE
Busby	G76 8HY	BUS	BUS
Bush Hill Park	EN1 1BA	BHK	BHK
Bushey	WD1 4EA	BSH	BSH
Butlers Lane	B74 4RT	BUL	BUL
Buxted	TN22 4LA	BXD	BXD
Buxton	SK17 6AQ	BUX	BUX
Byfleet & New Haw	KT15 3LQ	BFN	BFN
Bynea	SA14 9TL	BYE	BYE

== See also ==
- List of heritage railway stations in the United Kingdom
