= Northumberland Heath =

Area of southeast London

Coordinates: 51.4727°N 0.1679°E

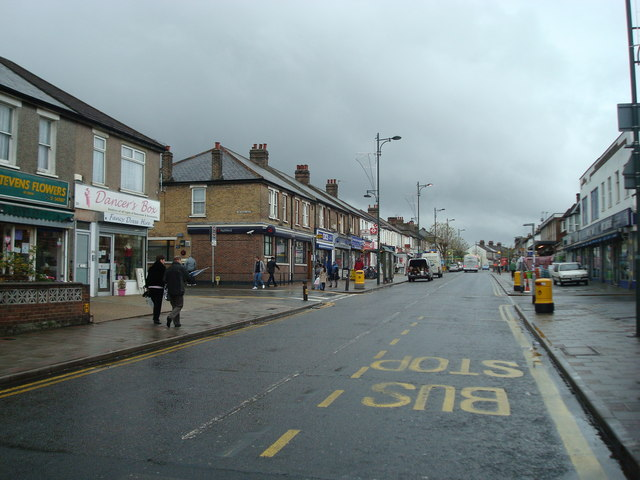
- Bexley Road

- Location within Greater London
- Population: 10,598 (2011 Census. Ward)
- OS grid reference: TQ505771
- London borough: Bexley
- Ceremonial county: Greater London
- Region: London
- Country: England
- Sovereign state: United Kingdom
- Post town: ERITH
- Postcode district: DA8
- Dialling code: 01322
- Police: Metropolitan
- Fire: London
- Ambulance: London
- UK Parliament: Bexleyheath and Crayford; Erith and Thamesmead
- London Assembly: Bexley and Bromley

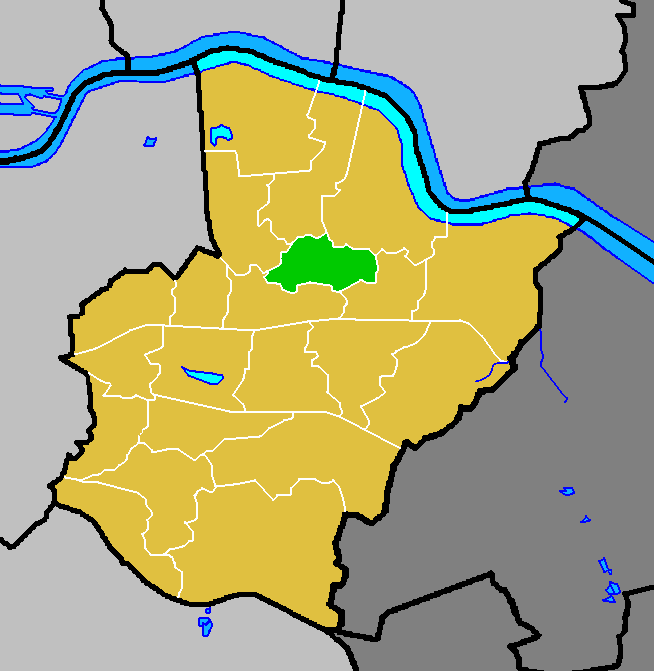
Northumberland Heath ward (green) within the London Borough of Bexley (yellow)

Northumberland Heath is an area of South East London, England within the London Borough of Bexley. It is located south of Erith and north of Bexleyheath.

== History ==
The area was once known as Spike Island after the workhouse that was situated there, spike being the slang term for a workhouse at the time, taking the name from the implement used to unravel rope offcuts to be used for boat caulking, a chore undertaken by the able bodied inmates. The area is mainly residential although there is a large industrial bakery in Belmont Road. Much of the housing stock is Victorian with some 1940s council developments and a Cottage estate built for local Vickers armaments workers in 1916. Nearest Railway stations are Erith and Barnehurst. There is a large Catholic church in Bexley Road, Our Lady of the Angels with a Capuchin friary attached, and a Church of England (St Paul's) in Mill Road. A conservation area on Brook Street safeguards some terraces that represent early examples of municipal housing.

== Amenities ==
Northumberland Heath has a Community Forum (a kind of Parish Council).

The Erith Rugby Club is based in Northumberland Heath.

The European SF Society (Eurocon) Award-winning webzine, the Science Fact & Science Fiction Concatenation was founded by former locals of Northumberland Heath, some of whom have established a local SF group.

Northumberland Heath has an active community library which serves as one of the main foci of community activities.

== Politics ==
Northumberland Heath is within Northumberland Heath ward (local Councillors are John Fuller (Conservative, Cabinet Member for Education) and Wendy Perfect (Labour, Deputy Leader of the Labour Group and Shadow Cabinet Member for Education).

== Transport and locale ==
=== Nearest places ===
- Belvedere
- Slade Green
- Bexleyheath
- Barnehurst

=== Places of worship ===
- Our Lady of the Angels Catholic Church, Erith
- Northumberland Heath Baptist Church
- St Paul's Church Mill Road

=== Rail ===
The nearest stations are at Slade Green and Erith on the Woolwich line and Barnehurst on the Bexleyheath line. Trains run between London Charing Cross, or London Cannon Street and Dartford. On the Bexleyheath line there is also a 6-day train service to London Victoria.

=== Buses ===
Transport for London operate three bus routes.

Route 89 runs between Lewisham and Slade Green stations; The 89 has a frequency of 10 minutes Monday to Saturday daytime and, in the evenings and on Sundays, a frequency of 20 minutes. In the early mornings a night bus service operates called the N89 which runs between Trafalgar Square and Erith; The N89 operates to a frequency of every 30 minutes.

Route 229 runs between Queen Mary's Hospital, Sidcup and Thamesmead Town Centre; The 229 has a frequency of 10 minutes Monday to Saturday daytime, and in the evenings and on Sundays a frequency of 15 minutes.

Route B12 runs between Erith and Joydens Wood via Bexleyheath station and the shopping centres of Bexleyheath and Bexley village. The B12 has a daytime frequency of 20 minutes Monday to Saturday daytime, and in the evenings a frequency of 30 minutes. This bus started running on Sundays since 29 April 2013. The first bus from Joydens Wood will depart at 6.50am and the last bus at 11.50pm. Meanwhile, the first departure from Bexley Road in Erith will be at 7.12am and the last bus at 12.10am the following Monday morning. The bus has a frequency of 30 minutes all day through until Monday morning.
