= CLASP (British Rail) =

Prefabricated buildings scheme

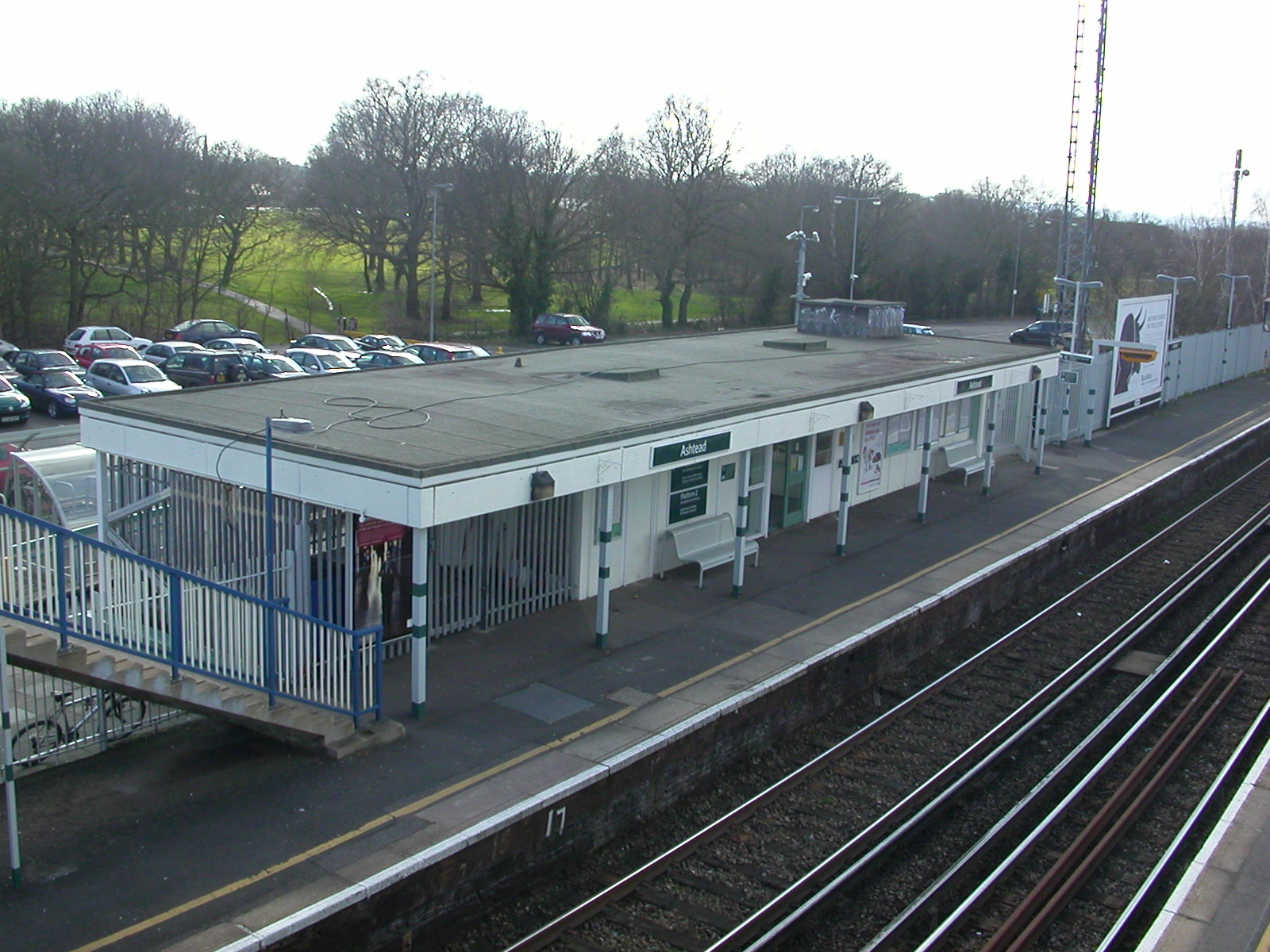
CLASP structure at Ashtead

The CLASP (Consortium of Local Authorities Special Programme) system was a scheme developed in the 1950s by English local authorities to devise a method of designing and assembling prefabricated buildings for use in the public sector. The former Southern Region of British Rail, the state-owned railway operator, adopted the system in the 1960s and 1970s and used it for signalboxes and station buildings. The Western Region also rebuilt some stations using the same methods.

== History ==
After the Second World War, many stations and signalboxes on the Southern Region's large and busy network required renewal or replacement, but funds were limited: several electrification schemes had to be paid for, new trains were required and other modernisation work was taking place. By the 1960s, the need for immediate action became so great that the Region's management had to abandon traditional individual rebuilding projects in favour of a mass-produced solution using factory-made parts.

The CLASP method, used since the 1950s by local authorities for schools and other public buildings, was chosen. The prefabricated buildings were made of steel and concrete, and had several distinctive characteristics: a steel-framed, flat-roofed "box", usually one storey high (although some two-storey versions were produced), with a large water tank mounted on the roof. Windows were small and placed high on the building, immediately below the roof. Evenly spaced wooden or metal pillars held up canopies which were usually wood-panelled underneath. Pre-formed panels of aggregate-coated concrete formed the outer walls.

The first CLASP signalboxes were built in 1964; in 1965, the scope was widened to include stations. The structures were cheaply built and quickly decayed; several were soon replaced by new buildings. The Southern Region abandoned the scheme in 1973, although the Western Region adopted it at three locations between 1971 and 1977.

== List of stations rebuilt using CLASP methods ==
Station	Image	Region	Year	Notes	Refs
Sunbury		Southern Region	1965		
Fleet		Southern Region	1966	Rebuilt 2013–2014	
Crawley		Southern Region	1967	Incorporated an office development above	
Alfreton		London Midland Region	1967		
Ashtead		Southern Region	1968	Rebuilt 2013	
Aylesham		Southern Region	1968		
Belmont	–	Southern Region	1968	Now demolished	
Belvedere	–	Southern Region	1968	Rebuilt in 2000	
Charlton		Southern Region	1968		
Crayford	–	Southern Region	1968	Destroyed by fire in 2000; replaced by new building in 2001	
New Eltham	–	Southern Region	1968	Since rebuilt	
Slade Green		Southern Region	1968		
Berrylands		Southern Region	1969		
Hampton Wick		Southern Region	1969		
Catford		Southern Region	1970		
Poole	–	Southern Region	1970	Since rebuilt	
Oxford	–	Western Region	1971	Up side rebuilt 1990; down side scheduled for replacement	
Longfield		Southern Region	1971		
Meopham		Southern Region	1971		
Bristol Parkway	–	Western Region	1972	Opened 1 May 1972 with temporary CLASP buildings; rebuilt in 2001	
Kidbrooke	–	Southern Region	1972	Since rebuilt	
Rainham (Kent)	–	Southern Region	1972	Demolished in 1989; rebuilt in 1990	
East Grinstead		Southern Region	1973	New station built 2012; demolished in 2013	
Hassocks		Southern Region	1973	Rebuilt 2012–2013	
Sunningdale		Southern Region	1973		
Virginia Water		Southern Region	1973		
Wokingham		Southern Region	1973	Rebuilt 2013	
West Norwood		Southern Region	1975		
Gloucester		Western Region	1977	Incorporated an office development above	
Lower Sydenham	–	Southern Region		Since rebuilt	
Strood		Southern Region		Rebuilt 2017	
Forest Hill		Southern Region			
Brockley		Southern Region		An unusual two-storey CLASP structure	
Wool		Southern Region			

== SCOLA ==
The SCOLA (Second Consortium of Local Authorities) scheme, similar to CLASP, was also developed for use by schools. Its buildings made use of brick and timber instead of concrete. British Rail used it twice on the Southern Region, when Newington and Teynham stations were rebuilt in the late 1970s to suit one-man operation.

== Post-1970s developments ==
From 1980 and throughout the next ten years and into the 1990s, British Rail adopted a new system of brick buildings with apex roofs, smaller examples resembling a 'chalet'. These include Headcorn, Staplehurst and Marden.
