= Abbey Wood railway station =

Railway station in London, England

Abbey Wood
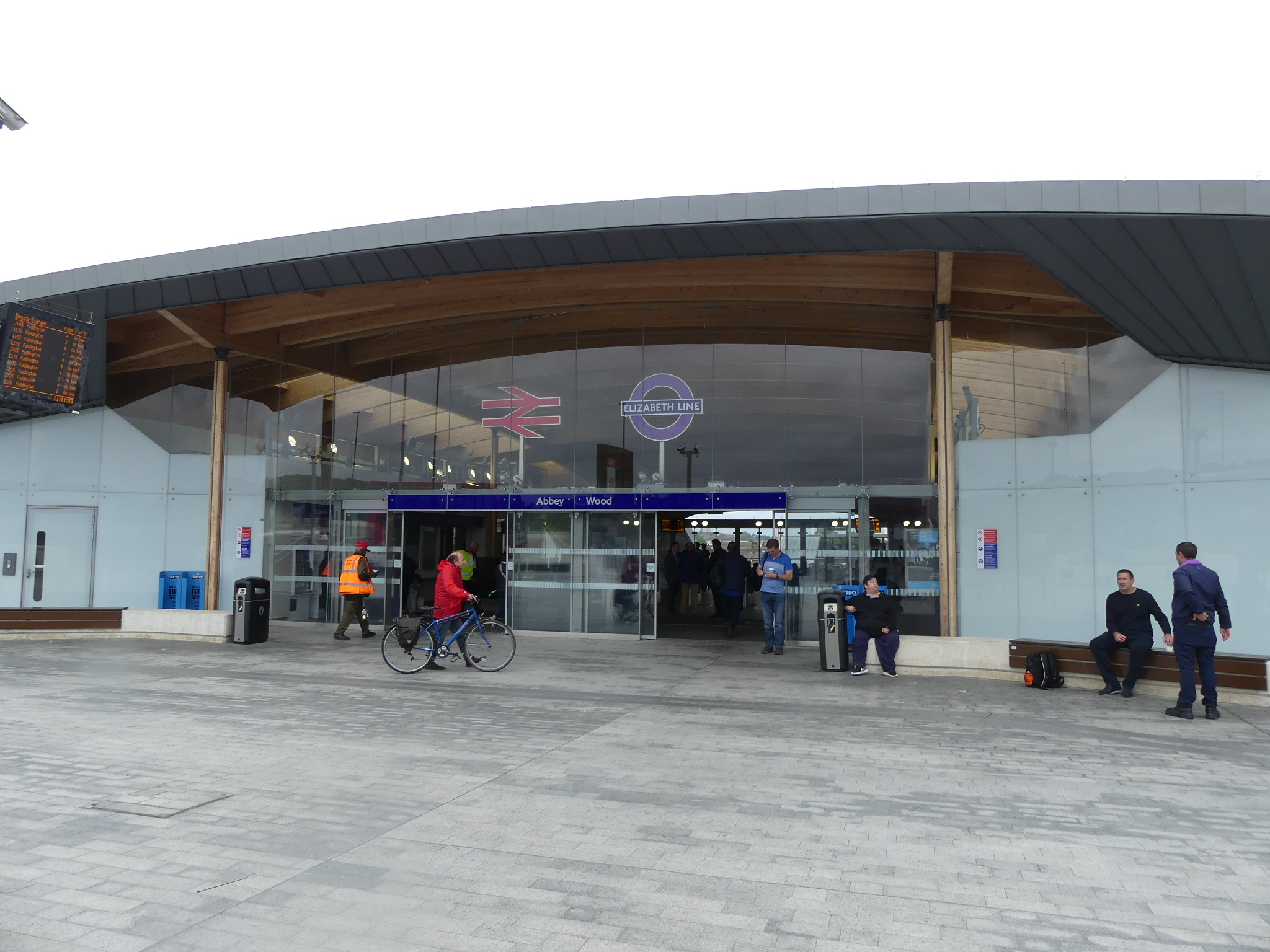
- Station entrance in May 2022
- Interactive map of Abbey Wood

General information
- Location: Abbey Wood
- Local authority: London Borough of Bexley; Royal Borough of Greenwich
- Grid reference: TQ473789
- Managed by: Elizabeth line
- Owner: Transport for London; Network Rail
- Station code: ABW
- Number of platforms: 4
- Accessible: Yes
- Fare zone: 4

National Rail annual entry and exit
- 2020–21: ▼1.413 million
- 2021–22: ▲2.638 million
- 2022–23: ▲7.119 million
- 2023–24: ▲10.655 million
- Interchange: 1.889 million
- 2024–25: ▲11.874 million
- Interchange: ▼1.879 million

Railway companies
- Original company: South Eastern Railway
- Pre-grouping: South Eastern and Chatham Railway
- Post-grouping: Southern Railway

Key dates
- 30 July 1849: Original station opened
- 23 October 2017: Crossrail station opened (Southeastern only)
- 24 May 2022: Elizabeth line services commenced

Other information
- External links: Departures; Facilities
- Coordinates: 51.4910°N 0.1214°E

Abbey Wood is a major National Rail and Elizabeth line interchange station in Abbey Wood, south-east London, England. It lies between Plumstead and Belvedere on the North Kent Line, 11 miles 43 chains (18.6 km) from London Charing Cross. Services run via the Greenwich and Lewisham routes into central London, while Elizabeth line services operate to Paddington, Heathrow Airport and Reading via Canary Wharf and Liverpool Street. It is in London fare zone 4.

The station is managed by Transport for London (Elizabeth line) and served by Southeastern, Thameslink and the Elizabeth line. It is the nearest station to Thamesmead, linked by local bus services. The station entrance is located within the London Borough of Bexley, while the platforms are in the Royal Borough of Greenwich.

== History ==
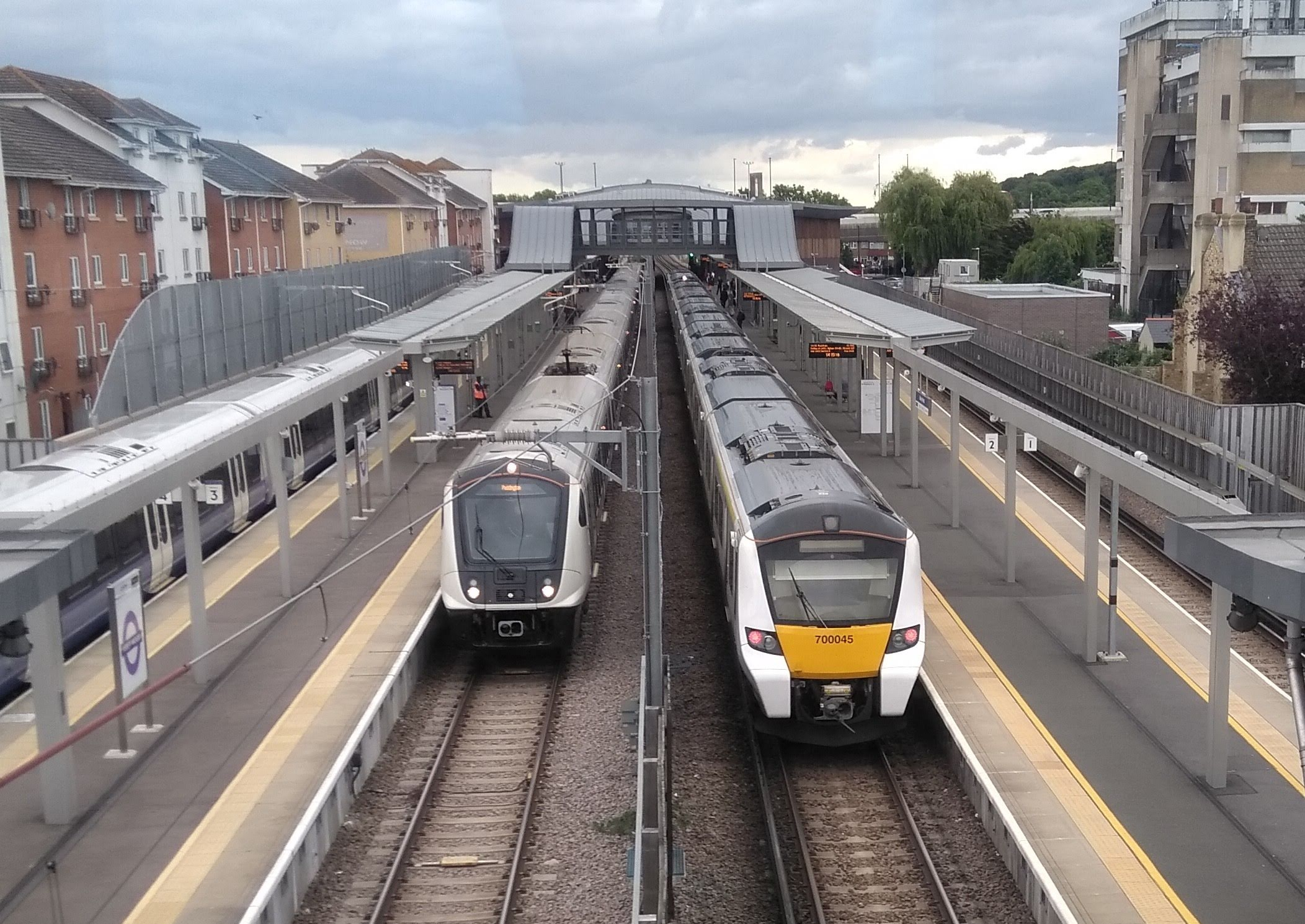
An Elizabeth line Class 345 (left) alongside a Thameslink Class 700 at Abbey Wood in 2022

Abbey Wood station opened on 30 July 1849 under the South Eastern Railway.The original 1849 station was a brick building typical of the South Eastern Railway, with metal platform canopies. During the 1860s, William Morris regularly travelled from Abbey Wood to his home, Red House in Bexleyheath, often with guests from the Arts and Crafts movement.

In 1899 it came under the control of the South Eastern and Chatham Railway, before becoming part of the Southern Railway at the 1923 grouping. Following nationalisation in 1948 it was operated by the Southern Region of British Railways, and later by Network SouthEast until the privatisation of British Rail.

The station has been rebuilt twice in the last 50 years. A replacement station opened in 1987. This was itself demolished in 2014 to make way for the current station, built by Network Rail for Crossrail. The new station opened on 23 October 2017, designed by architects Fereday Pollard. It provides step-free access throughout and an integrated bus interchange on Harrow Manorway. The station was equipped with the APTIS ticketing system by November 1986, making it among the first in the country to use the technology.

In the 2000s, the station was identified as an interchange on the planned Greenwich Waterfront Transit, but the project was cancelled in 2009 due to funding constraints. The station's location on the boundary between the Royal Borough of Greenwich and the London Borough of Bexley is sometimes reflected in controversies relating to development, planning and regeneration, such as the October 2025 decision of the Mayor of London to overturn Bexley Council's refusal of planning permission for a 25-storey residential tower block near the station.

Abbey Wood is the eastern terminus of one of the two Elizabeth line branches. It provides an interchange between the Elizabeth line and national rail services on the North Kent line.

== Passenger volume ==
Passenger entries and exits at Abbey Wood
Year	Entries and exits
2019–20	3,825,206
2020–21	1,412,638
2021–22	2,638,456
2022–23	7,118,664

== Services ==
=== Southeastern and Thameslink ===
Services are operated using Classes Class 376, Class 465, Class 466, Class 700 and Class 707 electric multiple units.

The typical off-peak service is:

- 4 tph to London Cannon Street (2 via Greenwich, 2 via Lewisham)
- 2 tph to Luton via Greenwich
- 2 tph to Barnehurst, returning to Cannon Street via Bexleyheath and Lewisham
- 2 tph to Dartford
- 2 tph to Rainham via Chatham

=== Elizabeth line ===
Services are operated using Class 345 electric multiple units.

The typical off-peak service is:

- 4 tph to Maidenhead (2 continuing to Reading)
- 4 tph to Heathrow Terminal 4

Preceding station	National Rail	Following station
Plumstead	Southeastern North Kent Line	Belvedere
Plumstead	Thameslink North Kent Line	Slade Green
Preceding station	Elizabeth line	Following station
Woolwich towards Reading or Heathrow Terminal 4	Elizabeth line	Terminus
	Historical railways	
Church Manor Way Halt Line open, station closed	South Eastern and Chatham Railway North Kent Line	Belvedere Line and station open

== Connections ==
Abbey Wood is served by several London Buses routes, including night services N1 and N472.

== Future ==
=== London Overground ===
An extension of the London Overground from Barking across the Thames to Thamesmead and Abbey Wood was proposed in 2015. The section from Barking to Barking Riverside opened in 2022, but further extension is not currently planned.

Instead, in 2019, Transport for London and the Greater London Authority proposed a Docklands Light Railway extension to Thamesmead and Abbey Wood, citing higher benefits, lower cost and more suitable gradients for Thames crossing compared to an Overground link.

=== Elizabeth line ===
Safeguarding exists for an eastward extension from Abbey Wood towards Gravesend and Hoo Junction. Proposals have also been made to extend services to Ebbsfleet International, though capacity constraints on existing lines present challenges.

== Gallery ==
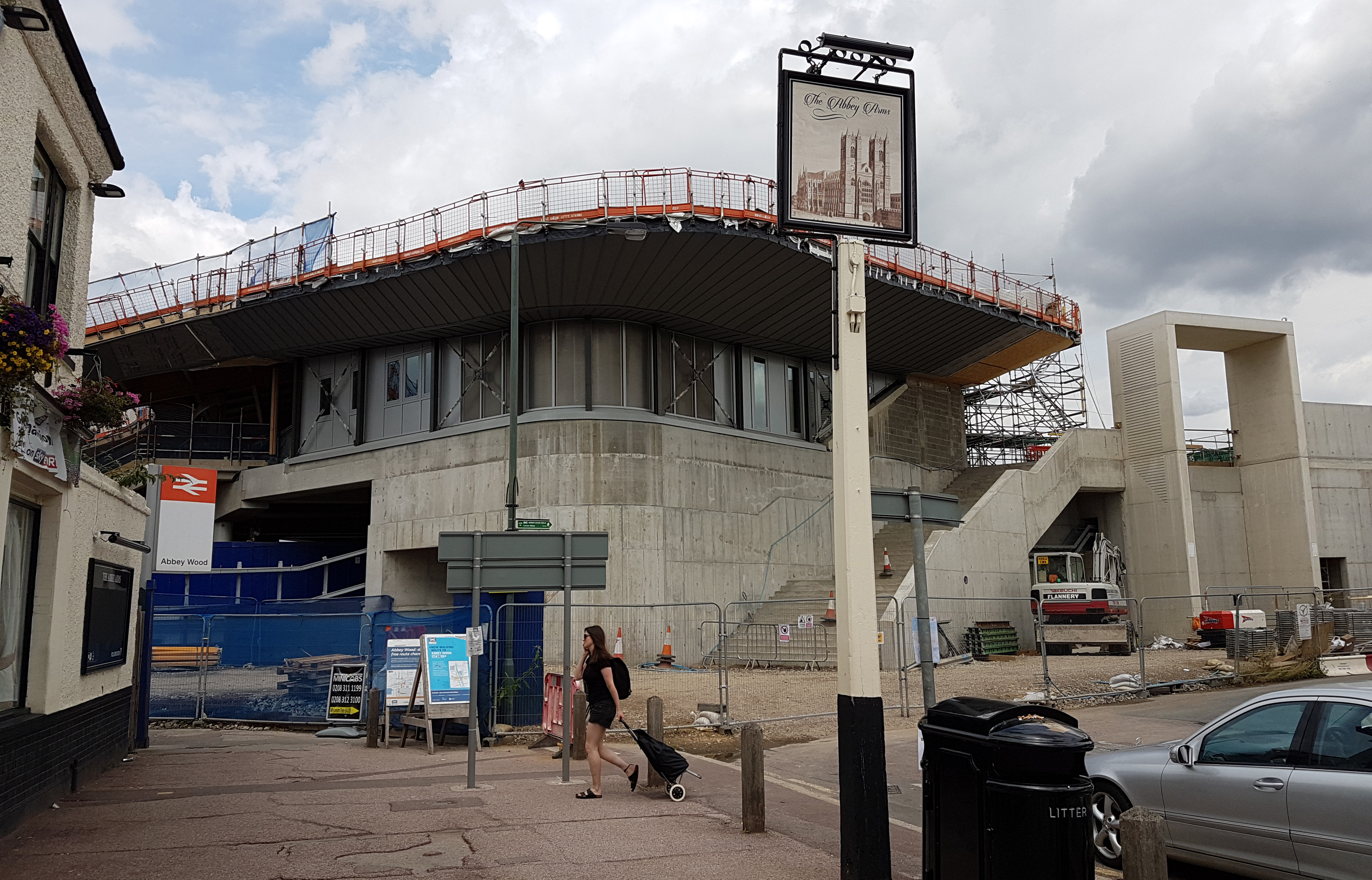
Construction of the new station in 2017

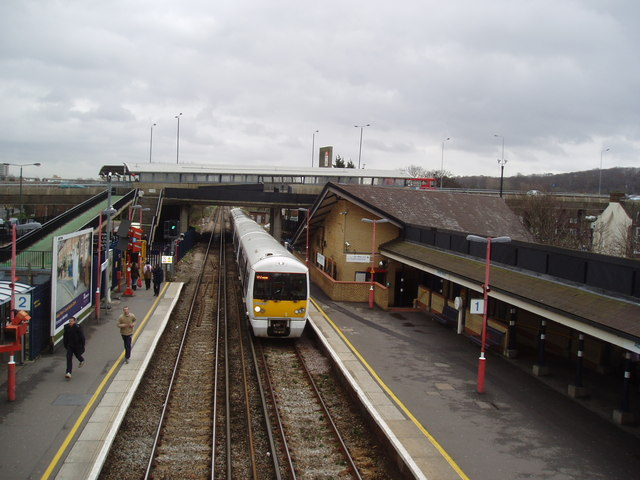
Platform view in 2006

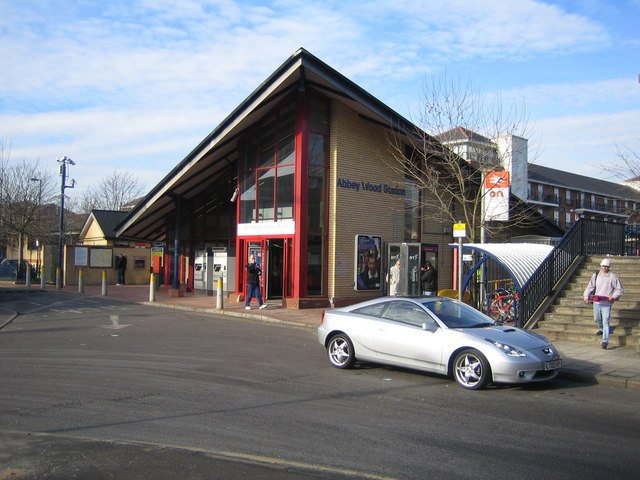
The old station building in 2007
