= Erith railway station =

National Rail station in London, England

Erith
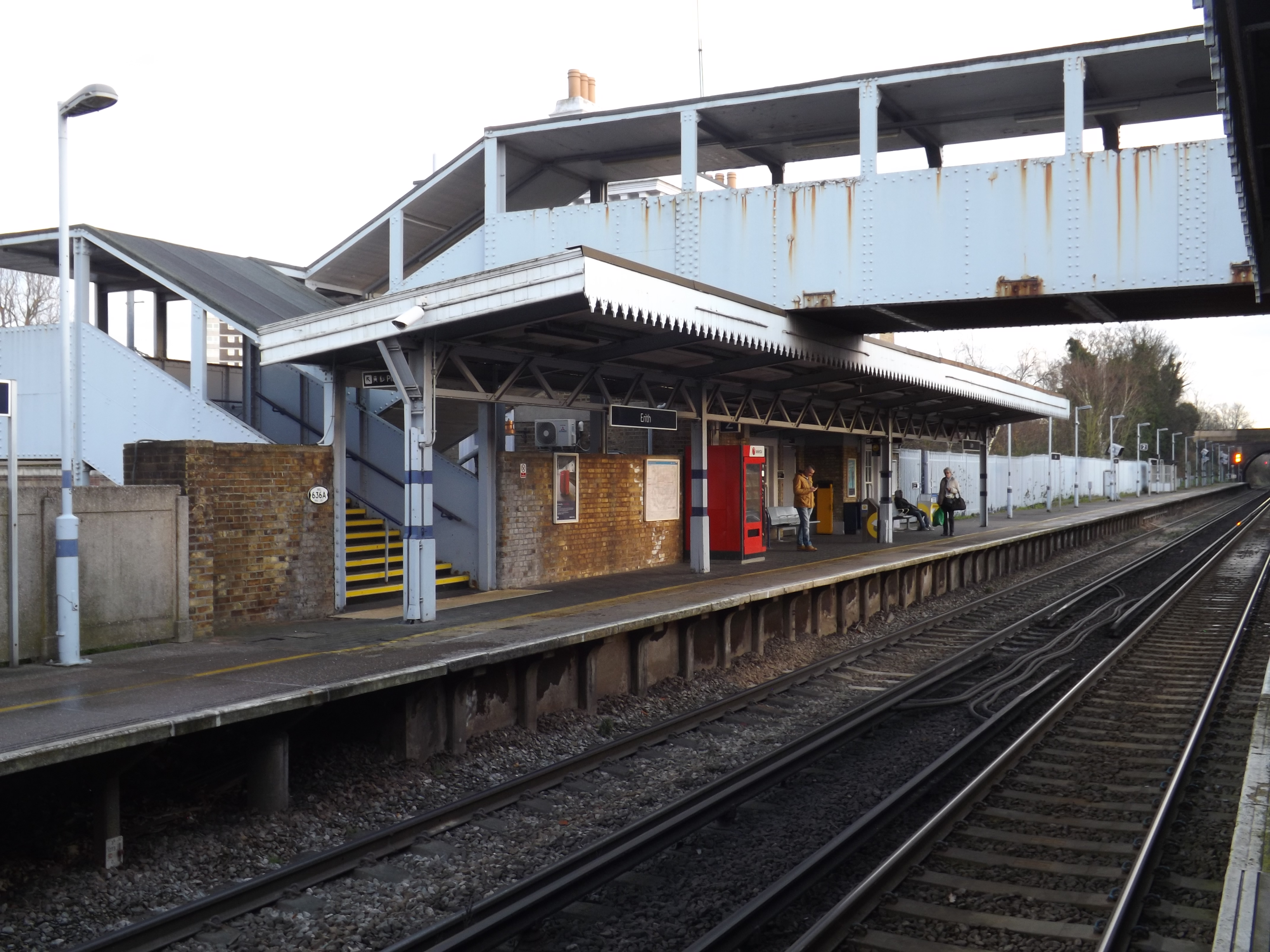
- Interactive map of Erith

General information
- Location: Erith
- Local authority: London Borough of Bexley
- Managed by: Southeastern
- Station code: ERH
- DfT category: E
- Number of platforms: 2
- Fare zone: 6

National Rail annual entry and exit
- 2020–21: ▼0.308 million
- 2021–22: ▲0.653 million
- 2022–23: ▲0.790 million
- 2023–24: ▼0.789 million
- 2024–25: ▼0.740 million

Key dates
- 30 July 1849: Opened

Other information
- External links: Departures; Facilities
- Coordinates: 51.4816°N 0.1754°E

Erith station serves Erith in the London Borough of Bexley, southeast London. It is 14 miles 18 chains (22.9 km) measured from London Charing Cross.

The station stands between Belvedere and Slade Green on the North Kent line and is served by Greenwich line trains running from the station westbound generally to Cannon Street via London Bridge and eastbound to Dartford or to Central London via the Dartford loop and Sidcup.

The station buildings date from the opening of the line in 1849.

== Services ==
All services at Erith are operated by Southeastern using Class 376, 465, 466 and 707 EMUs.

The typical off-peak service in trains per hour is:

- 4 tph to London Cannon Street (2 of these run via Greenwich and 2 run via Lewisham)
- 2 tph to Barnehurst, returning to London Cannon Street via Bexleyheath and Lewisham
- 2 tph to Dartford

Additional services, including trains to and from London Cannon Street via Sidcup call at the station during the peak hours.

Preceding station	National Rail	Following station
Belvedere	Southeastern North Kent Line	Slade Green

== Connections ==
London Buses routes 99, 180, 229 and 469 serve the station.
