= BLH =

BLH can refer to:

- Baldwin-Lima-Hamilton
- Bellshill station - see UK railway stations - B
- Blythe Airport, IATA code BLH
- Brotha Lynch Hung, American hip hop artist
- Bad Left Hook, an online boxing forum run by SB Nation
