= Blackheath railway station =

National Rail station in London, England

Blackheath
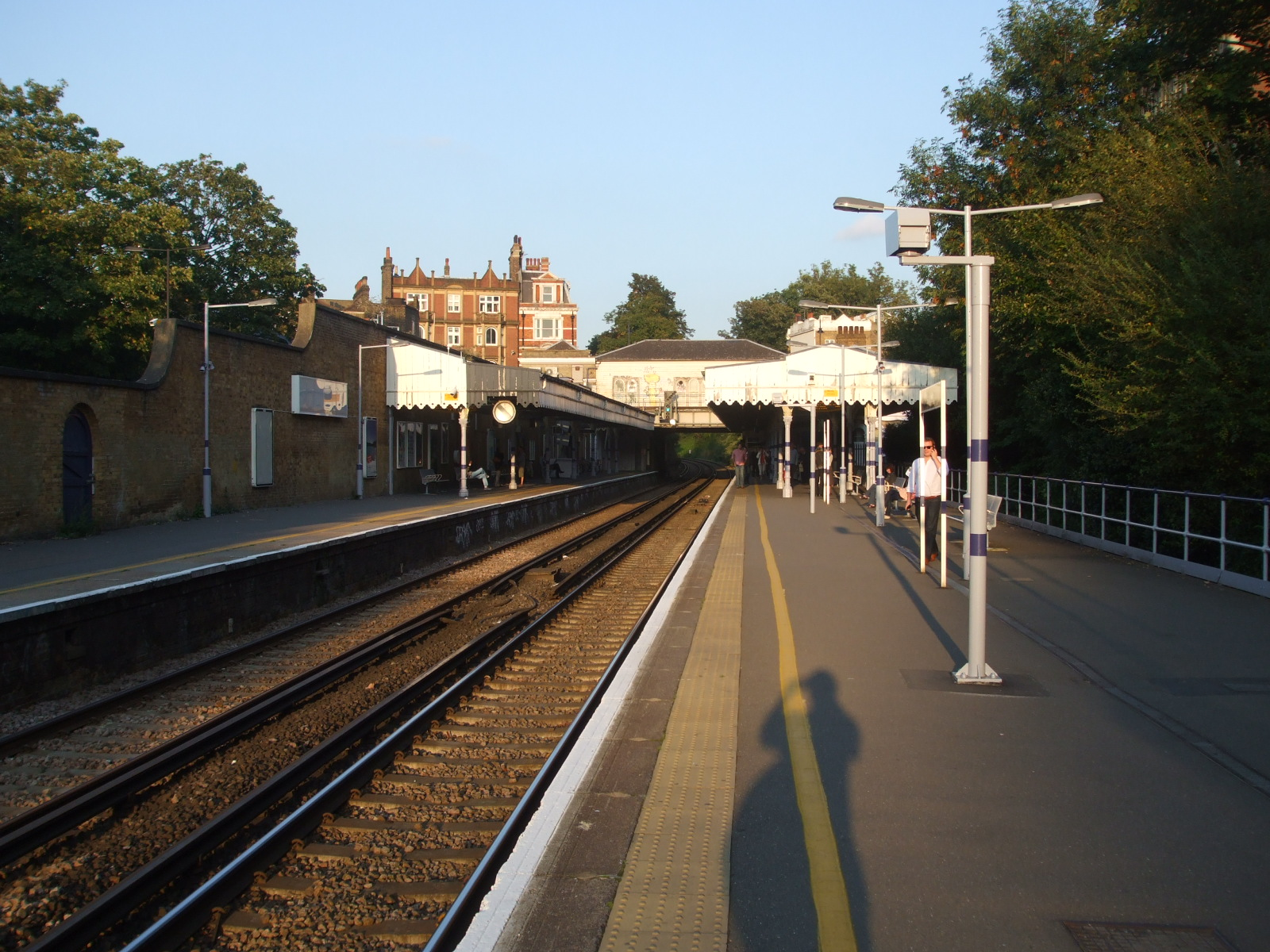
- Interactive map of Blackheath

General information
- Location: Blackheath
- Local authority: London Borough of Lewisham
- Managed by: Southeastern
- Station code: BKH
- DfT category: C2
- Number of platforms: 2
- Accessible: Yes
- Fare zone: 3

National Rail annual entry and exit
- 2020–21: ▼0.767 million
- Interchange: ▼6,163
- 2021–22: ▲1.833 million
- Interchange: ▲12,920
- 2022–23: ▲2.070 million
- Interchange: ▼4,047
- 2023–24: ▲2.210 million
- Interchange: ▲6,420
- 2024–25: ▲2.279 million
- Interchange: ▲7,933

Key dates
- 30 July 1849: Opened

Listed status
- Listed feature: Blackheath Railway Station
- Listing grade: II
- Entry number: 1358479
- Added to list: 12 March 1973

Other information
- External links: Departures; Facilities
- Coordinates: 51.4658°N 0.0089°E

Blackheath railway station is Grade II-listed and is in the south-centre of Blackheath, a village in southeast London. In traditional terms the area immediately south-west of the station around Lee Terrace and Lee Park is part of Lee; a status challenged by the station's naming, buildings such as the Blackheath Halls and the development of Blackheath Park to the south east. It is 8 miles 52 chains (13.9 km) measured from London Victoria.

The tracks run through the village and are crossed by a road overbridge on which the station buildings stand.

The station also had a refurbish in 2025.

== Station ==
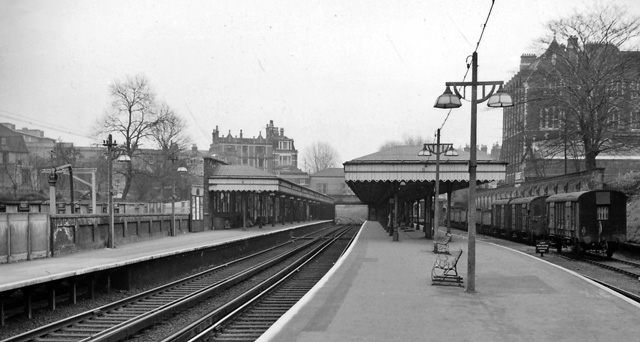
View eastward, towards Dartford in 1962

Much of the original station, dating back at track level to 1849 and at ticket office level to 1879, still remains today. It was built using London bricks to a design by George Smith (who also built Greenwich station). At the "country" end of the platforms the lines branch off to the North Kent and Bexleyheath lines. The former passes through the one mile long (1.6km) Blackheath Tunnel immediately after the junction; the latter through the shorter Kidbrooke Tunnel after a short cutting.

Blackheath's station has two platforms which are partially covered with a weather canopy. Glass and metal waiting shelters were erected on the London ends of both platforms in April 2018. The upside platform has a disused platform face (bay platform) facing towards London, which was used in the past by commuter trains terminating here. Unusually, the track in the bay platform still remains in situ, although it is now heavily overgrown and otherwise obstructed. The area to the north, now a car park, was originally an area of railway sidings, where the commuter trains were stabled when out of service.

The bay platform used to come into its own when a circus was taking place on Blackheath. Many of the animals would arrive in railway box vans. The circus would then proceed through Blackheath Village on to the heath.

The station cannot be relied upon as a way of reaching Blackheath during the traditional free fireworks display in November, as it is normally closed early on that day for safety reasons. Conversely, in April, on the Sunday of the London Marathon, it is crucial in enabling athletes and their supporters to reach the starting line, as on that day bus services across the heath are usually suspended as the roads are closed.

Blackheath Halls, run by Trinity Laban Conservatoire of Music and Dance, and The Conservatoire are approximately 100m south of the station.

== Collision in Blackheath Tunnel ==
On 16 December 1864, six wagons from a ballast train travelling from Charlton became detached from the rear of the train and were run into by an express passenger train from Maidstone, wrecking the train. Five platelayers in the wagons were killed in the collision and many passengers were injured. A sixth platelayer and the passenger train's fireman died from their injuries later.

== Services ==
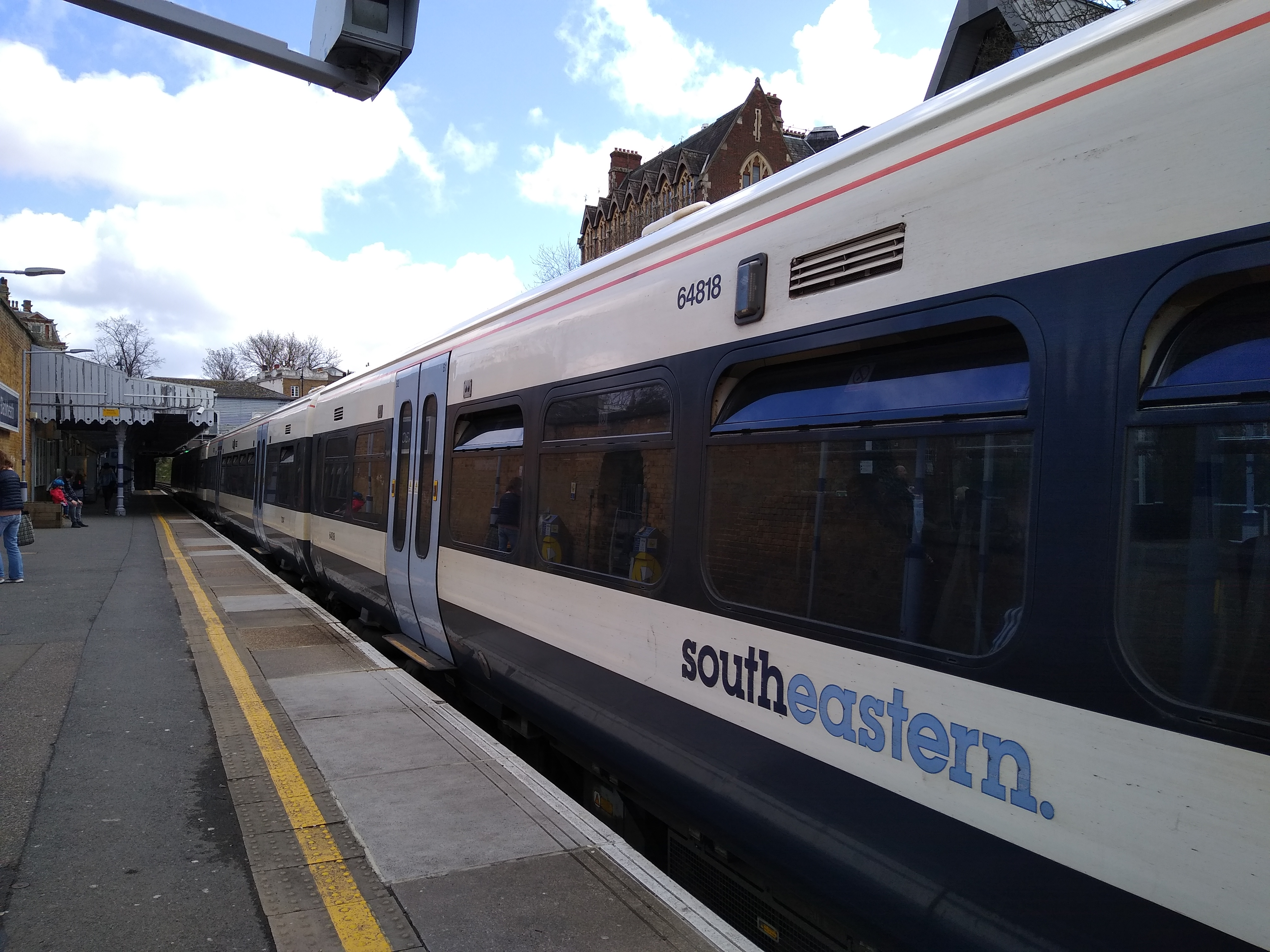
A Southeastern train at the station

All services at Blackheath are operated by Southeastern using Class 376, 465, 466 and 707 EMUs.

The typical off-peak service in trains per hour is:

- 2 tph to London Victoria
- 1 tph to London Charing Cross
- 4 tph to London Cannon Street
- 2 tph to Slade Green via Bexleyheath, continuing to London Cannon Street via Woolwich Arsenal and Greenwich
- 3 tph to Dartford via Bexleyheath of which 2 continue to Gravesend
- 2 tph to Dartford via Woolwich Arsenal

Additional services call at the station during the peak hours.

Preceding station	National Rail	Following station
Lewisham	Southeastern North Kent Line	Charlton
Lewisham	Southeastern Bexleyheath Line	Kidbrooke

== Facilities ==
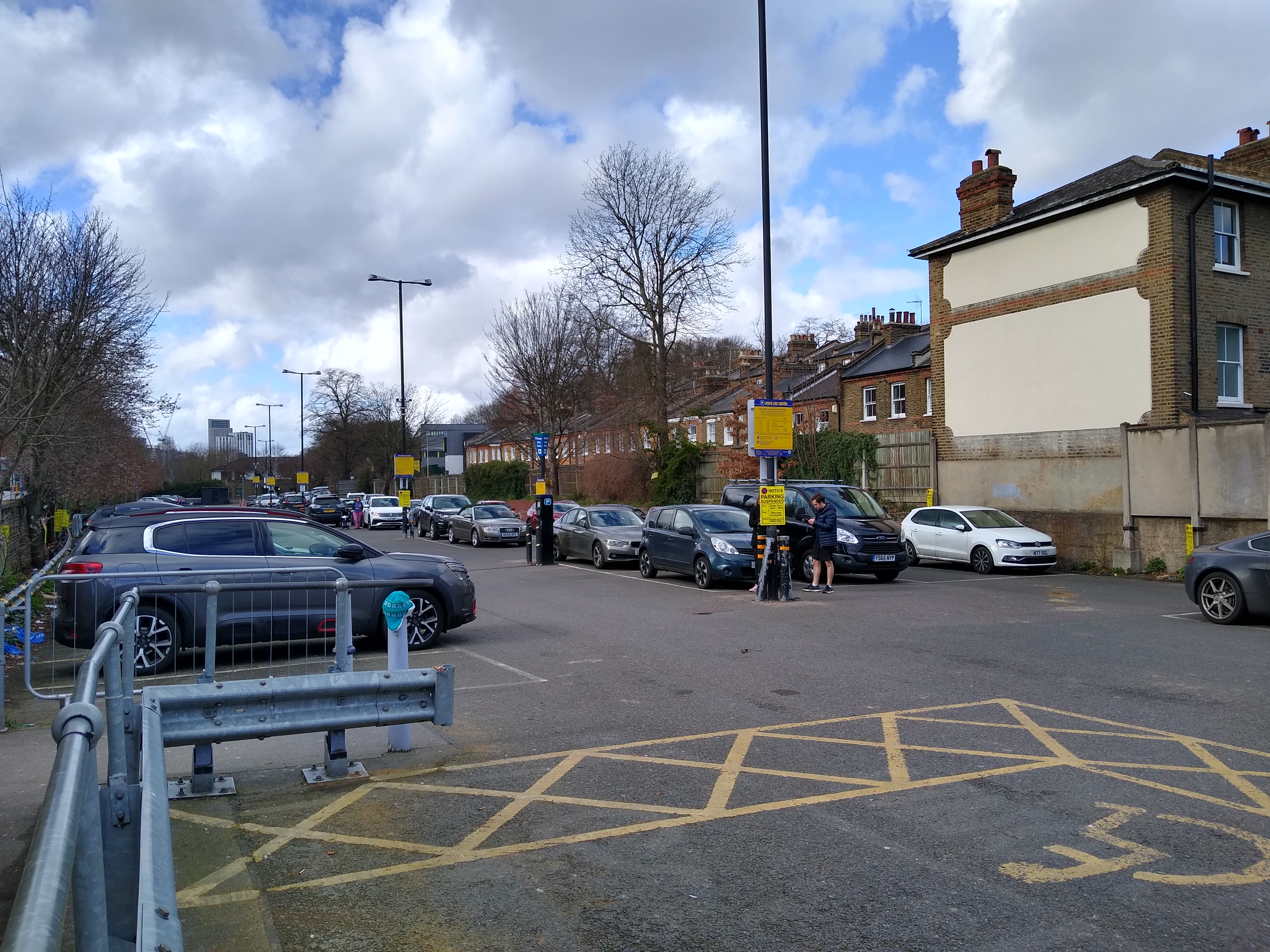
Car park at the station

There is an adjacent car park to the north of the station (with 205 spaces) and another nearby off Blackheath Grove. Both are managed by the local authority. Charges apply 365 days a year at all times.

== Connections ==
London Buses routes 54, 89, 108, 202, SL4 and night route N89 serve the station.
