= Bargeddie railway station (North British Railway) =

Former railway station in Scotland

Bargeddie

General information
- Location: Bargeddie, North Lanarkshire; Scotland
- Coordinates: 55.8592°N 4.0779°W
- Grid reference: NS700648
- Platforms: 2

Other information
- Status: Disused

History
- Original company: North British Railway
- Post-grouping: LNER

Key dates
- 1 February 1871: Opened as Cuilhill
- 1 April 1904: Renamed as Bargeddie
- 1 January 1917: Closed
- 1 February 1919: Reopened
- 24 September 1927: Closed
Location

Bargeddie was a railway station in the village of Bargeddie, North Lanarkshire, Scotland. It was opened as Cuilhill, by the North British Railway on 1 February 1871. It was renamed Bargeddie on 1 April 1904.

The station closed to passengers on 24 September 1927.

Preceding station	Historical railways	Following station
Blairhill; Line and Station open	Coatbridge Branch; North British Railway	Easterhouse; Line and Station open
