= Easterhouse railway station =

Railway station in Glasgow, Scotland

Easterhouse Scottish Gaelic: An Taigh Sear
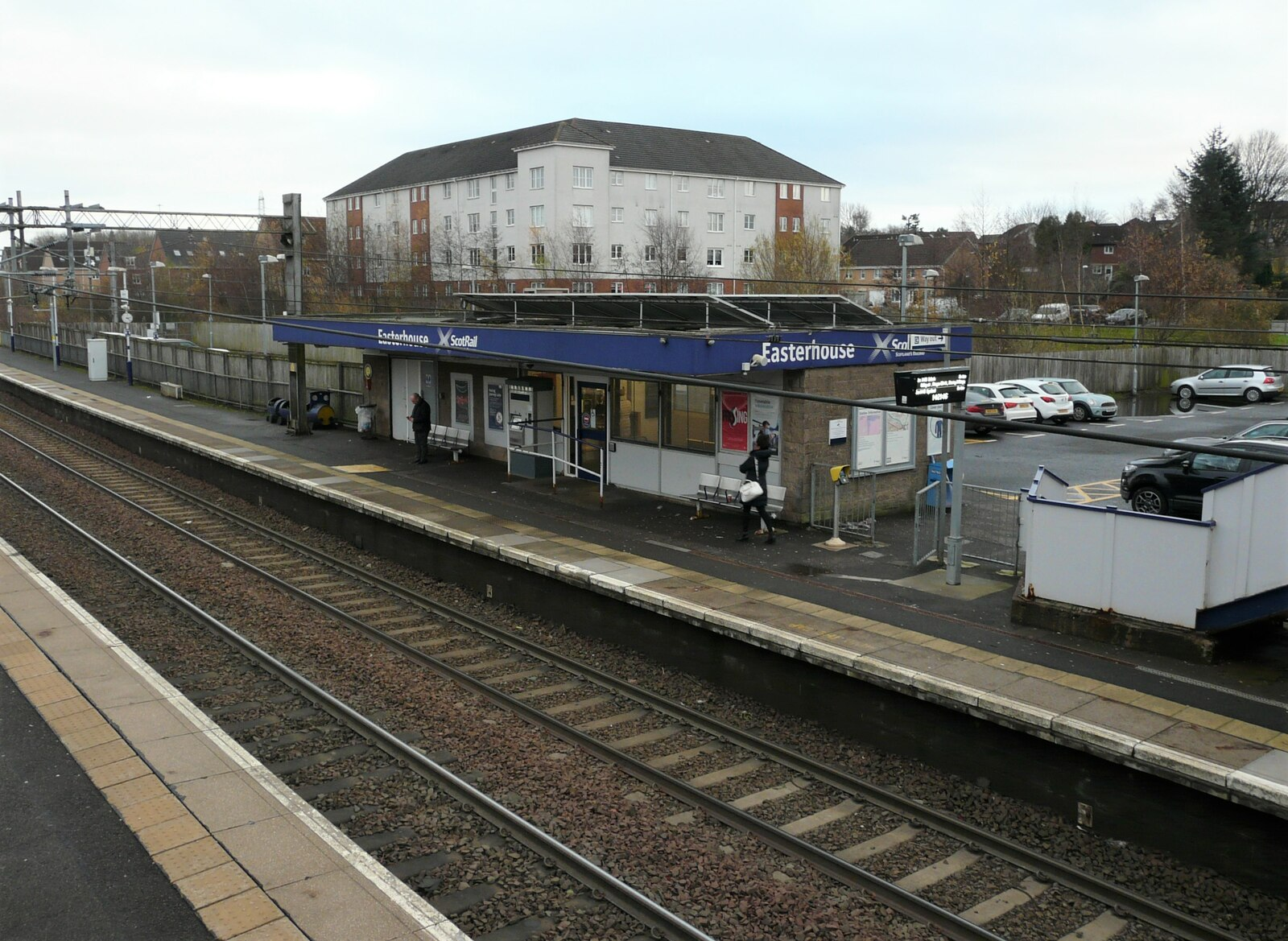

General information
- Location: Easterhouse, Glasgow; Scotland
- Coordinates: 55.8599°N 4.1066°W
- Grid reference: NS682649
- Managed by: ScotRail
- Platforms: 2

Other information
- Station code: EST

History
- Original company: Coatbridge Bridge, NBR
- Post-grouping: LNER

Key dates
- 1 February 1871: Opened

Passengers
- 2020/21: ▼0.042 million
- 2021/22: ▲0.177 million
- 2022/23: ▲0.231 million
- 2023/24: ▲0.292 million
- 2024/25: ▲0.317 million
Location
Notes
- Passenger statistics from the Office of Rail and Road

Easterhouse railway station serves the Easterhouse area of Glasgow, Scotland. It was built by the North British Railway as part of their Coatbridge Branch and opened when the branch opened on 1 February 1871. The station is 5¾ miles (9 km) east of Glasgow Queen Street railway station on the North Clyde Line and is managed by ScotRail.

== Daily services ==
Monday to Saturday daytimes:

- Half-hourly service towards Edinburgh Waverley
- Half-hourly service towards Airdrie
- Half-hourly service towards Balloch via Glasgow Queen Street Low Level
- Half-hourly service towards Helensburgh Central via Glasgow Queen Street Low Level (as of August 2016 this service no longer calls at Shettleston, Cartyne and Bellgrove. Passengers for these stations have to use the half-hourly service towards Balloch instead.)

Evening services are as follows:

- Half-hourly service towards Airdrie via all stations
- Half-hourly service towards Balloch via Glasgow Queen Street Low Level

Sunday services are as follows:

- Half-hourly service towards Edinburgh Waverley
- Half-hourly service towards Helensburgh Central

Preceding station	National Rail	Following station
Blairhill	ScotRail; North Clyde Line	Garrowhill
	Historical railways	
Bargeddie (NBR); Line open; Station closed	Coatbridge Branch; North British Railway	Garrowhill; Line and Station open

== Rolling stock ==
The current rolling stock operating the North Clyde Lines are Class 320s, Class 318 and Class 334.

== Previous operations ==
From the 1960s after electrification by British Railways, both Class 311s and Class 303s operated the North Clyde Lines. During a fleet cascade it was common to find a Class 314, Class 311 or Class 303. During the 1990s the Class 320s were introduced to the North Clyde Lines. The Class 311s were then withdrawn and both Class 303s and 320s operated together until 2002 when the final Class 303 unit was withdrawn. The Class 334s then entered service. Initially, the units were set for the Ayrshire Lines but they operated the North Clyde lines during peak-hour times.
