= London Buses route 89 =

London bus route

89
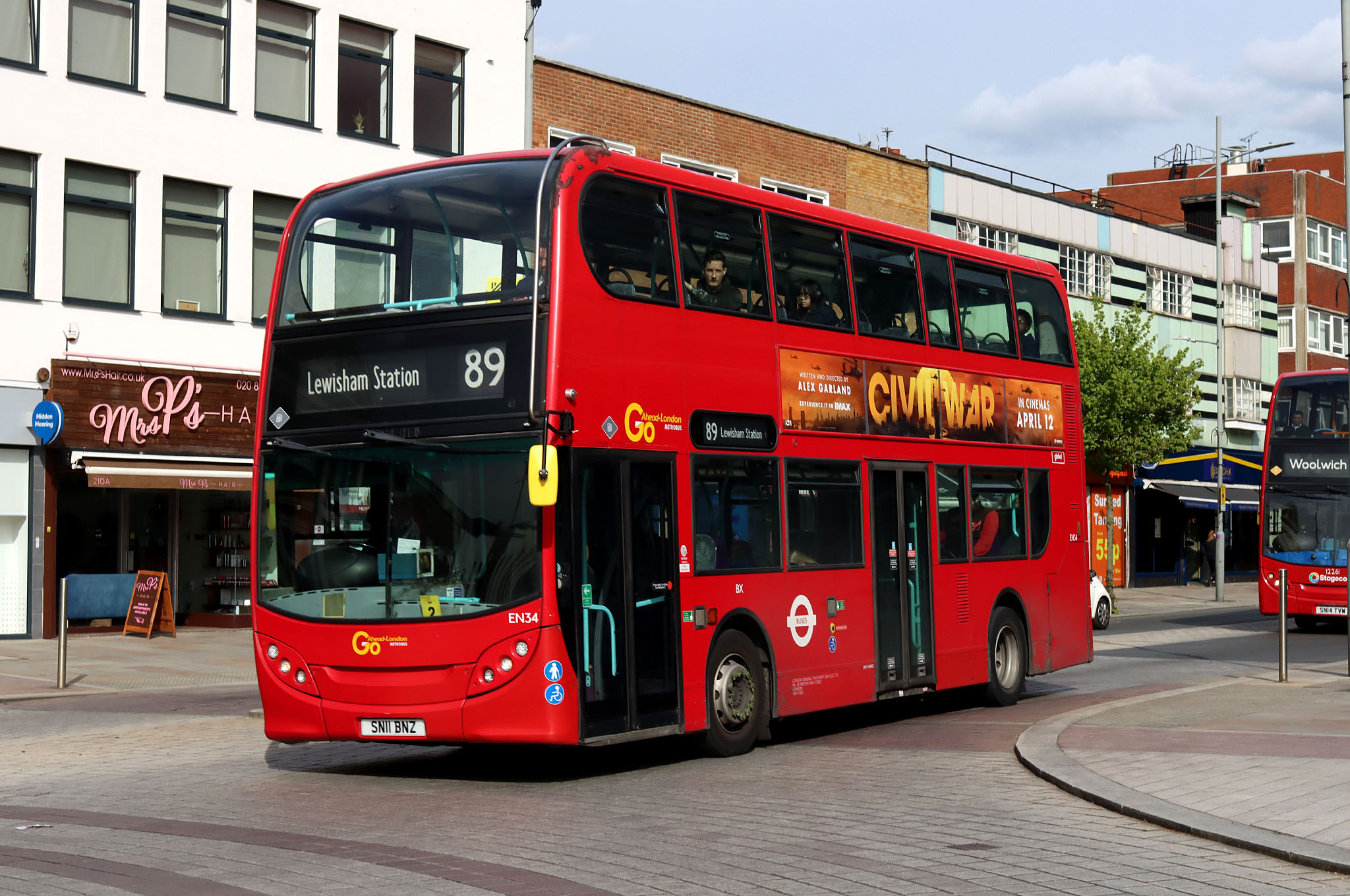
- London Central Alexander Dennis Enviro400 in Bexleyheath in April 2024

Overview
- Operator: London Central (Go-Ahead London)
- Garage: Bexleyheath
- Peak vehicle requirement: 15
- Night-time: N89

Route
- Start: Lewisham station
- Via: Blackheath; Shooter's Hill; Welling; Bexleyheath; Barnehurst
- End: Slade Green station
- Length: 11 miles (18 km)

Service
- Level: Daily
- Frequency: Every 10-20 minutes
- Journey time: 45-67 minutes
- Operates: 05:00 until 00:30

London Buses route 89 is a Transport for London contracted bus route in London, England. Running between Lewisham and Slade Green stations, it is operated by Go-Ahead London subsidiary London Central.

== History ==
In 2010, the frequency of the night service was increased from every half hour to every 20 minutes.

Upon being re-tendered in 2011, route 89 was retained by London Central.

Passenger numbers on route 89 fell from 3.94 million in 2012-13 to 3.62 million in 2016-17. In November 2017 the frequency of the service was cut from every 10 minutes to every 12 minutes and the night service N89 was cut from every 20 minutes to every half hour.

== Current route ==
Route 89 operates via these primary locations:

- Lewisham station
- Blackheath station
- Charlton
- Shooter's Hill
- Welling station
- Crook Log
- Bexleyheath town centre
- Barnehurst station
- Northumberland Heath
- Slade Green station
