= Crayford railway station =

National Rail station in London, England

Crayford
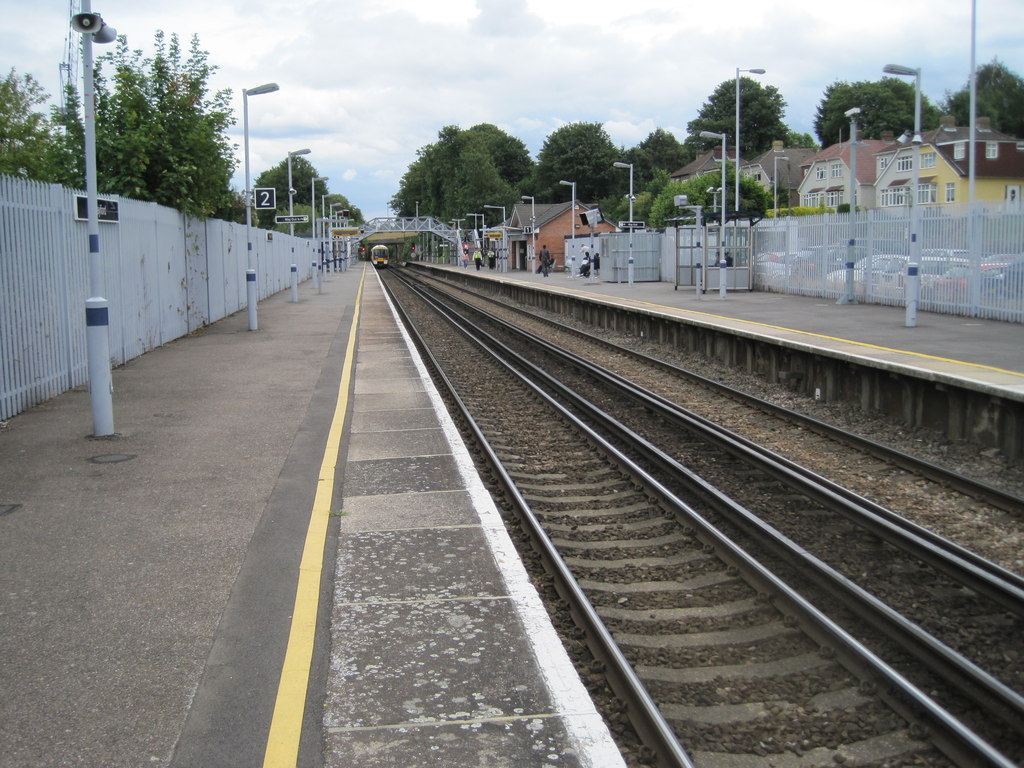
- Interactive map of Crayford

General information
- Location: Crayford
- Local authority: London Borough of Bexley
- Managed by: Southeastern
- Station code: CRY
- DfT category: D
- Number of platforms: 2
- Fare zone: 6

National Rail annual entry and exit
- 2020–21: ▼0.367 million
- 2021–22: ▲0.817 million
- 2022–23: ▲0.965 million
- 2023–24: ▲1.013 million
- 2024–25: ▲1.087 million

Key dates
- 1 September 1866: Opened

Other information
- External links: Departures; Facilities
- Coordinates: 51.4483°N 0.1786°E

Crayford railway station is in the London Borough of Bexley in south-east London, in London fare zone 6. It is 15 miles 25 chains (24.6 km) down the line from London Charing Cross. The station and all trains serving it are operated by Southeastern.

Down trains run eastbound to Dartford and Gravesend, and up trains run westbound to London Charing Cross via Lewisham. Ticket barriers are in operation.

== History ==
Crayford station was opened in September 1866. The original station building, like most of the Dartford Loop Line stations, was built cheaply of clapboard. The station had a brick-built goods shed on the up side. The goods yard had only two tracks with no direct connection to the adjacent waterworks, brickworks and gravel pit. Two additional sidings were eventually constructed on the down side. For many years there was no connection between the two platforms except for a track crossing. A footbridge was provided at the eastern ends of the platforms in 1926 when the line was electrified. A SER-designed signal box at the western end of the down platform was built around 1892.

In 1955, both platforms were lengthened to accommodate ten-carriage trains. The goods yard closed in May 1963. In 1968 the station buildings were completely rebuilt using pre-fabricated CLASP structures. The signal box closed in November 1970.

The footbridge remains the oldest part of the station. The two sidings on the down side remained for many years and were still in use until the mid-1990s. By 2000 the sidings had fallen out of use and were subsequently disconnected, but the sleepers and rails remain in position.

In 2000 the ticket office caught fire and was damaged beyond economical repair. In the following year a new building appeared in its place, together with palisade fencing alongside the rear of both platforms.

On 17 February 1959, an electric multiple unit was in a rear-end collision with another on the nearby Crayford Spur due to a signalman's error. Seventy people were injured.

== Location ==
The station is situated in Lower Station Road, close to Crayford town centre.

== Services ==
All services at Crayford are operated by Southeastern using Class 376, 465, 466 and 707 EMUs.

The typical off-peak service in trains per hour is:

- 4 tph to London Charing Cross (2 of these run direct and 2 run via Lewisham)
- 4 tph to Dartford of which 2 continue to Gravesend

Additional services, including trains to and from London Cannon Street either via Lewisham or via Woolwich Arsenal and Greenwich, and to London Blackfriars, call at the station during peak hours.

Preceding station	National Rail	Following station
Bexley	Southeastern Dartford Loop Line	Dartford
Bexley	Southeastern North Kent Line Peak Hours Only	Slade Green

== Connections ==
Crayford station is served by London Buses route 492 to Bluewater via Dartford and to Sidcup via Bexleyheath.
