= Ashtead railway station =

Railway station in Surrey, England

Coordinates: 51.318°N 0.308°W

Ashtead
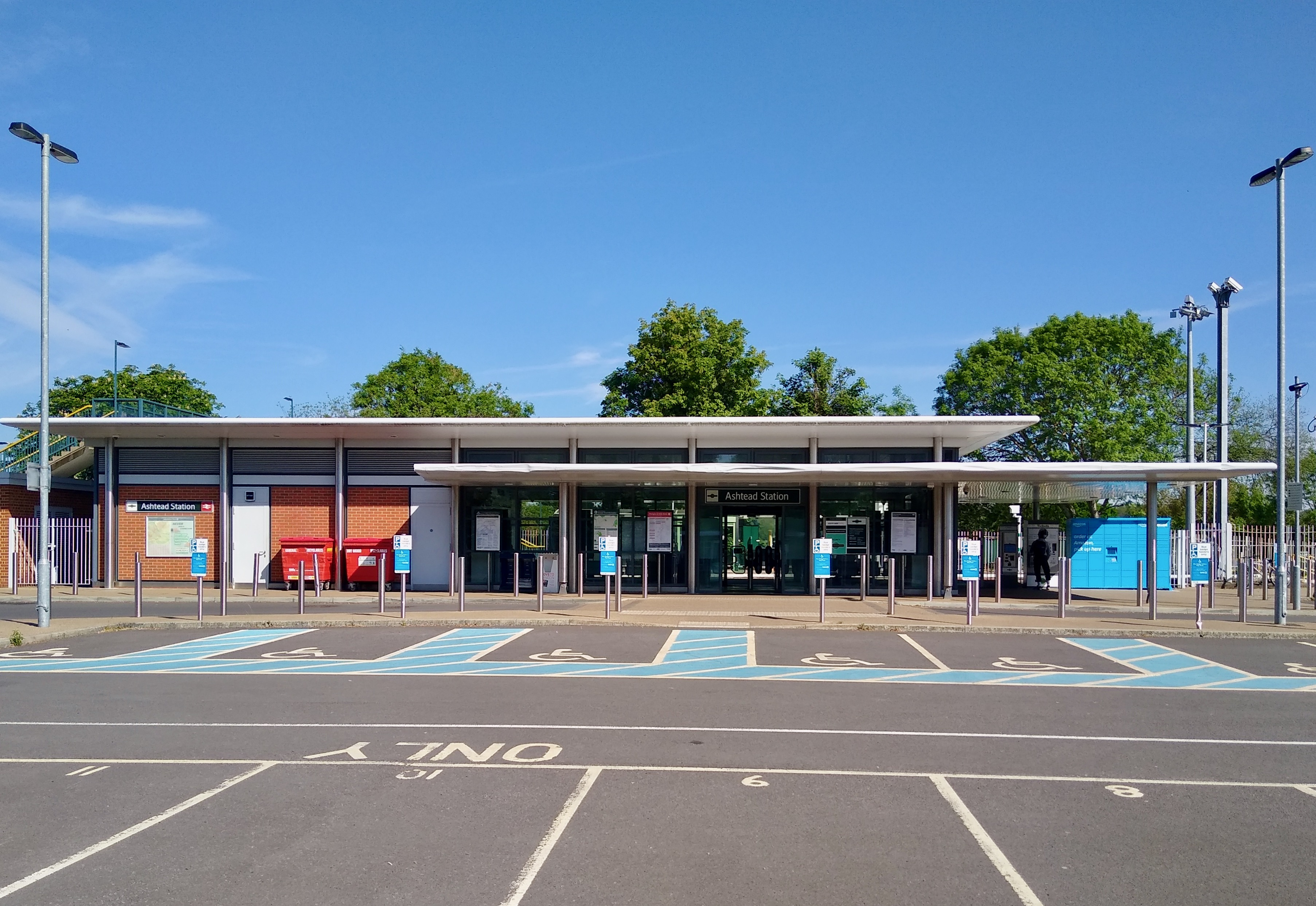
- Ashtead railway station

General information
- Location: Ashtead, District of Mole Valley; England
- Grid reference: TQ180589
- Manager: Southern
- Platforms: 2

Other information
- Station code: AHD
- Classification: DfT category E

History
- Opened: 1 February 1859

Passengers
- 2020/21: ▼0.261 million
- 2021/22: ▲0.697 million
- 2022/23: ▲0.847 million
- 2023/24: ▲0.934 million
- 2024/25: ▲1.024 million
Location
Notes
- Passenger statistics from the Office of Rail and Road

Ashtead railway station is in Ashtead, Surrey, England. It is 16 miles 19 chains (26.1 km) down the line from London Waterloo.

== History ==
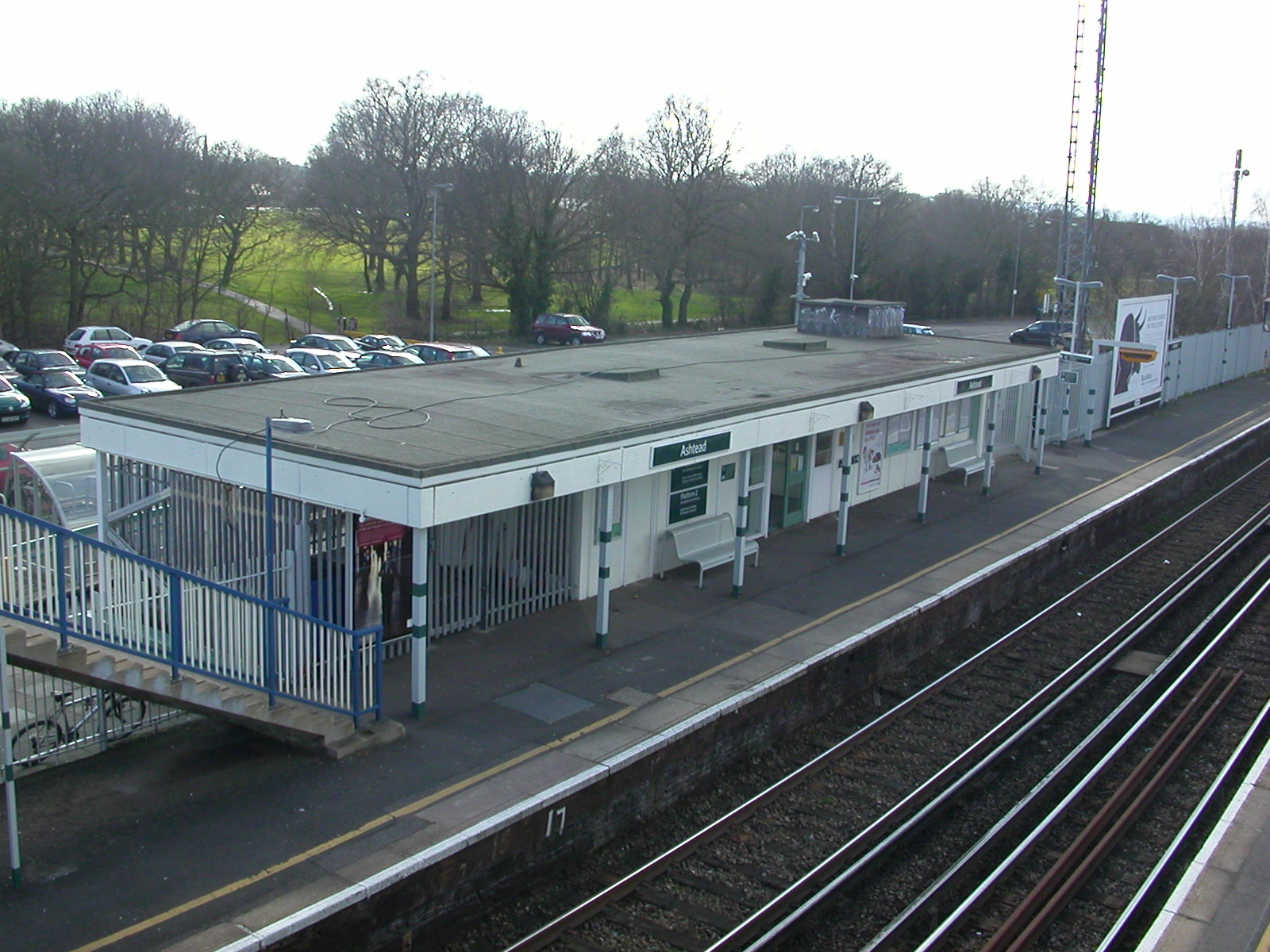
The former station building, seen in 2007

Designed by David Field in 1858 and opened by the Epsom and Leatherhead Railway, part of the London and South Western Railway, it became a joint station between that railway and the London, Brighton and South Coast Railway and was absorbed into the Southern Railway by the grouping of 1923. The station passed to the Southern Region of British Railways on nationalisation in 1948.

When sectorisation was introduced in the 1980s, the station was served by Network SouthEast until the privatisation of British Rail.

In the 1970s, the station was redesigned by Nigel Wikeley in the typical CLASP manner, with a long and low design constructed from prefabricated materials. The main ticket office building was rebuilt in 2013. As part of the National Station Improvements Programme (NSIP) new station buildings have been designed by engineers Sinclair Knight Merz and BPR Architects.

== Services ==
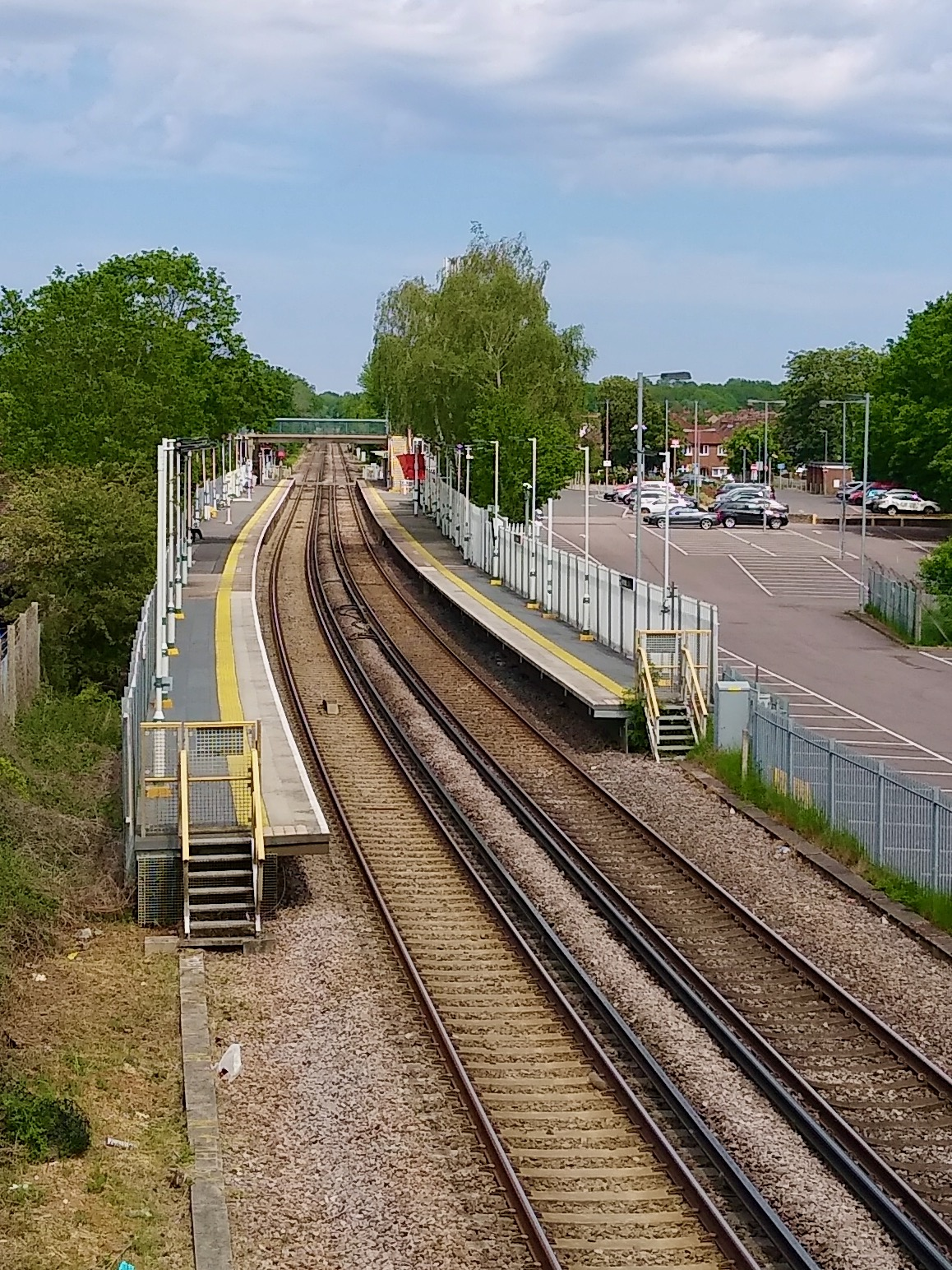
The station seen in June 2021

Services at Ashtead are operated by Southern and South Western Railway using Class 377, Class 455 and Class 701 Arterio EMUs.

The typical off-peak service in trains per hour is:

- 2 tph to London Victoria via Sutton
- 2 tph to London Waterloo via Wimbledon
- 3 tph to Dorking of which 1 continues to Horsham
- 1 tph to Guildford

On Saturday evenings (after approximately 18:45) and on Sundays, there is no service south of Dorking to Horsham.

Preceding station	National Rail	Following station
Epsom	Southern Sutton & Mole Valley Lines	Leatherhead
Epsom	South Western Railway Mole Valley Line	Leatherhead

== Bibliography ==
- Butt, R. V. J. (October 1995). The Directory of Railway Stations: details every public and private passenger station, halt, platform and stopping place, past and present (1st ed.). Sparkford: Patrick Stephens Ltd. ISBN 978-1-85260-508-7. OCLC 60251199. OL 11956311M.
- Jowett, Alan (2000). Jowett's Nationalised Railway Atlas (1st ed.). Penryn, Cornwall: Atlantic Transport Publishers. ISBN 978-0-906899-99-1. OCLC 228266687.
