= Belvedere railway station =

National Rail station in London, England

Belvedere
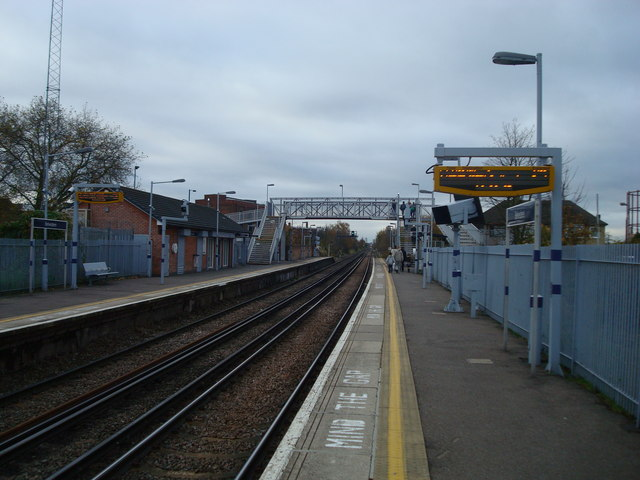
- Interactive map of Belvedere

General information
- Location: Belvedere
- Local authority: London Borough of Bexley
- Managed by: Southeastern
- Station code: BVD
- DfT category: E
- Number of platforms: 2
- Accessible: Yes
- Fare zone: 5

National Rail annual entry and exit
- 2020–21: ▼0.405 million
- 2021–22: ▲0.763 million
- 2022–23: ▲0.799 million
- 2023–24: ▼0.744 million
- 2024–25: ▼0.696 million

Key dates
- March 1859: Opened

Other information
- External links: Departures; Facilities
- Coordinates: 51.4927°N 0.1524°E

Belvedere railway station is a railway station in South East London between Abbey Wood and Erith. It is 12 miles 75 chains (20.8 km) measured from London Charing Cross. It is served by Southeastern.

A level crossing beyond the western end of the platforms was closed before the westerly extension of the platforms around 1994, and the ticket office and platform shelters were rebuilt soon afterwards.

== Services ==
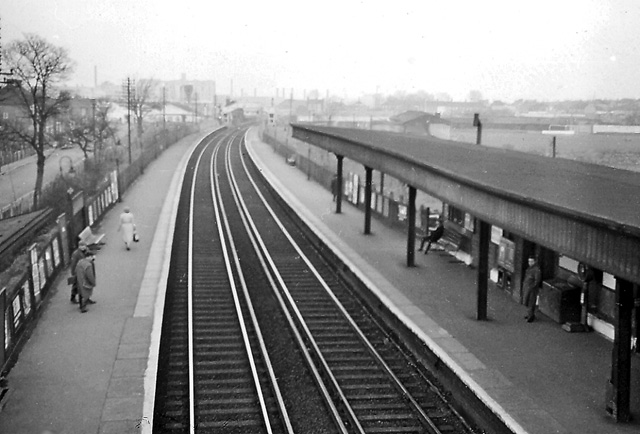
Belvedere Station in 1961

All services at Belvedere are operated by Southeastern using Class 376, 465, 466 and 707 EMUs.

The typical off-peak service in trains per hour is:

- 4 tph to London Cannon Street (2 of these run via Greenwich and 2 run via Lewisham)
- 2 tph to Barnehurst, returning to London Cannon Street via Bexleyheath and Lewisham
- 2 tph to Dartford

Additional services, including trains to and from London Cannon Street via Sidcup call at the station during the peak hours.

Preceding station	National Rail	Following station
Abbey Wood	Southeastern North Kent Line	Erith

== Connections ==
London Buses routes 180, 229, 401 and 469 serve the station.

The London Borough of Bexley advocates for the extension of the Docklands Light Railway (DLR) to Belvedere alongside Transport for London's existing plans to extend the DLR from Beckton Riverside to Thamesmead, with the Council formally advocating the Belvedere extension as part of its response to the TFL consultation on the issue. As of December 2025, there is no update on any plans to extent to Belvedere, although the government has confirmed support of TFL's plans regarding the Thamesmead extension.
