= Blairhill railway station =

Railway station in North Lanarkshire, Scotland

Blairhill
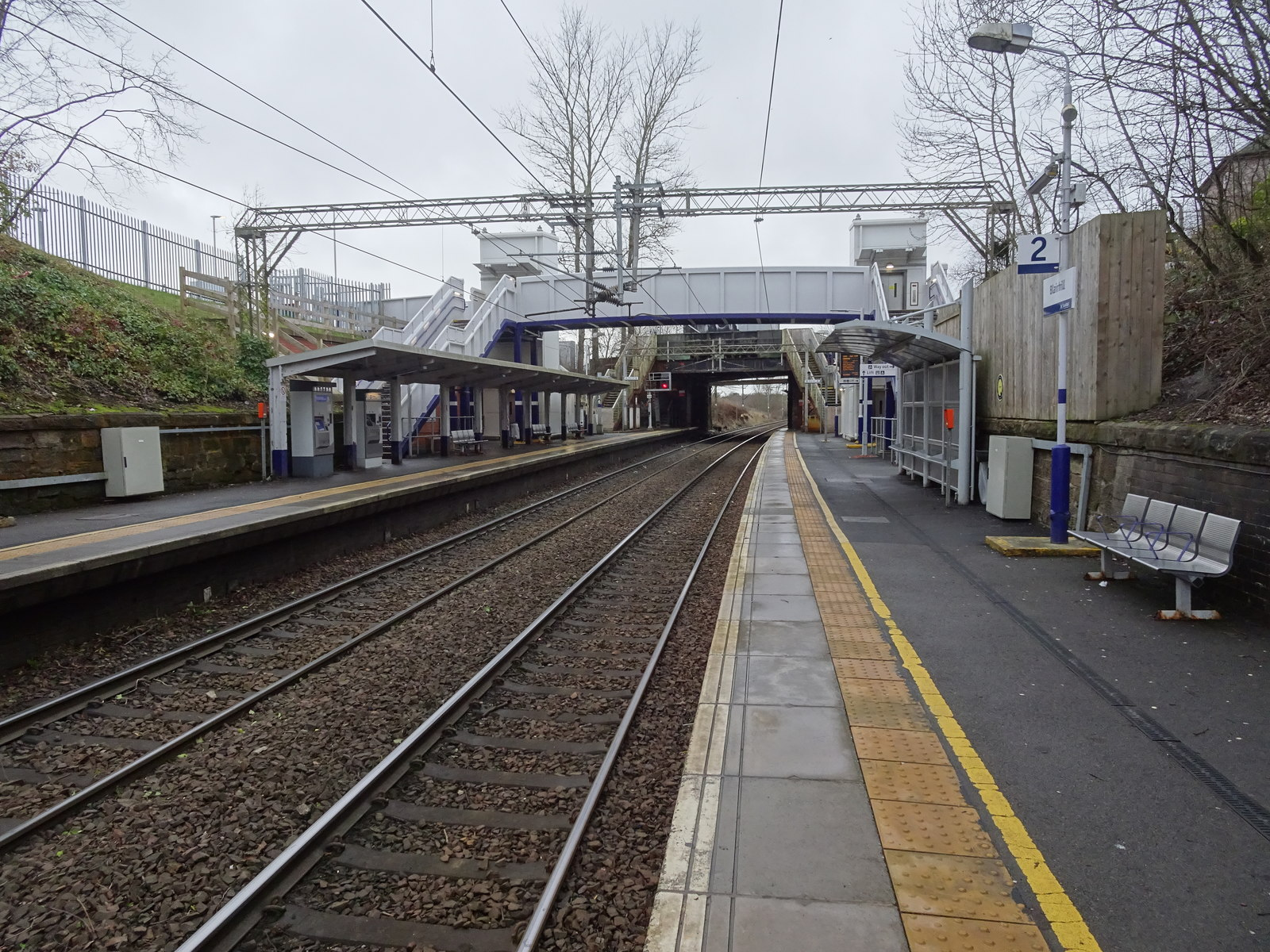
- Blairhill railway station in 2019

General information
- Location: Coatbridge, North Lanarkshire; Scotland
- Coordinates: 55.8665°N 4.0427°W
- Grid reference: NS722655
- Managed by: ScotRail
- Platforms: 2

Other information
- Station code: BAI

History
- Original company: North British Railway
- Post-grouping: LNER

Key dates
- 1 February 1871: Opened as Blairhill and Gartsherrie
- 1960s???: Renamed as Blairhill

Passengers
- 2020/21: ▼54,710
- 2021/22: ▲0.203 million
- 2022/23: ▲0.290 million
- 2023/24: ▲0.343 million
- 2024/25: ▲0.378 million
Location
Notes
- Passenger statistics from the Office of Rail and Road

Blairhill railway station serves the Blairhill area of the town of Coatbridge in North Lanarkshire, Scotland. It is 8½ miles (13 km) east of Glasgow Queen Street railway station. Situated on Blair Road, the railway station is managed by ScotRail and is served by trains on the North Clyde Line, comprising Class 334s on Edinburgh to Helensburgh services, and Class 318s and Class 320s on Airdrie to Balloch services.

== History ==
The station was built opened on 1 February 1871 and was previously called Blairhill and Gartsherrie. It bordered the original St. Ambrose High School from 1961 until the buildings were demolished in 2012.

== Facilities ==
The street-level platform, which now bears the "portacabin" ticket office, once supported a wooden station building which housed a ticket office and newsagent. On the night of 12 January 1987, shortly after being painted in the bright orange livery of the Strathclyde Passenger Transport Executive, this building was burned to the ground. The station now has a staffed ticket office during working hours (Monday-Saturday). A new purpose built car park on the site of the former St. Ambrose High School now serves the station.

== Services ==
Monday to Saturday daytimes:

- Half-hourly service towards Edinburgh Waverley
- Half-hourly service towards Airdrie
- Half-hourly service towards Balloch via Glasgow Queen Street Low Level
- Half-hourly service towards Helensburgh Central via Glasgow Queen Street Low Level (As of August 2016 this service no longer calls at Shettleston, Cartyne and Bellgrove. Passengers for these stations please use the half-hourly service towards Balloch instead.)

Evening services are as follows:

- Half-hourly service towards Airdrie via all stations
- Half-hourly service towards Balloch via Glasgow Queen Street Low Level

Sunday services are as follows:

- Half-hourly service towards Edinburgh Waverley
- Half-hourly service towards Helensburgh Central

Preceding station	National Rail	Following station
Coatbridge Sunnyside	ScotRail; North Clyde Line	Easterhouse
	Historical railways	
Coatbridge Sunnyside	North British Railway; Coatbridge Branch	Bargeddie

== Gallery ==
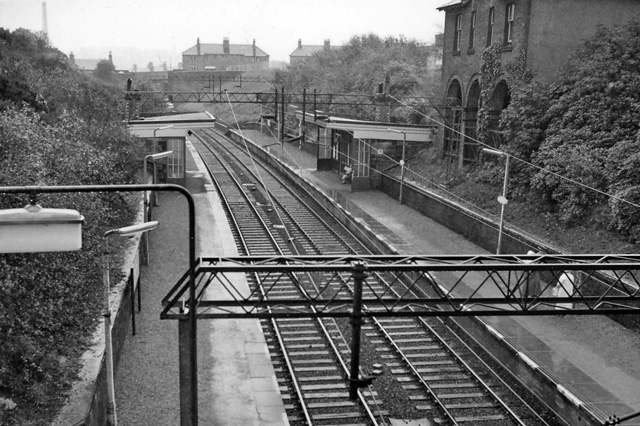
Blairhill & Gartsherrie Station in 1961

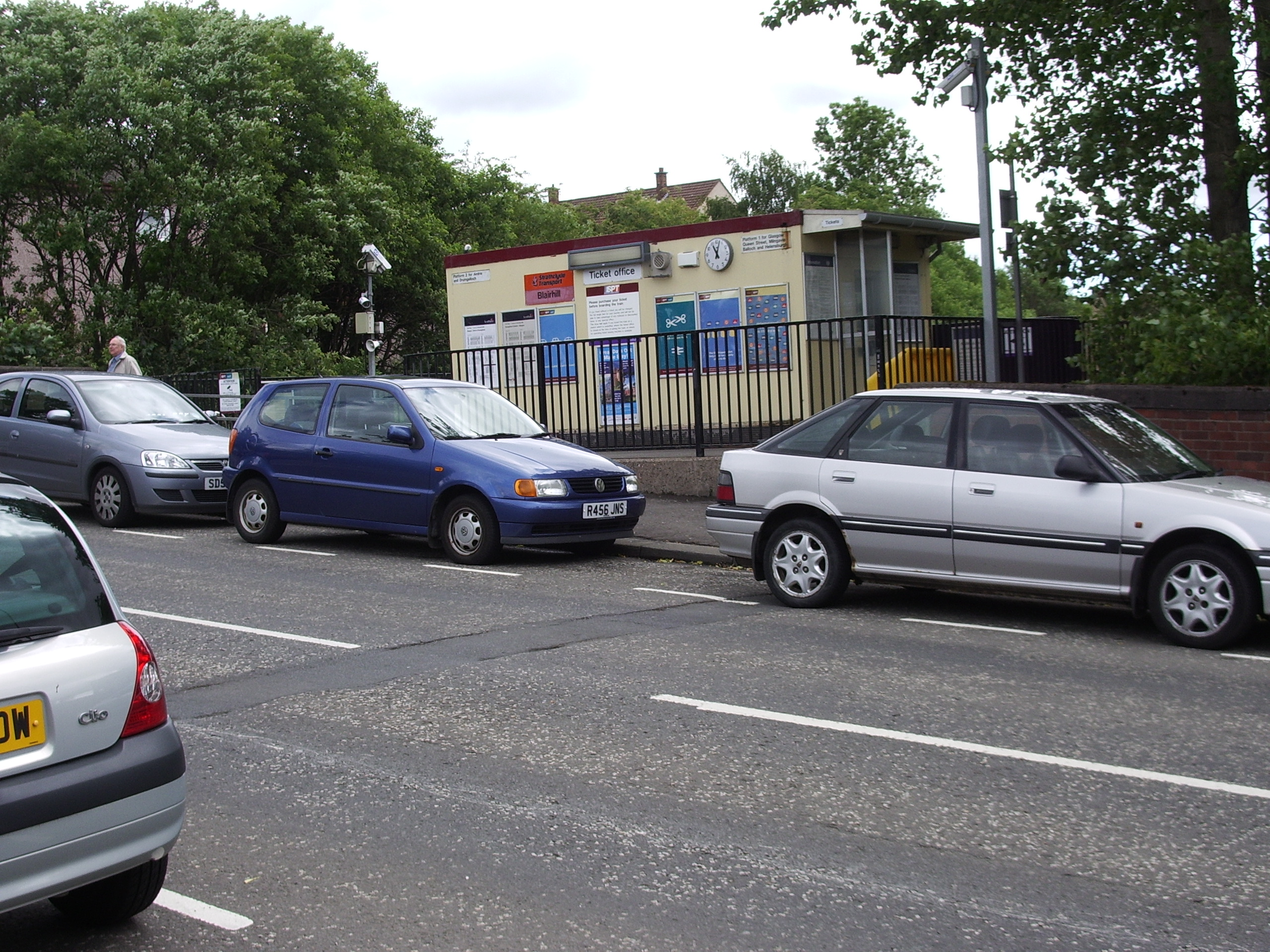
Blairhill railway station ticket office
