= Our Lady of the Angels Church, Erith =

Our Lady of the Angels Church
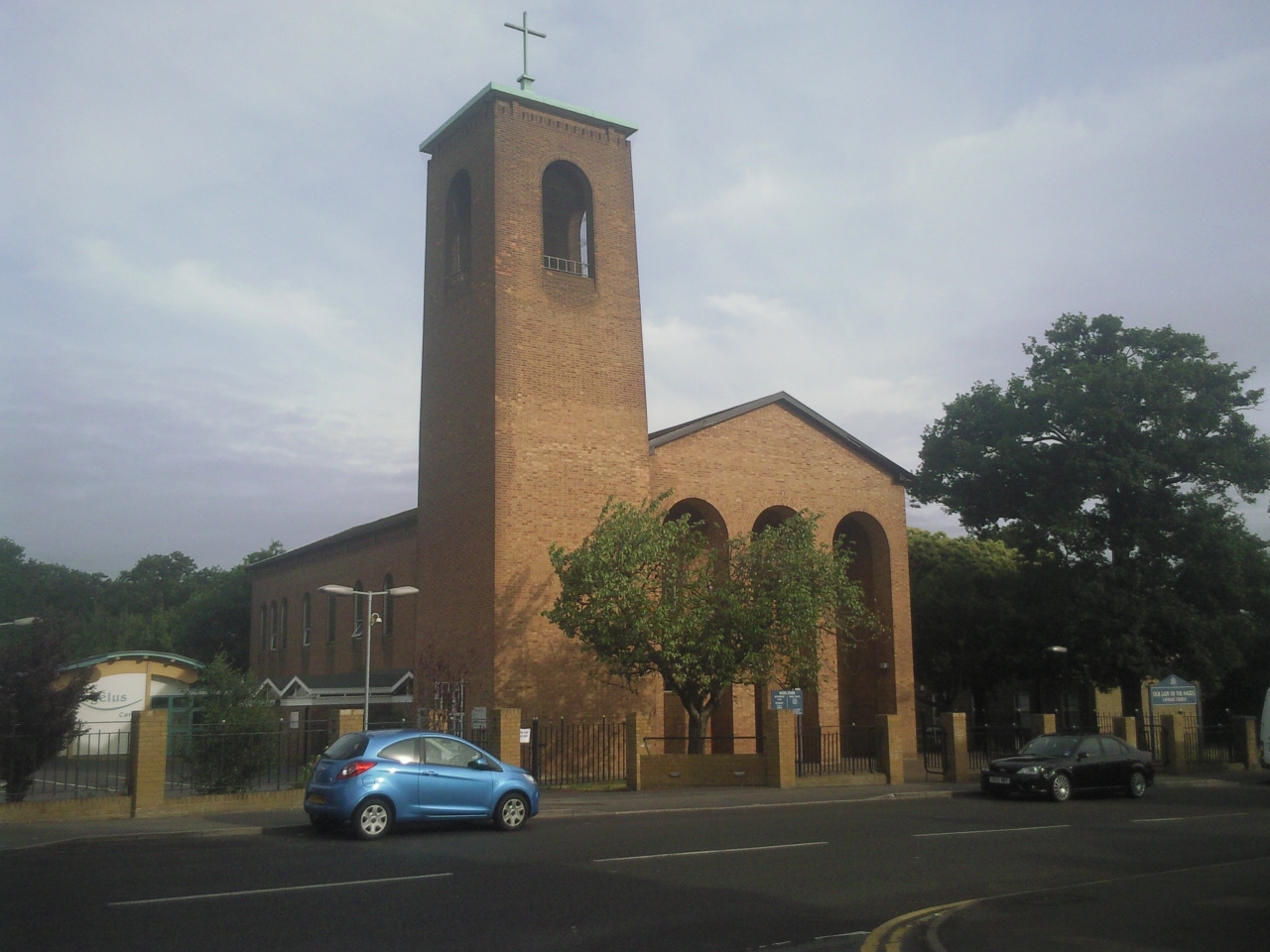
- Our Lady of the Angels Church
- 51.4773°N 0.1629°E
- OS grid reference: TQ 50298 77589
- Location: Erith
- Country: England
- Denomination: Roman Catholic
- Religious institute: Capuchins
- Website: OLAErith.org.uk

History
- Status: Active
- Founded: 1867
- Dedication: Saint Mary

Architecture
- Architect(s): Archard & Partners
- Style: Modern
- Groundbreaking: 9 September 1962
- Completed: December 1963
- Construction cost: £45,750

Administration
- Archdiocese: Southwark
- Deanery: Bexley

Our Lady of the Angels Church is a Roman Catholic parish church in Erith, London. It was built in 1963 by the Capuchins who have been in the area since 1867. It is located on the corner of Bexley Road and Carlton Road. It is the only Catholic Church in London served by Capuchin priests and Historic England said that its "classical styling of the tall entrance arches and the landmark campanile are powerful features in the street scene."

== History ==
=== Foundation ===
In 1867, a Capuchin priest, Fr Maurice started a mission in Erith for the local Catholic community. He lived in a house in Cross Street, where he said Mass. Later a site was bought on West Street, where St Fidelis' Church, a school and presbytery was built. In 1875, a friary for the Capuchins was established, and new buildings constructed around the church. Later, the current site of the church was bought. In October 1902, building work started on new friary for the Capuchins there. In 1903, the new friary was opened. In the 1920s a hall was built on the site which was used as the church. In 1947, part of the friary was turned into a chapel.

=== Construction ===
In 1960, St Fidelis' Primary School was opened. In 1962, construction work started on Our Lady of the Angels Church next to the school. On 9 September 1962, the foundation stone was laid by the Bishop of Southwark Cyril Cowderoy. The church was designed by the architectural firm Archard & Partners and construction work was done by H. Friday & Sons, of Erith. In December 1963, the church opened. It cost £45,750. In 1989, the original St Fidelis' Church was demolished. Before its demolition, two stained glass windows were taken from St Fidelis' Church and were transferred to Our Lady of the Angels Church. After 2000, the parish hall built in the 1920s was replaced by the Angelus Centre.

== Parish ==
The church has four Sunday Masses at 5:30pm on Saturday, 8:30am, 10:30am and 6:00pm on Sunday, with a 12:30pm Mass in Polish every second Sunday of the month. There are Masses at 9:00am from Monday to Friday and a 10:30am on Saturday.

== See also ==
- Archdiocese of Southwark
