= Slade Green railway station =

National Rail station in London, England

Slade Green
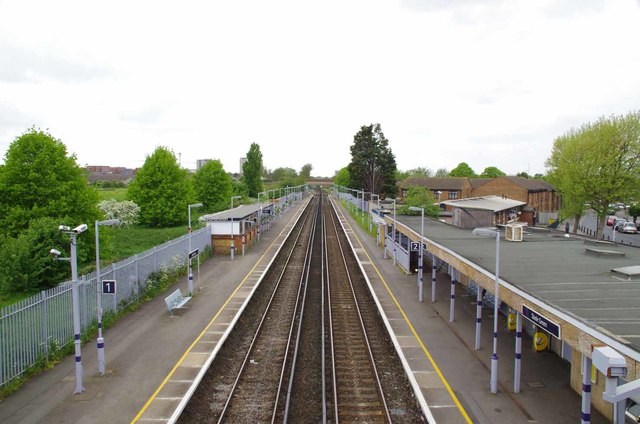
- Interactive map of Slade Green

General information
- Location: Slade Green
- Local authority: London Borough of Bexley
- Managed by: Southeastern
- Station code: SGR
- DfT category: E
- Number of platforms: 2
- Accessible: Yes
- Fare zone: 6

National Rail annual entry and exit
- 2020–21: ▼0.371 million
- Interchange: ▼22,930
- 2021–22: ▲0.676 million
- Interchange: ▲42,625
- 2022–23: ▲0.917 million
- Interchange: ▲47,496
- 2023–24: ▲1.091 million
- Interchange: ▼42,822
- 2024–25: ▲1.104 million
- Interchange: ▲43,117

Key dates
- 1 July 1900: Opened as Slades Green
- 21 September 1953: Renamed Slade Green

Other information
- External links: Departures; Facilities
- Coordinates: 51.4678°N 0.1904°E

Slade Green railway station is in the London Borough of Bexley, southeast London, on the North Kent Line. It is 15 miles 30 chains (24.7 km) measured from London Charing Cross.

The station was built in 1900 to serve the developing community. It opened as "Slades Green" and it was not until 1953 that this was changed to Slade Green. There was a level crossing across the tracks at the south end of the station but this and the signal box closed in November 1970 when the line was resignalled. As of 2019 the station and trains serving it are operated by Southeastern and Thameslink.

== Services ==
Services at Slade Green are operated by Southeastern and Thameslink using Class 376, 465, 466, 700 and 707 EMUs.

The typical off-peak service in trains per hour is:

- 4 tph to London Cannon Street (2 of these run via Greenwich and 2 run via Lewisham)
- 2 tph to Luton via Greenwich
- 2 tph to Barnehurst, returning to London Cannon Street via Bexleyheath and Lewisham
- 2 tph to Dartford
- 2 tph to Rainham via Chatham

Additional services, including trains to and from London Cannon Street via Sidcup call at the station during the peak hours.

Preceding station	National Rail	Following station
Abbey Wood	Thameslink North Kent Line	Dartford
Erith	Southeastern North Kent Line	Dartford
Erith	Southeastern Bexleyheath Line	Barnehurst
Erith	Southeastern Dartford Loop Line Peak Hours Only	Crayford

== Connections ==
London Buses routes 89, 99, 428 and night route N89 serve the station.

== Future development ==
Studies by Crossrail Ltd. identified Gravesend as the preferred termination point. However, the same studies found Slade Green station to be the outermost station with sufficient capacity to support Crossrail. Rail Freight studies seeking to extend traffic in the opposite direction, with a planned multi modal distribution centre between Slade Green and Dartford, meant that extending Crossrail beyond Slade Green would require additional tracks and possibly a viaduct. From 2009, the commuter route through Slade Green has been safeguarded for future Crossrail extensions.
