= Barnehurst railway station =

National Rail station in London, England

Barnehurst
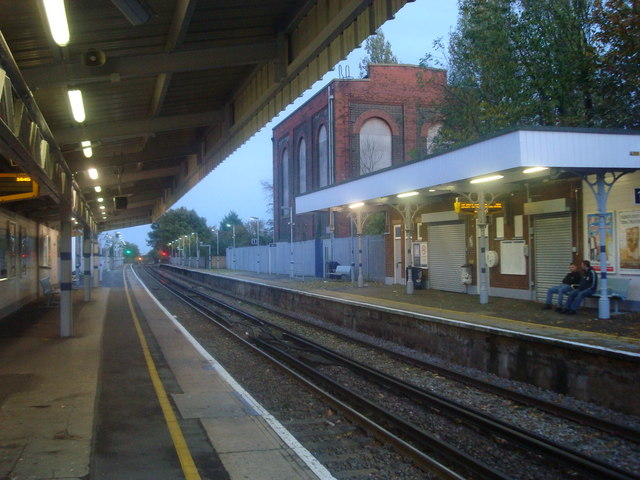
- Interactive map of Barnehurst

General information
- Location: Barnehurst
- Local authority: London Borough of Bexley
- Managed by: Southeastern
- Station code: BNH
- DfT category: C2
- Number of platforms: 2
- Accessible: Yes
- Fare zone: 6

National Rail annual entry and exit
- 2020–21: ▼0.376 million
- 2021–22: ▲0.807 million
- 2022–23: ▲0.841 million
- 2023–24: ▲0.888 million
- 2024–25: ▲0.956 million

Key dates
- 1 May 1895: Opened

Other information
- External links: Departures; Facilities
- Coordinates: 51.4648°N 0.1595°E

Barnehurst railway station serves Barnehurst, Northumberland Heath and northern parts of Bexleyheath in the London Borough of Bexley; it is 13 miles 71 chains (22.3 km) from Charing Cross on the Bexleyheath line. The platforms are situated east of the Barnehurst Lane overbridge.

Barnehurst was opened by the Bexley Heath Railway on 1 May 1895 as part of its route from Blackheath to Slade Green.

== Services ==
All services at Barnehurst are operated by Southeastern using Class 376, 465, 466 and 707 EMUs.

The typical off-peak service in trains per hour is:

- 2 tph to London Victoria
- 1 tph to London Charing Cross
- 2 tph to London Cannon Street
- 2 tph to Slade Green, continuing to London Cannon Street via Woolwich Arsenal and Greenwich
- 3 tph to Dartford

During the peak hours, the service between London Charing Cross and Dartford is increased to 2 tph in each direction.

Preceding station	National Rail	Following station
Bexleyheath	Southeastern Bexleyheath Line	Dartford
Bexleyheath	Southeastern North Kent Line	Slade Green

== Connections ==
London Buses routes 89, 99, 229, school routes 602, 669 and night route N89 serve the station.
