= Bexleyheath railway station =

National Rail station in London, England

Bexleyheath
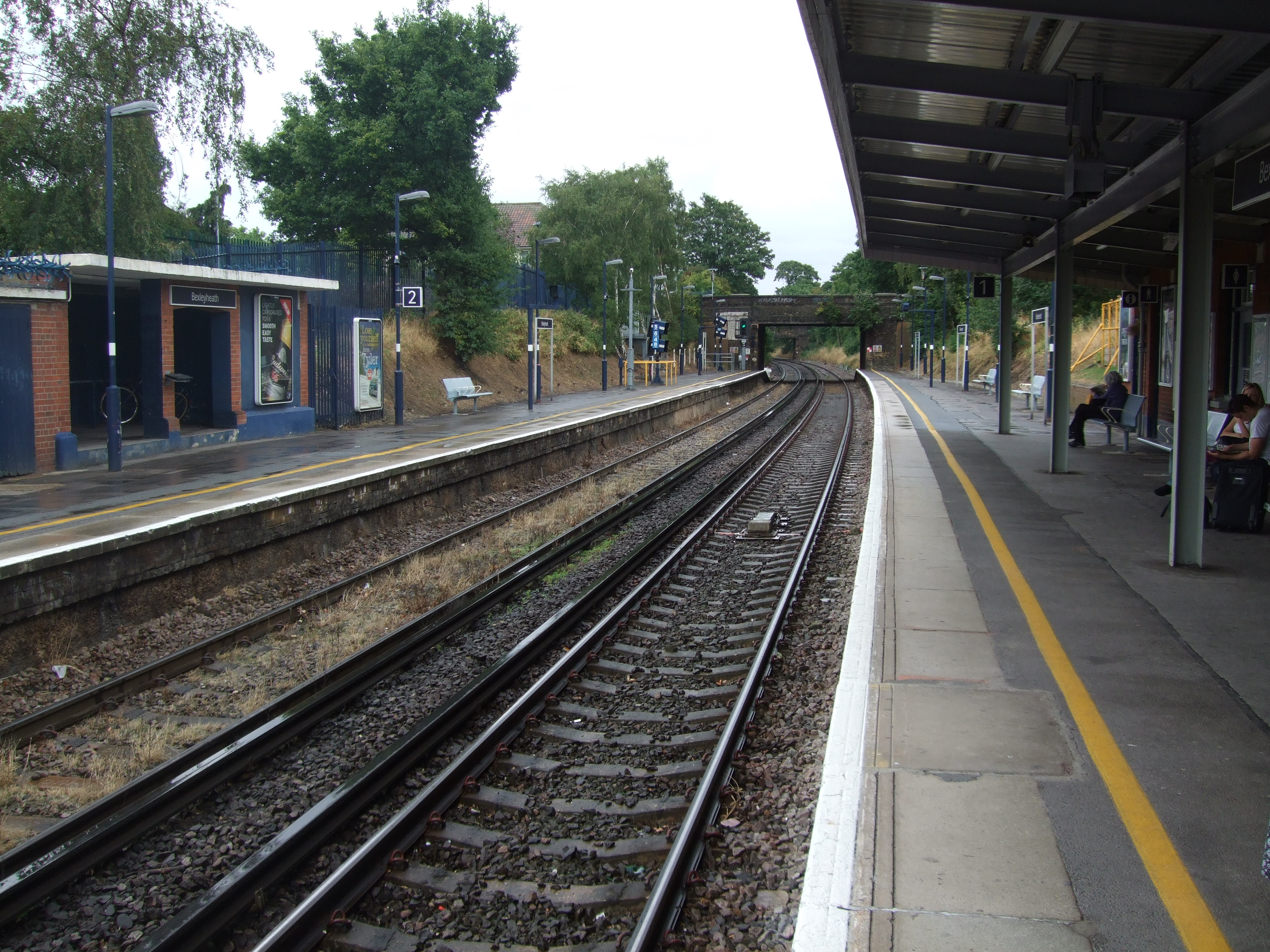
- Interactive map of Bexleyheath

General information
- Location: Bexleyheath
- Local authority: London Borough of Bexley
- Managed by: Southeastern
- Station code: BXH
- DfT category: C2
- Number of platforms: 2
- Accessible: Yes
- Fare zone: 5

National Rail annual entry and exit
- 2020–21: ▼0.621 million
- 2021–22: ▲1.447 million
- 2022–23: ▼1.423 million
- 2023–24: ▲1.464 million
- 2024–25: ▲1.475 million

Key dates
- 1 May 1895: Opened

Other information
- External links: Departures; Facilities
- Coordinates: 51.4635°N 0.1338°E

Bexleyheath railway station is in the London Borough of Bexley in southeast London, and is in London fare zone 5. The station, and all trains serving it, are operated by Southeastern. There are ticket barriers at both entrances.

It is located to the north of Bexleyheath town centre on Avenue Road, and lies 12 miles 59 chains (20.5 km) from London Charing Cross.

== Services ==
All services at Bexleyheath are operated by Southeastern using Class 376, 465, 466 and 707 EMUs.

The typical off-peak service in trains per hour is:

- 2 tph to London Victoria
- 1 tph to London Charing Cross
- 2 tph to London Cannon Street
- 2 tph to Slade Green, continuing to London Cannon Street via Woolwich Arsenal and Greenwich
- 3 tph to Dartford, of which 2 continue to Gravesend

During the peak hours, the service between London Charing Cross and Dartford is increased to 2 tph in each direction.

Preceding station	National Rail	Following station
Welling	Southeastern Bexleyheath Line	Barnehurst

== Connections ==
London Buses routes 422, B11, B12, B15 and SL3 serve the station.
