= List of people from the London Borough of Bexley =

This is a list of notable people who were born or grew up in the London Borough of Bexley or otherwise have a strong association with the area.

== Politics, government, military ==
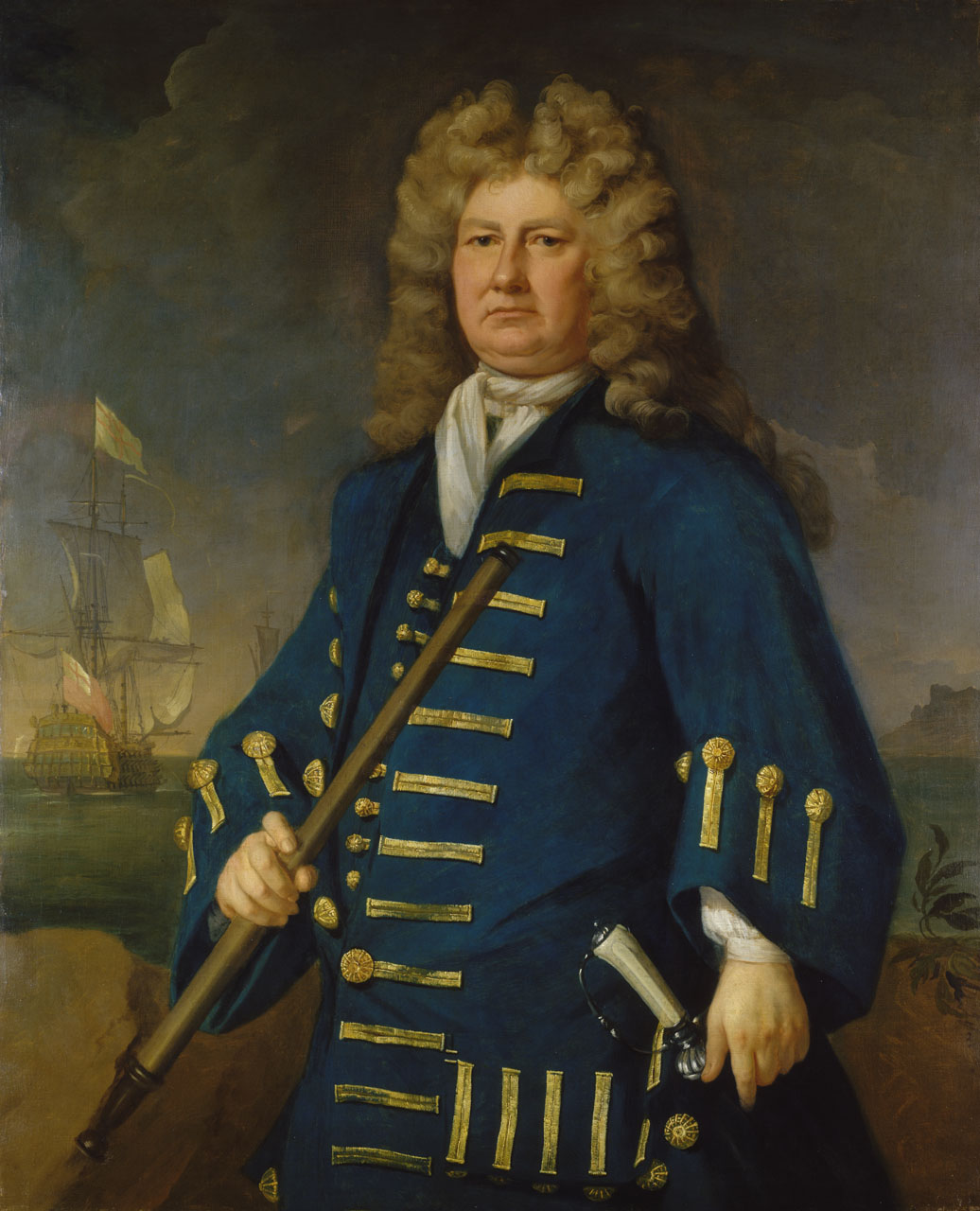
Sir Cloudesley Shovell

- George Albert Cairns (1913–1944), winner of the last Victoria Cross of World War II, lived and worked in Sidcup.
- Sir John Champneys (1495–1556), Lord Mayor of London in 1534, began the building of Hall Place in 1537. He is buried in St. Mary the Virgin Church in Old Bexley.
- William Claiborne (c.1600–c.1677), originally from Crayford, pioneer, early settler in the Americas, and from 1621 the surveyor of Jamestown in the Virginia Colony, later establishing, in 1631, the first permanent European settlement in Maryland, on Kent Island where his own residence was called Fort Crayford.
- Sir Frederick Currie (1799–1875), British diplomat and colonial administrator, lived at the Manor House, May Place.
- Godfrey Huggins (1883–1971), 1st Viscount Malvern, Commonwealth statesman and Prime Minister of Rhodesia and Nyasaland, was born in Bexley.
- Melita Norwood (1912–2005), Cold War Soviet spy, lived undetected in Bexleyheath until her death.
- Harry Ord (1819–1885), colonial administrator who served as governor of Bermuda and Western Australia, born in North Cray.
- Mike Rann (1953–), Premier of South Australia, politician, born in Sidcup, lived in Blackfen prior to emigrating to New Zealand with his parents.
- Admiral Sir Cloudesley Shovell (1650–1707), naval officer, lived at May Place between 1694 and 1707.
- Robert Stewart, Viscount Castlereagh (1769–1822), politician and Foreign Secretary from 1812, lived at Loring Hall, North Cray, until his suicide by knife in 1822. His residency at Loring Hall is marked by an English Heritage blue plaque.
- Thomas Townshend, 1st Viscount Sydney (1733–1800), politician and Cabinet minister, lived in Frognal House, Foots Cray.
- Nicholas Vansittart, 1st Baron Bexley (1766–1851), politician who served as Chancellor of the Exchequer (1812–22). Created Baron Bexley on his resignation as Chancellor, Vansittart lived in Foots Cray Place with his wife from 1821 until his death. As he died without children, he was the only Baron Bexley.
- James Wellbeloved (1926–2012), politician, first leader of newly created Bexley London Borough Council (1956–65), Labour MP for Erith & Crayford (1965–83), lived in Erith.
- Henry Wheatley (1777–1852), keeper of the privy purse for King William IV and Queen Victoria from 1830 to 1846, born and raised in Lesney House, Erith.

== Scientists and inventors ==
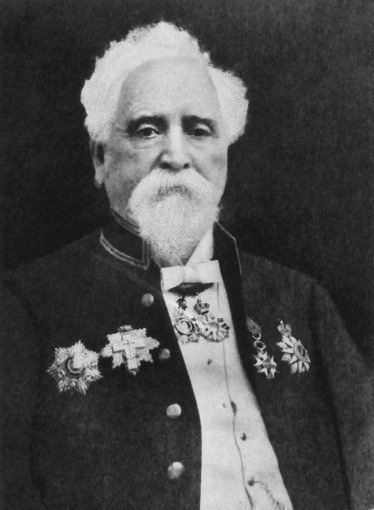
Sir Hiram Maxim

- Patrick Young Alexander (1867–1943), aeronautical pioneer, born in Hern Villa, Belvedere.
- Sir William Anderson (1834–1898), engineer and philanthropist, lived in Erith from 1864 until 1889 and contributed substantial time and money to the local community.
- Augustus Applegath (1788–1871), inventor of the vertical printing-press, also built Shenstone House, lived and worked in Crayford.
- Sheila Callender (1914–2004), haematologist, born in Sidcup.
- Frank Farmer (1912–2004), physicist, pioneer in developing medical applications for physics, born in Bexleyheath.
- Mary Kingsley (1862—1900), ethnographer, scientific writer, and explorer, lived as a young woman with her mother and brother in Southwood or Southwark House, Main Road (Crook Log).
- Frederick George Loring (1869–1951), English naval officer and writer, and an early expert in wireless telegraphy, lived in Loring Hall, North Cray, until his death.
- Ivan Magill (1888–1986), innovative anaesthetist, worked in Sidcup.
- Sir Hiram Maxim (1840–1916), inventor of the Maxim gun, moved his works to Crayford in 1884 and lived in Stoneyhurst from then until 1889.
- Sir John Pender (1816–1896), Scottish communications engineer and pioneer of undersea cabling, later politician, lived at Foots Cray Place from 1876 for the remainder of his life, buried at All Saints' Church.
- Anthony Reckenzaun (1850–93), engineer, worked at the Erith Ironworks and set up evening classes for the workmen.
- Flaxman Charles John Spurrell (1842–1915), archaeologist, geologist and photographer, moved to the borough as a child and later lived at The Priory, Picardy Road, Belvedere. Spurrell Avenue in Bexley is named after him.
- Joshua Trimmer (1795–1857), geologist, born in North Cray.
- Jack Wall (1932–2018), inventor of the Crayford focuser, which is incorporated into many modern telescopes.

== Writers and journalists ==
- William Auld (1924–2006), Scottish poet, author and Esperantist, born in Erith.
- Algernon Blackwood (1869–1951), ghost story writer, journalist and broadcaster, lived in Crayford Manor House between 1871 and 1880 as a child, and the house features in his work 'A Prisoner in Fairyland' as 'Crayfield Manor House'.
- Denis Bond (1946–), children's author, actor and scriptwriter, lives in Sidcup.
- Garry Bushell (1955–), journalist, lives in Sidcup.
- Hall Caine (1853–1931), author, lived in Aberleigh Lodge, Bexleyheath from 1884 to 1889 with his wife Mary and son Gordon Ralph, next door to Red House, home of William Morris. Aberleigh Lodge was demolished in the 1970s.
- Wendy Cope (1945–), poet and author, born in Erith.
- Edward Shepherd Creasy (1812–1878), author of The Fifteen Decisive Battles of the World, born in Bexley.
- Roald Dahl (1916–1990), Welsh-born children's author, lived at Oakwood, Hurst Road, Bexley, from 1927 to 1934, when not at boarding school.
- Thomas Harman, author of a work about vagabonds and rogues in 1566, resided in Crayford from 1547.

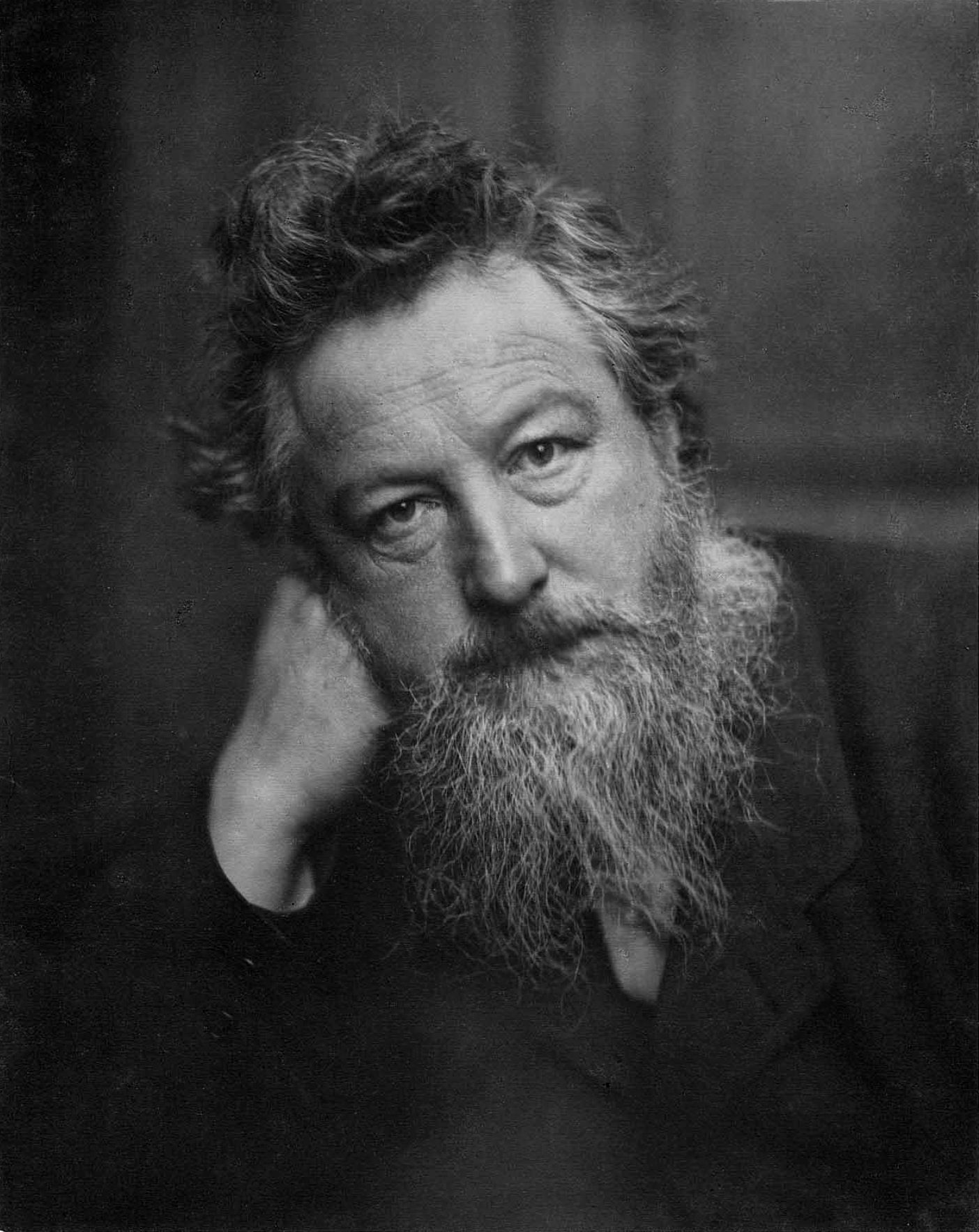
William Morris

- Neal Lawson (1963–), politician and commentator, grew up and went to school in Bexleyheath.
- James Leasor (1923–2007), journalist and author, born in Erith.
- Gerard Shelley (1891–1980), author, translator and Catholic bishop, born in Sidcup.
- Nevil Shute (1899–1960), novelist and aeronautical engineer, lived in Hatherley Road, Sidcup, in the late 1920s, while working at Vickers in Crayford.
- James Stephanie Sterling (1984–), video game journalist, born and grew up in Erith.
- Anne Swithinbank (1957–), horticulturist and gardening writer, born and grew up in Belvedere.
- Elizabeth Wiskemann (1899–1971), historian and journalist, born in Sidcup.

== Entertainment, arts, culture ==
=== Visual arts ===
- Philip Absolon (1960–), Stuckist artist, was born in Erith.
- Quentin Blake (1932–), illustrator, artist, born in Sidcup and attended Chislehurst and Sidcup Grammar School.
- Ian Davenport (1966–), abstract painter and former Turner Prize nominee, born in Sidcup.
- John Downton (1906–1991), artist, poet and philosopher, born in Erith.
- Colin Gill (1892–1940), artist, born in Bexleyheath.
- Ernest Greenwood (1913–2009), artist, teacher and former president of the Royal Watercolour Society, born in Welling.
- Alfred Garth Jones (1872–1955), illustrator, spent the last years of his life in Sidcup.
- Shantell Martin (1980–), visual artist, grew up in Thamesmead, attended Bexleyheath School.
- William Morris (1834–1896), artist, designer, and Socialist, lived for much of his life in Red House, Bexleyheath, built for him as a retreat at a time when Bexleyheath was mostly countryside. The house now bears an English Heritage blue plaque bearing his name, erected in 1969.

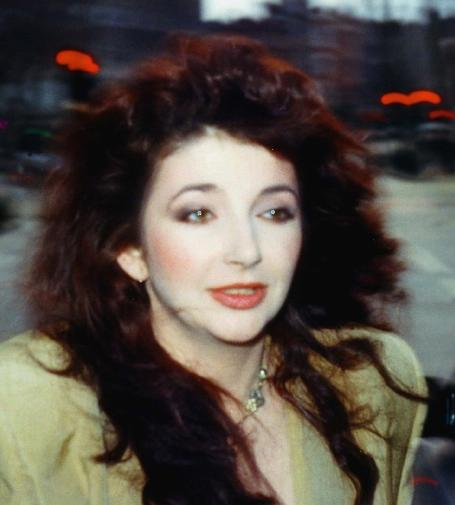
Kate Bush

- Tom Raworth (1938–2017), poet and visual artist, born in Bexleyheath and grew up in Welling.

=== Performing arts ===
- Ronnie Aldrich (1916–1993), jazz pianist and band-leader, was born in Erith.
- F. Matthias Alexander (1869–1955), Australian actor and inventor of the Alexander technique, lived in Penhill House, Sidcup, for 30 years.
- Sam Bailey (1977–), winning contestant, The X-Factor, grew up in Sidcup.
- Doreen Bird (1928–2004), dance teacher, lived in Sidcup and established Bird College.
- Kate Bush (1958–), singer-songwriter, born in Bexley Maternity Hospital, Bexleyheath, grew up at East Wickham farm house, Wickham Street, Welling, attended St. Joseph's Convent Grammar School, Abbey Wood.
- Charlie Clements (1987–), actor (EastEnders), born in Sidcup.
- Michael Crawford (1942–), actor (Some Mothers Do 'Ave 'Em), lived in Bexleyheath from 1945 following his mother's remarriage.
- Michael Gambon (1940–2023), Irish-born actor (the Harry Potter series), lived with his family in Hurstwood Road, North End, and attended Crayford Secondary School.
- Sheila Hancock (1933–), actress, grew up at 58 Latham Road, Bexleyheath.
- Steve Hillier, musician, DJ, record producer.
- John Paul Jones (1946–), bass guitarist (Led Zeppelin), born in Sidcup.
- Jacqueline Jossa (1992–), actress (EastEnders), born in Bexley.
- Rob Knox (1989–2008), actor, murdered in Sidcup.
- Percy Hilder Miles (1878–1922), professor, violinist and composer, born in Crayford and lived most of his life in Erith.
- Roger Moore (1927–2017), actor, lived at St Mary's Mount, Wansunt Road, Bexley, during his marriage to Dorothy Squires.
- Felicity Palmer (1944–), mezzo-soprano opera singer, professor at the Royal College of Music, attended Erith Grammar School (now Erith School).
- Linda Smith (1958–2006), stand-up comic and radio comedienne, was born and raised in Erith and attended Bexleyheath School and Erith College. Smith famously joked that Erith "is not twinned with any town but does have a suicide pact with Dagenham".
- Ethel Smyth (1858–1944), composer and suffragette, born in St. John's Road, Sidcup.
- Dorothy Squires (1915–1998), singer, lived at St Mary's Mount, Wansunt Road, Bexley, until it was destroyed by a fire in 1974.

== Sport ==
=== Football ===
- Semi Ajayi (1992–), Nigerian under-20 international footballer, born in Crayford.

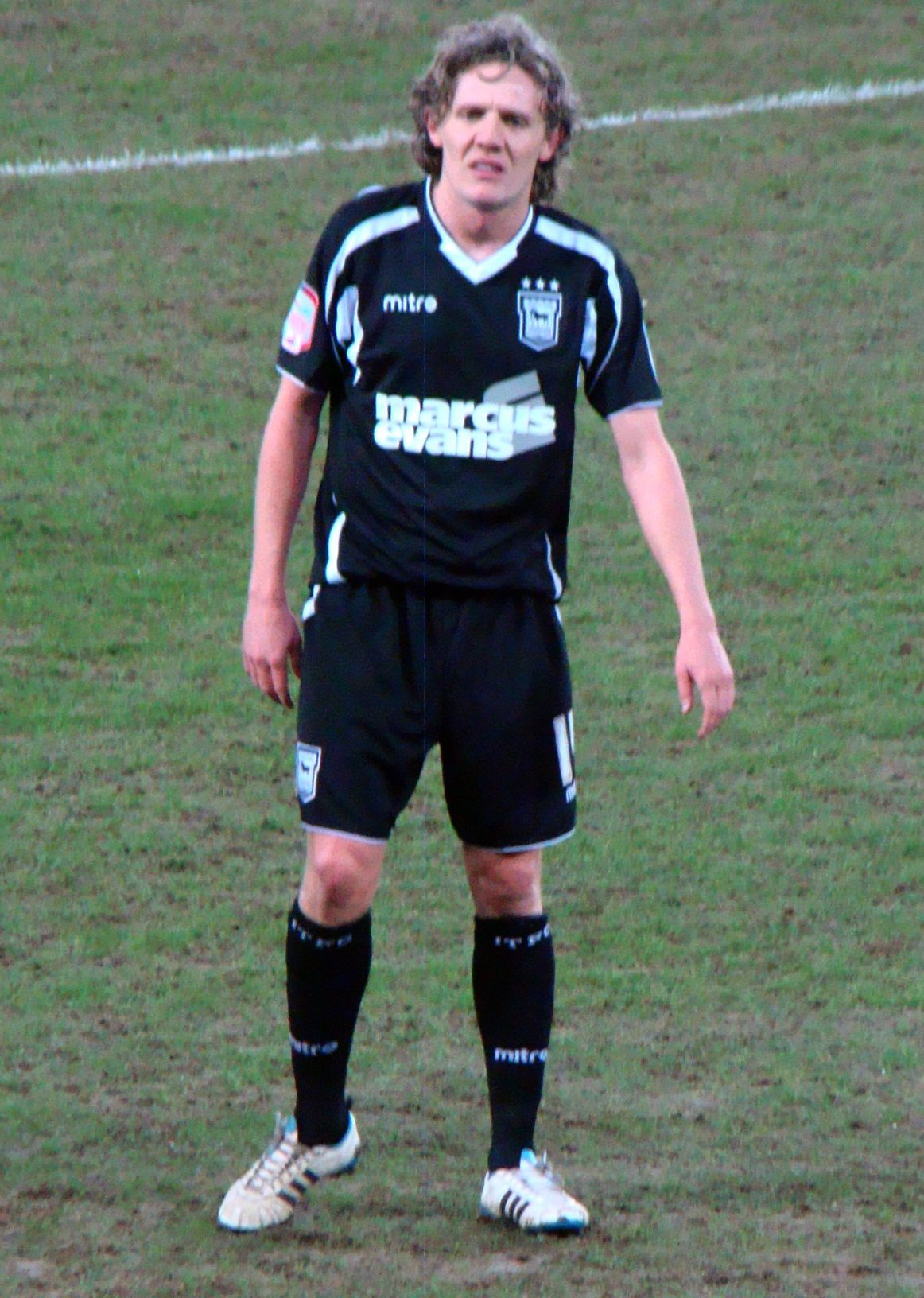
Jimmy Bullard

- Malcolm Allison (1927–2010), football player and manager, lived in Bexley borough and began his career with Welling United and Erith & Belvedere F.C.
- Harry Arter (1989–) footballer (Bournemouth F.C. and Republic of Ireland), born in Sidcup.
- Harry Baker (1990–), footballer, born in Bexleyheath.
- Jimmy Bullard (1978–), Premiership football player, lived in Bexleyheath, attended Erith School.
- Ben Chorley (1982–), footballer (Tranmere Rovers, Leyton Orient, now Bromley F.C.), born in Sidcup.
- Billy Cornelius (1898–?), professional football player and manager, born in Belvedere.
- Jason Crowe (1978–), footballer, born in Sidcup.
- Roy Dwight (1933–2002), footballer (Nottingham Forest), born in Belvedere.
- Jake Goodman (1993–), footballer, lives in Bexleyheath.
- George Green (1891–1958), footballer (Southampton F.C.).
- Joe Healy (1986–), footballer (Welling United), born in Sidcup.
- Kevin Horlock (1972–), Northern Ireland international footballer, born in Erith.
- Deren Ibrahim (1991–), Gibraltarian footballer, born in Sidcup.
- Bill Jaques (1888–1925), footballer, born in Erith.
- Mike Kelly (1954–), footballer (Millwall FC), born in Belvedere.
- Dave Martin (1985–), footballer, born in Erith.
- Douglas McWhirter (1886–1966), amateur footballer, part of the gold medal-winning English team at the 1912 Summer Olympics, born in Erith.
- Alan Morton (1950–), footballer, born in Erith.
- Keith Peacock (1945–) and Gavin Peacock (1967–), father and son footballers, lived in Crayford.
- Mark Ricketts (1984–), footballer, born in Sidcup.
- Liam Ridgewell (1984–), Portland Timbers footballer, born in Bexleyheath, attended Bexleyheath School.
- Wayne Routledge (1985–), footballer, born in Sidcup.
- Steve Rutter (1968–), footballer, born in Erith.
- Sam Saunders (1983–), footballer (Brentford F.C.), born in Erith.

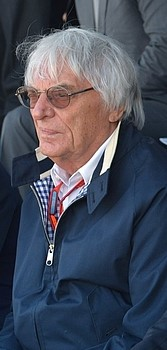
Bernie Ecclestone

- Eric Stephenson (1914–44), footballer (Leeds United), born in Bexleyheath.
- Andy Townsend (1963–), professional footballer, grew up in Bexleyheath, attended Bexleyheath School.
- Gordon Watson (1971–), former Sheffield Wednesday footballer, born in Sidcup.

=== Other sports ===
- Steve Backley (1969–), Olympic javelin-thrower, born in Sidcup.
- Joseph Blackmore (2003-), professional cyclist, born in Sidcup.
- Stephanie Brind (1977–), professional squash player, born in Bexleyheath and lived on Chieveley Road.
- Tony Brise (1952–1975), motor racing driver, born in Erith.
- Lewis Burton (1992–), professional tennis player.
- David Daniels (1942–), cricketer (Bedfordshire), born in Bexleyheath.
- Alec Debnam (1921–2003), cricketer, born in Belvedere.
- Walter Donaldson (1907–73), Scottish snooker player, lived for some years in Grosvenor Road, Belvedere.
- Bernie Ecclestone (1930–), Formula 1 magnate, lived in Danson Road, Bexleyheath, as a child.
- John Gosling (1833–1882), cricketer, born in North Cray.
- Graham Kersey (1971–1997), Surrey county cricketer, attended Beths Grammar School.
- Alan Knott (1946–), cricketer (Kent and England), born in Belvedere, attended Northumberland Heath Secondary Modern School.
- Lennox Lewis (1965–), world heavyweight champion boxer, lived in Crook Log as a child. On 22 July 2012, Lewis was the Olympic Torch-bearer on the day it travelled through Bexley en route to the 2012 London Olympics.
- Henry Nuttall (1855–1945), cricketer, born in Crayford.
- John Regis (1966–), Olympic sprinter, lived in Sidcup.
- Colin Seeley (1938–), champion motorcyclist and later motorbike designer, born in Crayford and lived and worked in Belvedere.
- Derek Ufton (1928–), professional cricket (Kent County Cricket Club) and football (Charlton Athletic) player, born in Crayford.
- Ian Williams (1967–), Olympic fencer, 1992 Summer Olympics, born in Bexleyheath.
- Doug Wright (1914–1998), cricketer (Kent and England), born in Sidcup.

== Other ==
- Marjory Allen, Lady Allen of Hurtwood (1897–1976), landscape architect and child welfare campaigner, born in Bexleyheath.
- Anjem Choudary (1967–), Islamist political activist, born and grew up in Welling.
- David Conner (1947–), Anglican bishop and Dean of Windsor, attended Erith Grammar School (now Erith School).
- Douglas Macmillan (1884–1969), founder of Macmillan Cancer Support, lived in Knoll Road, Sidcup, from 1924 until 1966, and also ran his charity from that address. Bexley Civic Society placed a blue plaque on the house in 2010.
- Jo Malone (1963–), perfumer and businesswoman, raised in a council flat in Bexleyheath.
- Lee Murray (1977–), former kickboxer and mixed martial arts champion, convicted of the Securitas depot robbery, lived in Sidcup.
- Robert Napper (1966–), serial murderer and rapist, born in Erith.
- Emma Noble (1971–), glamour model, born in Sidcup.
- Kenneth Noye (1947–), gangster and convicted murderer, born on Lavernock Road, Bexleyheath, attended Bexleyheath School.
- Bill Peyto (1869–1943), Canadian pioneer and mountain guide, born in Welling.
- Delia Smith (1941–), TV chef, grew up in Bexleyheath, attended Bexleyheath School.
- Denis Thatcher (1915–2003), husband of Prime Minister Margaret Thatcher, headed the family-owned Atlas Preservatives, based in Erith, until 1965.
