= Murder of Jimmy Mizen =

2008 murder case in the United Kingdom

Jimmy Mizen
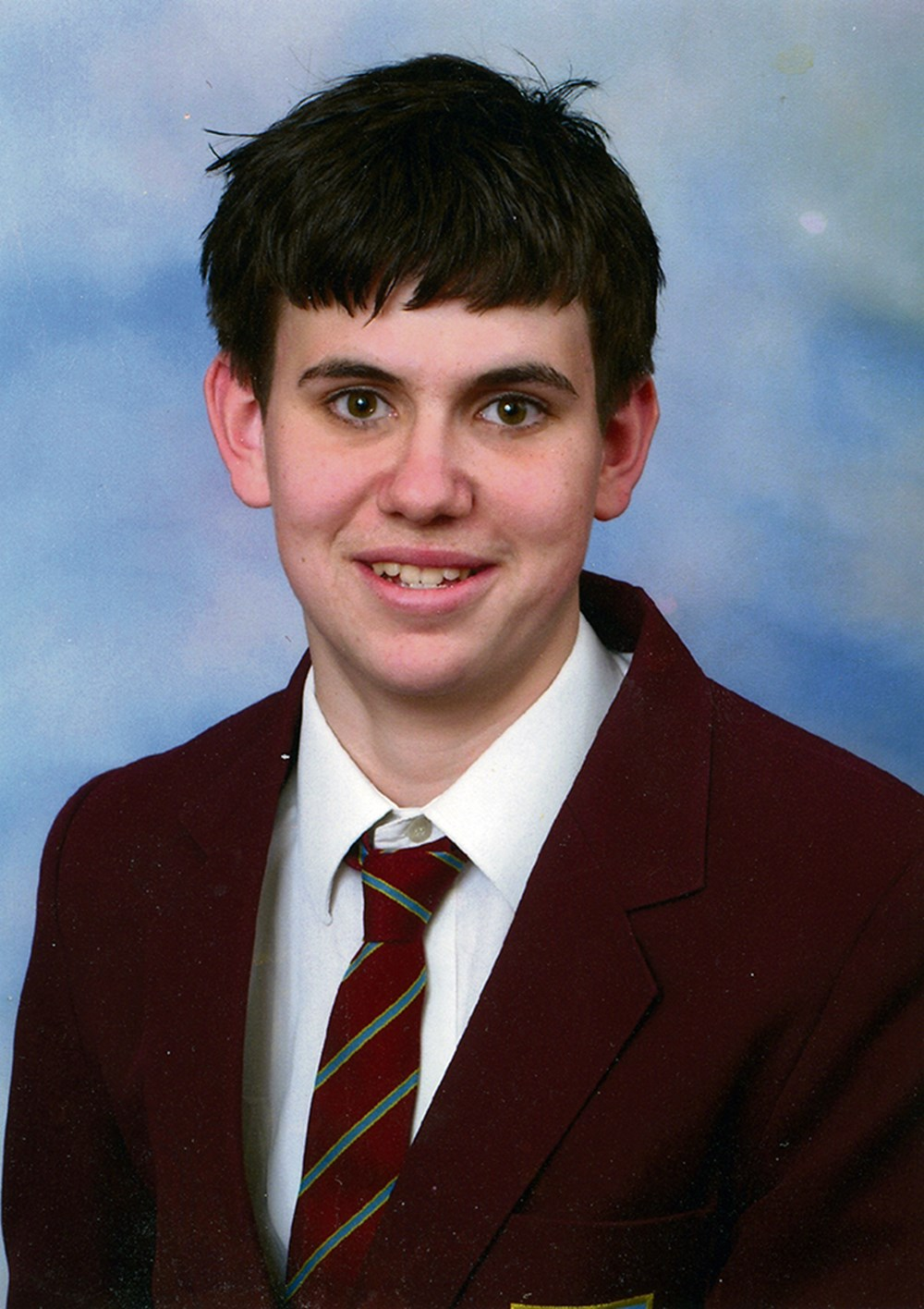
- Jimmy Mizen school photo
- Born: 9 May 1992; London, England
- Died: 10 May 2008 (aged 16); Lee, London, England
- Cause of death: Exsanguination (blood loss)
- Resting place: Grove Park Cemetery
- Parent(s): Margaret Mizen MBE and Barry Mizen MBE
- Website: The Mizen Foundation

Jimmy Mizen (9 May 1992 – 10 May 2008) was a 16-year-old schoolboy who was murdered in Lee, London. A 19-year-old man, Jake Fahri, was convicted in March 2009 of his murder and sentenced to life imprisonment with a minimum term of fourteen years.

== Background ==
Mizen was the sixth son and the eighth of nine children of Barry Colin Mizen and Margaret Annette (née Everson) Mizen. Mizen, who turned 16 years old the day before his death, was 6 feet 4 inches (193 cm) tall and 14 stone (89 kg). He lived in Lee Green and attended St Thomas More Catholic Comprehensive School in Eltham.

Jake Fahri had a string of convictions involving robbery and violence. On 19 July 2004, he was given a nine-month referral order for taking part in a gang knife-point robbery of a schoolboy at Falconwood railway station in Bexley, Greater London. On 4 January 2005, he was given a twelve-month supervision order for the robbery of an adult in Greenwich Park on 13 April 2004. On 13 April 2006, he was given an eighteen-month supervision order for an unprovoked assault on a girl in the street and burglary.

The Mizen family had had previous dealings with Jake Fahri. In 2001, he walked up to Jimmy Mizen's brother, Harry, in the street and asked for money before punching him in the stomach. Harry, who was 10 years old, handed over 20p but told his mother about the incident and she made a complaint to Fahri's school. Two years later, on 1 April 2003, Fahri saw Harry in Woodyates Road, Lee, and demanded to know why he had 'grassed'. Harry tried to escape but Fahri grabbed hold of his shirt and threatened to beat him up before punching him in the chest. Police visited Fahri's home on 7 May 2003 to speak to him about the incident and gave him a harassment warning. The culmination of these events was the incident in which Jimmy was murdered.

== Murder ==
At approximately 11:30 in the morning of 10 May 2008, a day after his sixteenth birthday, Mizen was inside the Three Cooks Bakery in Burnt Ash Hill, south London, with his brother, Harry. Jake Fahri, 19, of Lee, entered the shop and an altercation began when Jimmy stood up to threats being made against him by Fahri.

Fahri challenged Mizen to go outside; Mizen refused. Not wanting to lose face after picking the fight, Fahri went back into the shop and hit him with two plastic drink bottles. The Mizen brothers defended themselves and traded punches with Fahri before all three crashed into a glass cake display and Fahri was bundled out of the shop.

Fahri then re-entered the shop with a metal-framed advertising sign and started poking Mizen with it. Mizen held onto the sign and Fahri reached for a 12-inch (30 cm) hot glass dish from the counter and threw it at Mizen. Shattering on his chin, a one-and-a-half-inch glass shard pierced his neck and severed vital blood vessels. According to witnesses, Fahri exited the bakery with a triumphant grin on his face.

Mizen staggered to the rear of the bakery and into a cupboard to shield himself from the possibility of Fahri returning, where his elder brother, Tommy, who was 27 at the time, found him. Mizen collapsed in his brother's arms and was so afraid of the attack that when his brother tried to open the cupboard door, he held it closed, thinking that it was Fahri. Their mother, Margaret, arrived soon after and fainted at the sight of her son. When she regained consciousness, she called her husband, Barry, who arrived an hour later to find that his son had died.

== Arrest and conviction ==
Fahri handed himself into police custody three days after the attack. In police recordings of his interviews, Fahri commented: "Someone has died because of me. I didn't mean it, I didn't mean to kill him." Fahri was remanded in custody and stood trial at the Central Criminal Court on 11 March 2009 for the murder of Jimmy Mizen before Mr Justice Calvert-Smith and a jury. At his trial, Fahri admitted to throwing the glass dish but denied murder.

Crispin Aylett QC, prosecuting, said: "A trivial incident, brought about by the defendant's rudeness, escalated into something horrific. The defendant reached for any and every available weapon with which to attack the Mizen brothers. The whole incident lasted no more than three minutes – three minutes of absolute madness on the part of this defendant."

Pathologist Benjamin Swift told the court that Mizen died from blood loss. A glass shard had severed the carotid artery and jugular veins, which were both 0.4in (1 cm) below the skin near the jaw.

The jury rejected Fahri's version of events and found him guilty of murder. He was sentenced to life imprisonment with a minimum term of fourteen years.

On 2 November 2009, Fahri was stabbed by Sean Mercer, the murderer of Rhys Jones, in prison. Fahri was taken to hospital and survived the attack.

Fahri was released on licence from prison in June 2023. On 16 January 2025, it was reported that Jimmy Mizen's mother, Margaret, had expressed shock that Fahri was trying to gain status for himself as a drill artist and had released a rap song that made specific references to the murder of her son. The following day, the Probation Service announced that Fahri had been recalled to prison for breaching his licence conditions.

== The Mizen Foundation ==
In 2009, the Mizen family set up The Jimmy Mizen Foundation charity based in Lee Green. The charity has worked with schools across the United Kingdom to help young people to make their local communities safer. On 19 December 2009, at The Valley, players of Charlton Athletic and Millwall football clubs wore special kits in honour of murdered local teenagers Mizen and Rob Knox, and their supporters. The logos of both clubs' shirt sponsors were replaced by the text: "Street violence ruins lives", with the shirts later auctioned to raise funds for the Foundation and for the Rob Knox Memorial Fund.

In 2010, The Tablet named the Mizen family as among Britain's most influential Roman Catholics. Mizen's parents, Barry and Margaret, were both appointed Member of the Order of the British Empire (MBE) in the 2014 New Year Honours for services to young people in London.
