= North Cray =

Coordinates: 51.424°N 0.135°E

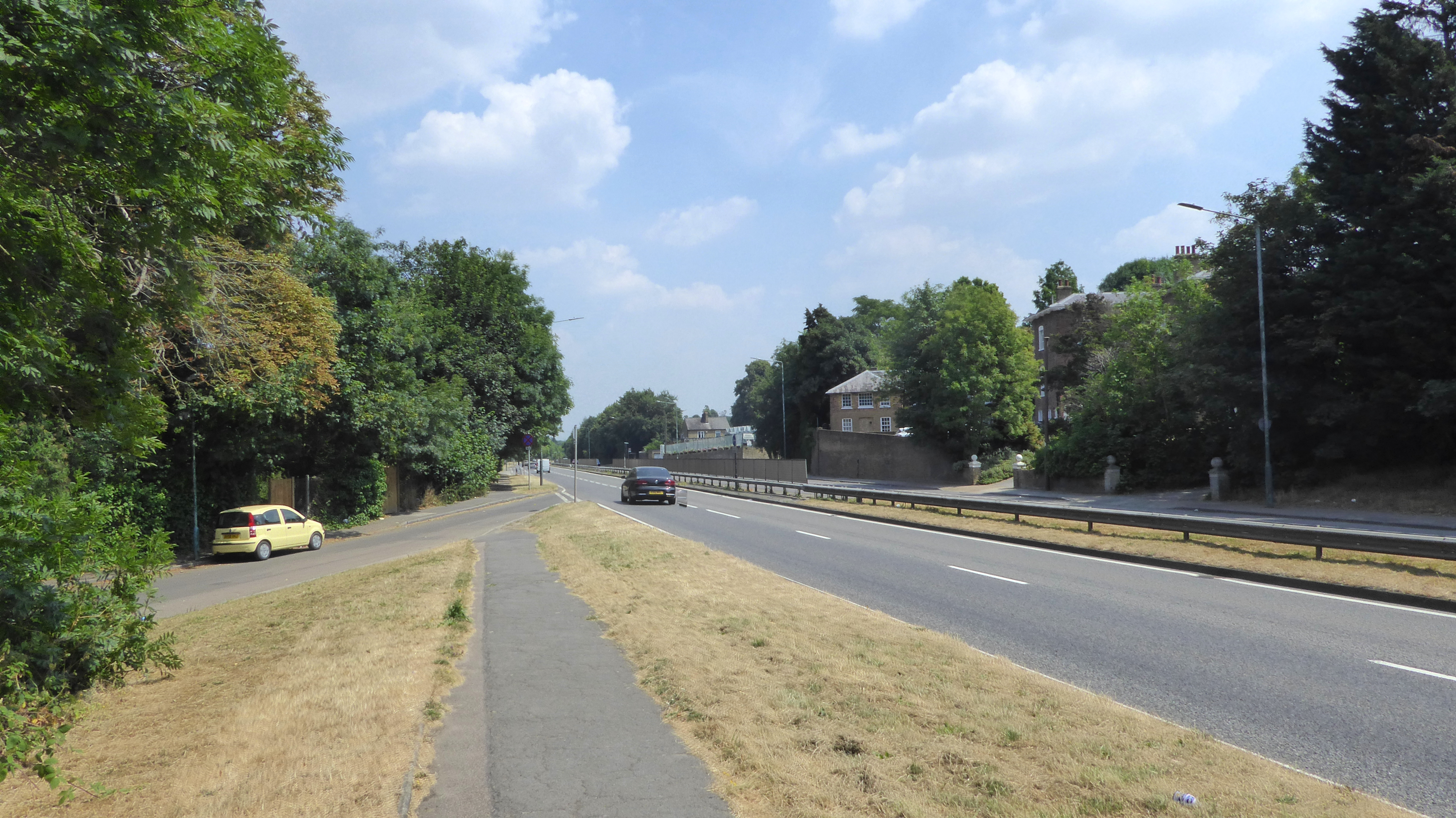
- North Cray Road

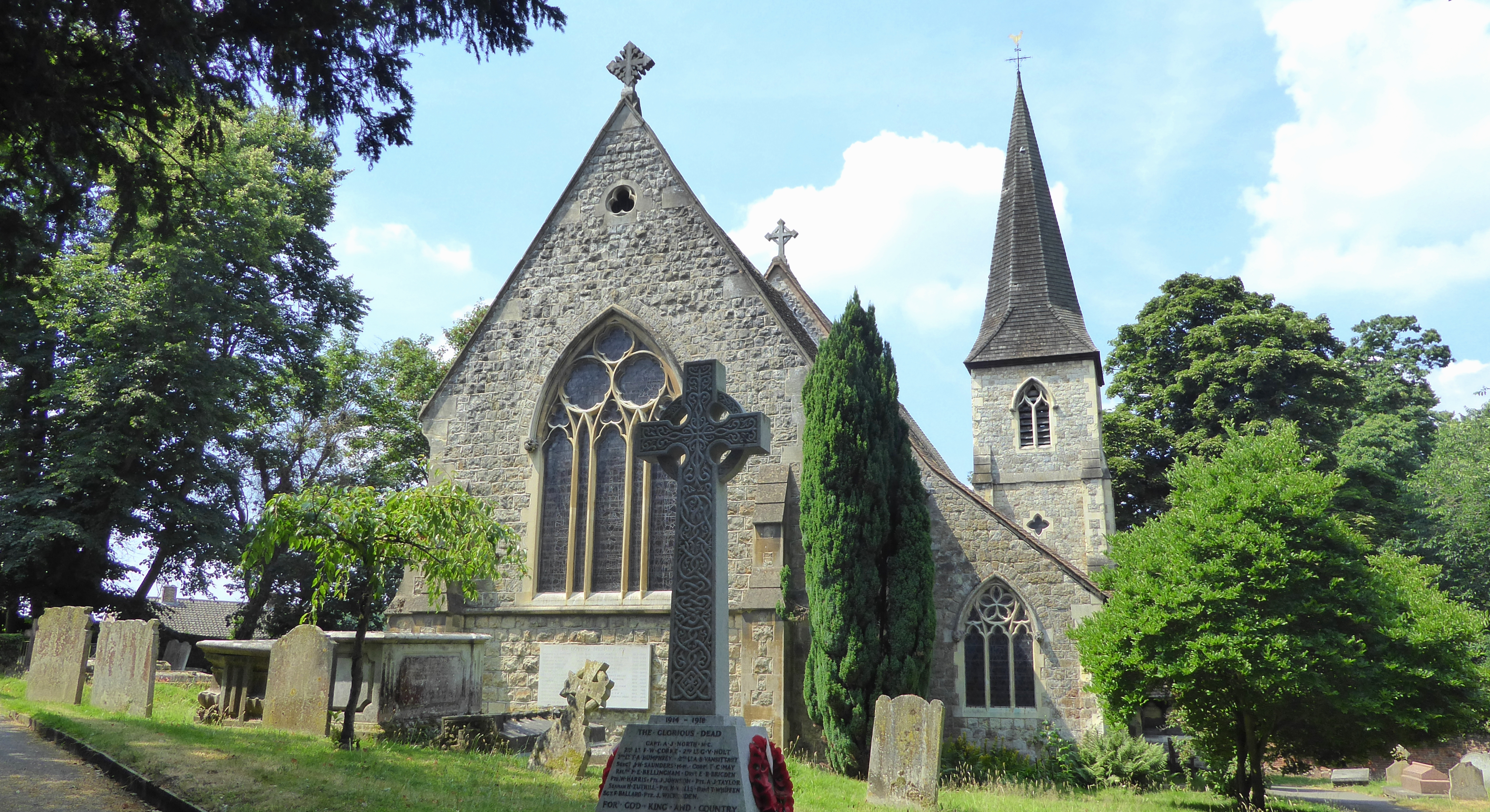
- St James' Church in North Cray

- Location within Greater London
- OS grid reference: TQ487722
  - Charing Cross: 12.6 mi (20.3 km) NW
- London borough: Bexley
- Ceremonial county: Greater London
- Region: London
- Country: England
- Sovereign state: United Kingdom
- Post town: SIDCUP
- Postcode district: DA14
- Dialling code: 020
- Police: Metropolitan
- Fire: London
- Ambulance: London
- UK Parliament: Old Bexley and Sidcup
- London Assembly: Bexley and Bromley

North Cray is an area in South East London, England, within the London Borough of Bexley. It is located east of Sidcup and south of Bexleyheath and is 12.6 miles (20.3 km) south-east of Charing Cross, the traditional centre of London in the Metropolitan Green Belt.

== History ==
=== Early history ===
North Cray was previously a civil parish in the hundred of Ruxley, Sutton-at-Hone Lathe. The settlement Ruxley had its own parish but it was abolished in 1557 and the area was absorbed into North Cray parish.

=== Modern history ===
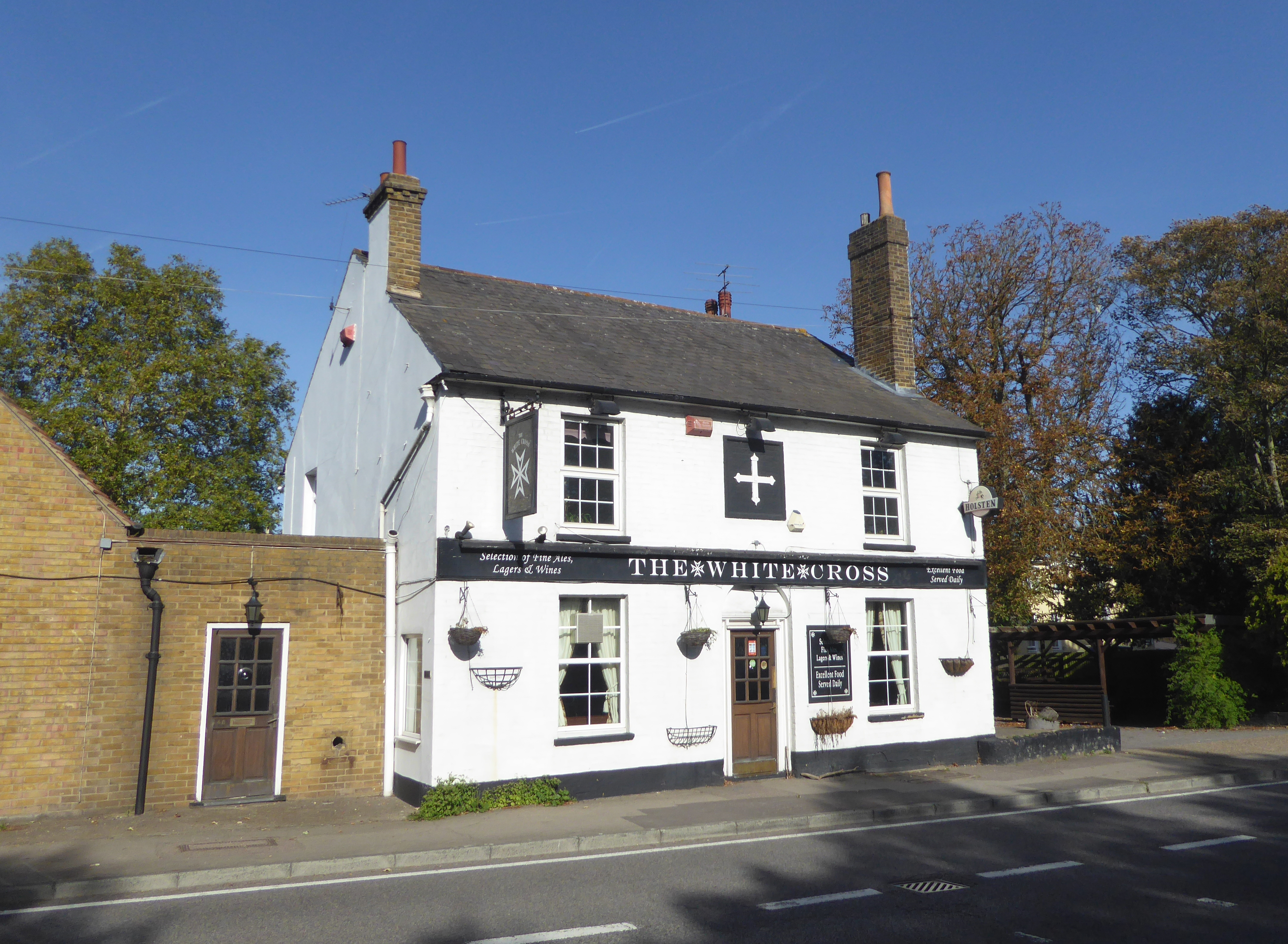
The White Cross pub

North Cray was within Kent until the creation of Greater London in 1965. From 1894 to 1934 North Cray was a civil parish in the Bromley Rural District. At the 1931 census, North Cray had a population of 1101. On 1 April 1934 the parish was abolished to form "Chislehurst and Sidcup" and became part of Chislehurst and Sidcup Urban District. In 1965 it became part of the London Borough of Bexley which it remains today.

== Transport ==
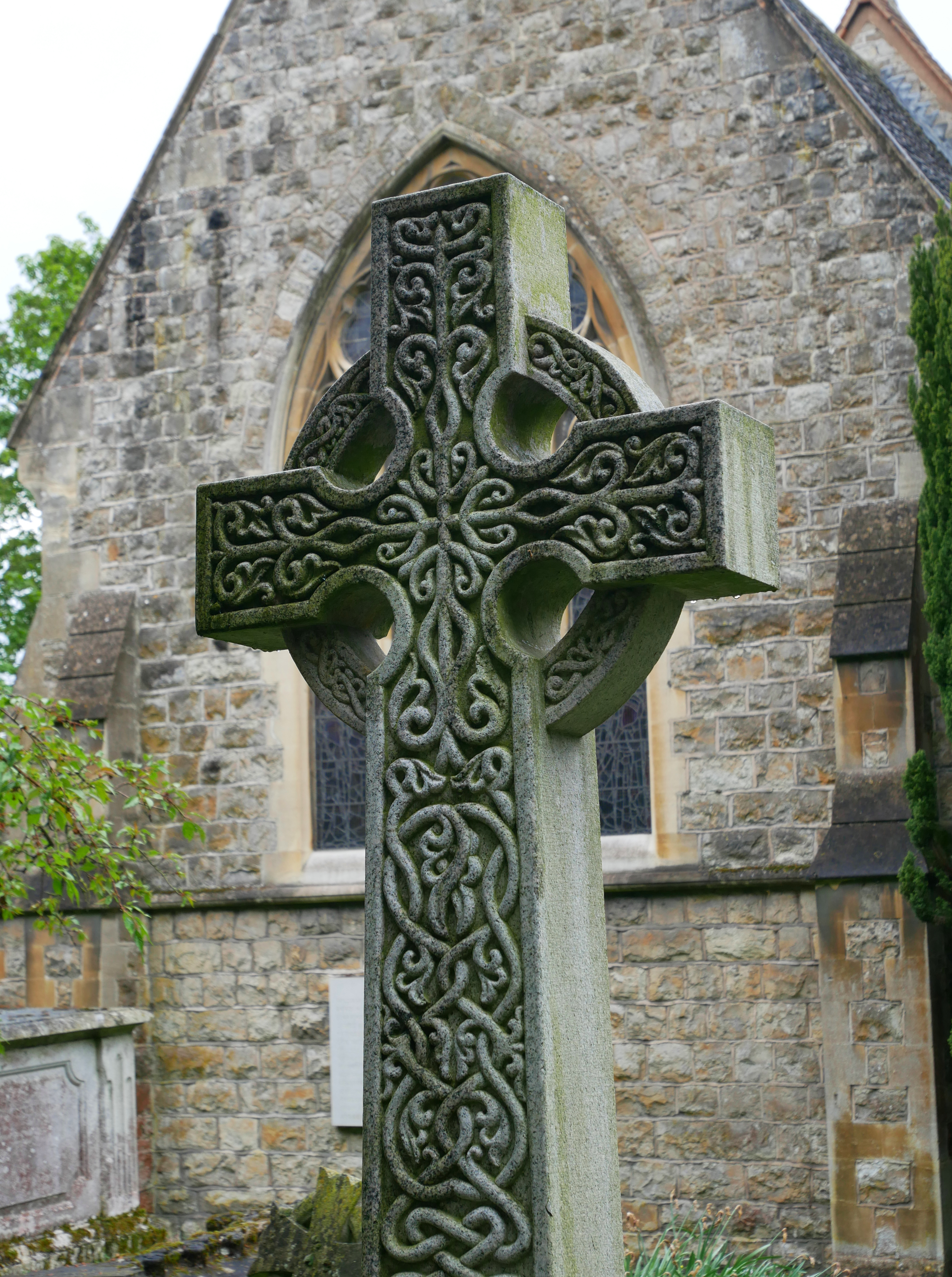
The Grade II listed war memorial in North Cray

=== Buses ===
- 492 to Bluewater via Bexley, Bexleyheath, Crayford, Dartford, Stone & Greenhithe or to Sidcup via Ruxley & Foots Cray. Operated by Arriva London for London Buses.

=== Rail ===
The nearest National Rail stations to North Cray are Sidcup and Bexley, which both provide services to London Charing Cross, Dartford and Gravesend. The stations are connected to North Cray via the 492 London bus service.

== Notable people ==
North Cray briefly became the centre of international attention in August 1822 when Robert Stewart, Viscount Castlereagh, the Foreign Secretary, committed suicide at his country home Loring Hall.

Other notable people associated with the area include geologist Joshua Trimmer, colonial administrator Harry Ord, and cricketer John Gosling, all of whom were born in North Cray.
