= Beths Grammar School =

Coordinates: 51.447°N 0.151°E

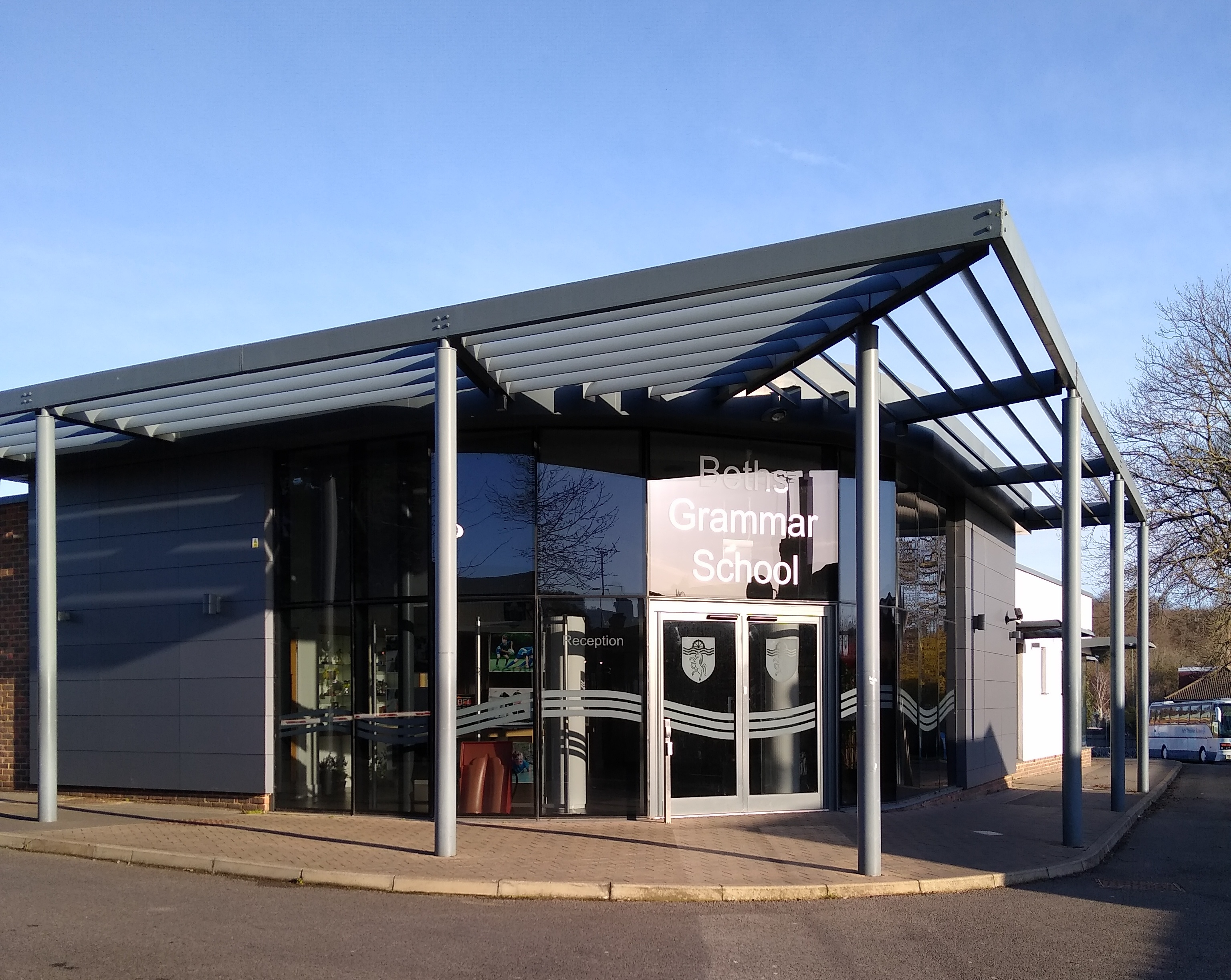

Location
- Hartford Road; Bexley, London, DA5 1NE; England

Information
- Type: Grammar School; Academy
- Established: 1945
- Department for Education URN: 136334 Tables
- Ofsted: Reports
- Head teacher: Mrs O'Donnel
- Gender: Boys; Sixth Form (16+)
- Age: 11 to 18
- Enrolment: 1,300 pupils
- Houses: Abbey; Brampton; Cray; Eardley; Hurst; Wickham
- Colour: Royal blue
- Former Pupils: Old Bethsonians / Old [Beths] Boy
- Website: http://www.beths.bexley.sch.uk/

Beths Grammar School, commonly known as Beths, is an all-boys grammar school with academy status in Bexley in South East London. Pupils are admitted from the age of 11, with girls joining the sixth form in Year 12. It became a grammar school in 1976 and has performed above average within the borough; in 2006 being fourth of the ten larger schools ranked by A*-C grades at GCSE.

== History ==
The school was founded in 1945 as Erith Technical School, Holly Hill Road: Principal E. Alec Wolf. Specialising in technical subjects such as Mechanical Engineering, Building Construction and Academic. The buildings (opposite the Seamans Home) were shared with the then Erith Grammar School. To facilitate the school's expansion in 1960–61, it was moved to its current site near Bexley village, and its name was changed to Bexley/Erith Technical School to reflect its new location. A few years later, this was expanded to Bexley/Erith Technical High School for Boys; the name it maintained for several decades and giving rise to the school's common name, BETHS or B.E.T.H.S. The school was later granted grammar school status, and became known as BETHS Grammar School for Boys until the most recent change to Beths Grammar School.

In 1995, the school was awarded DfES Technology College specialist status, which provided extra funds for Design and Technology, ICT, Science and Mathematics. In 1998 the school won the School Sports Award, recognising the achievement of the school in Rugby and Football, the two main school sports, and others.

James Skinner joined the school as headmaster in 2002 and oversaw the school's most rapid period of expansion and development. In 2006, the school gained an additional specialism as a Modern Foreign Languages College. He retired from his position at the end of the 2014/15 academic year.

Christopher Maxim became the new Headteacher in September 2015 and resigned at Easter 2017. Richard Blyghton was appointed as his successor, before announcing his retirement in early 2026 and having his successor start in the 2026/27 school year

== Notable former pupils ==
- Steve Backley – Former Olympic athlete – javelin
- Alexander Cobb – Actor; known for Indian Summers (2015), National Theatre Live: The Magistrate (2012), Mr Selfridge (2013)
- Bradley Dack – Footballer
- Graham Kersey – Former county cricketer
- Rob Knox – Actor (Harry Potter and the Half-Blood Prince)
- Neal Lawson – Political commentator and Chairman of Compass
- Adam Riley – County cricketer
- Adam Ball – County cricketer
- Samuel Edozie – Footballer
- Jubril Okedina – Footballer
- Lewis Bate – Footballer
- Richard Chin - Footballer

== See also ==
- Grammar schools in the United Kingdom
- List of schools in Bexley
