= Rob Knox =

British actor (1989-2008)

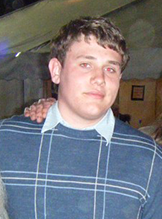
- Knox on the set of Harry Potter and the Half-Blood Prince in 2008
- Born: Robert Arthur Knox; 21 August 1989; Kent, England
- Died: 24 May 2008 (aged 18); Sidcup, London, England
- Cause of death: Murder by stabbing
- Occupation: Actor
- Years active: 2000–2008

Robert Arthur Knox (21 August 1989 – 24 May 2008) was an English actor who portrayed the character of Marcus Belby in the film Harry Potter and the Half-Blood Prince, and had signed to appear in its sequel Harry Potter and the Deathly Hallows – Part 1.

Having studied at Beths Grammar School, Bexley, Knox began acting aged 11, gaining small roles in British television shows like The Bill, After You've Gone and Trust Me, I'm a Teenager. His first cinematic appearance was as an extra in King Arthur (2004).

Knox died after being stabbed outside a bar in Sidcup, Southeast London, in May 2008, when he intervened in a fight to protect his brother. His murder attracted widespread attention in the British press, and his assailant, Karl Norman Bishop, was subsequently sentenced to life imprisonment, with a minimum 20-year non-parole period. An annual film festival, the Rob Knox Film Festival, was created in 2008 to commemorate him, by the Rob Knox Foundation which helps fund training for young local people in the arts. The final festival was held in September of 2025.

== Early life and career ==
Knox was born to Colin and Sally Knox in 1989. He was a pupil at Beths Grammar School, Bexley. He had been acting since the age of 11, and his first credited role was a small part in an episode of the ITV police drama The Bill and he also appeared in the Channel 4 reality show Trust Me, I'm a Teenager, and the BBC comedy After You've Gone. He had previously appeared as an extra in a number of productions. The first film Knox appeared in was King Arthur in 2004. He also appeared on Tonight with Trevor McDonald.

== Harry Potter ==
In 2007, casting began for the role of Marcus Belby in Harry Potter and the Half-Blood Prince, the film adaptation of British author J. K. Rowling's best-selling novel and the sixth installment of the Harry Potter film series.

Knox posthumously appeared in Harry Potter and the Half-Blood Prince (2009).

Although his character does not appear in the seventh novel, Knox had signed on to reprise his role as Marcus Belby in the production of Harry Potter and the Deathly Hallows.

== Murder and aftermath ==
Knox was stabbed to death at the age of 18 outside the Metro Bar in Sidcup, Southeast London, on 24 May 2008. He had intervened in a fight to protect his 17-year-old brother Jamie, who was being threatened by a man armed with two kitchen knives. Warner Bros. released a statement concerning his death: "We are all shocked and saddened by this news and at this time our sympathies are with his family."

=== Arrest and trial of Karl Bishop ===
Karl Norman Bishop (born 1987 in Lewisham, Southeast London), from Carlton Road, Sidcup, was charged with the murder. He was taken into custody, and remained there until his trial, which began in February 2009. Bishop was found guilty of murder on 4 March 2009, and received a life sentence with a minimum of 20 years before being considered for parole. Police reported that he showed no remorse for the crime.

== Tribute ==
Players of Charlton Athletic and Millwall football clubs wore special kits on 19 December 2009, at The Valley, in honour of murdered local teenagers Knox and Jimmy Mizen, and their supporters. The logos of both clubs' shirt sponsors were replaced by the text: "Street violence ruins lives", with the shirts later auctioned to raise funds for the Rob Knox Memorial Fund and the Jimmy Mizen Foundation. In 2021, a documentary, (K)nox: The Rob Knox Story, about Knox's life and murder premiered at the London Independent Film Festival, then being released on ITVX.

== Filmography ==
Film
Year	Title	Role	Notes
2004	King Arthur	Extra	Uncredited
2009	Harry Potter and the Half-Blood Prince	Marcus Belby	Released posthumously
2021	(K)nox: The Rob Knox Story	Himself	Released posthumously
Television
Year	Title	Role	Notes
2000	The Bill	Unknown	1 episode
2003	Trust me I'm a Teenager	Himself	
2007	After You've Gone	Josh	2 episodes

== See also ==
- Murder of Ben Kinsella – Kinsella was another child actor who was stabbed to death in 2008 whilst still a teenager
- Sally Anne Bowman – a British model who was also murdered in London.
