= (K)nox: The Rob Knox Story =

2021 documentary film

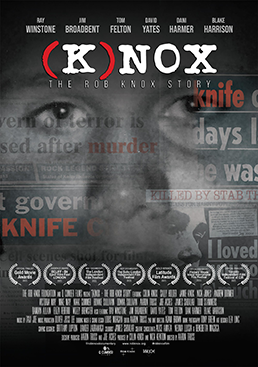
- Official Poster
- Directed by: Aaron Truss
- Produced by: Colin Knox; Aaron Truss; Joe Acres; Nick Kenton; Koulla Anastasi
- Edited by: Aaron Truss
- Music by: Taxi Joe
- Production companies: Q Cumber Films; The Rob Knox Foundation
- Distributed by: Woodcut International
- Release date: April 9, 2021
- Running time: 50 minutes
- Country: United Kingdom
- Language: English

(K)nox: The Rob Knox Story is a British documentary about the life and murder of Harry Potter actor Rob Knox, who was killed in 2008. The film is directed by Aaron Truss and features interviews with Knox's friends, family, and colleagues in the film and TV industry. The film also highlights the knife crime crisis in the UK since 2008, after Knox's death. The title of the documentary is a reference not only to Rob Knox, but the Nox charm used in Harry Potter that extinguishes the light at the end of a wand.

== Interviewees ==
- Ray Winstone
- Jim Broadbent
- Tom Felton
- David Yates
- Dani Harmer
- Blake Harrison

== Production ==
Director Aaron Truss was approached by Rob Knox's father, Colin Knox, to direct the documentary in 2018. Both Aaron and Rob were childhood friends, training to be young actors together at D&B Theatre School. A handful of interviews had been shot prior to Truss' involvement, with Truss beginning production on the documentary in 2018 with B-roll and new interviews. The first interview was conducted in 2019 with Ray Winstone. Winstone claimed, "Some of my favourite jobs that I've done have been about social points, like Nil by Mouth or Scum. They're being made for a certain reason. Well, I guess that's where you place the documentary that we made because Scum was based on reality. Nil by Mouth was based on reality as a real story but was dramatised. But the thing about the documentary is, we've gone a step further, where it is purely reality". Aaron Truss would also act as executive producer alongside Joe Acres, with Colin Knox as producer.

Rupert Grint, David Heyman and David Yates attended a church service for Rob Knox after his death. At the service, both Heyman and Yates presented Colin Knox with footage of Rob Knox as Marcus Belby in Harry Potter and the Half-Blood Prince, this included bloopers and scenes he was involved in. This footage would be used in the documentary, including footage that Rob had filmed himself behind the scenes, provided by Rob's brother, Jamie Knox. Attempts were made to secure an interview with Mayor of London, Sadiq Khan, to talk about the state of knife crime in London specifically, but the team were turned down and offered Sophie Linden instead. A number of Knox's friends turned down the opportunity to be interviewed on camera due to the ongoing trauma of the events on the night that Rob was murdered. Daniel Radcliffe and Emma Watson also declined to appear in the documentary, with Radcliffe citing that he didn't want to mislead audiences into thinking he was close friends with Knox.

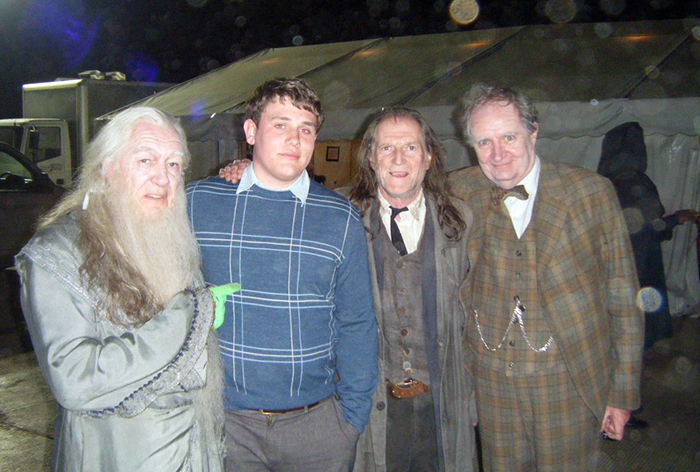
A BTS photo of Michael Gambon, Rob Knox, David Bradley and Jim Broadbent on the set of Harry Potter and the Half-Blood Prince.

David Yates was instrumental in getting Jim Broadbent to take part in the documentary, due to the scene he shared with Knox in the Slughorn Supper scene in Harry Potter and the Half-Blood Prince. David Yates was also responsible for speaking to the Wizarding World, allowing the production team to film in Olivanders at the Warner Bros. Studio Tour, where Rob Knox's name appears on a wand box. Producer Nick Kenton was brought on board to help shorten the length of the documentary for television, as well as Alice Amata, Neuma Llusia and Benedetta Magoga as creative consultants to assist throughout the editing process, making sure the film would not become biased. Colour grading for the documentary would take place on the set of Peaky Blinders, which would be worked on by James Shovlar in his downtime. The documentary's soundtrack was written and composed by Taxi Joe, with Colin Knox specifically commissioning the artists to provide a single that could pay tribute to his son's legacy. Film composer, Lorne Balfe also provided Taxi Joe with advice and insight into the execution of the documentary's soundtrack.

Production wrapped in 2020 with Tom Felton as the last interview for the documentary. Felton was unable to meet with the film crew during the COVID-19 lockdown, so he hired his own crew to film his interview. The film was screened to Rob's family in private due to the emotional nature of the film. According to Colin Knox, everyone involved with the documentary "didn't ask for a single penny" whilst working on the documentary. In 2021, the film landed an international distribution deal at Woodcut Media, with Koulla Anastasi in an executive producer role.

== Release ==
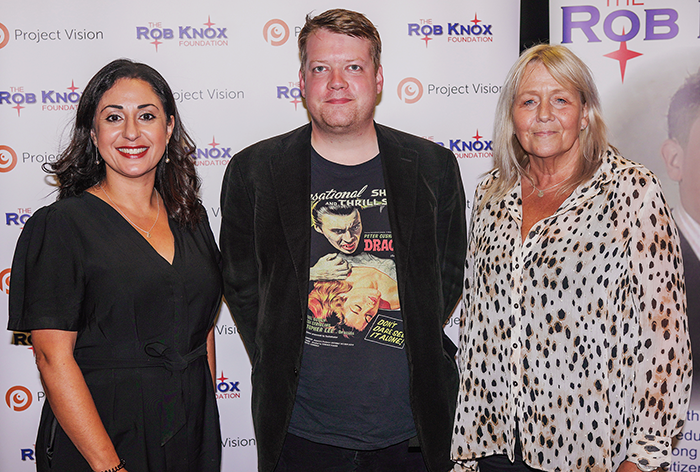
Koulla Anastasi (Woodcut Media), Aaron Truss (Film Director) and Sally Holder (Mother of Rob Knox) attending the Rob Knox Film Festival 2021.

(K)nox: The Rob Knox Story received it world premiere at the London Independent Film Festival On April 9, 2021. It then received its European television premiere on the Sky Crime channel on December 29, 2022, before being broadcast on ITV in the UK on February 23, 2023.

The documentary was also released on ITVX on the same day.

In 2024, the documentary was purchased by BBC Select in the United States as well as Dox TV in Hungary.

== Director's cut ==
An extended director's cut of (K)nox: The Rob Knox Story received its world premiere at the Picturehouse Central on September 28, 2024. Truss filmed a new documentary called (K)nox: 16 Years Later at the premiere of the extended cut.

== Reception ==
(K)nox: The Rob Knox Story received generally positive reviews. Martin Unsworth of Starburst Magazine praised the film in his review, saying, "As much a vehicle to highlight the horrors of knife crime as a tribute to an enthusiastic actor, the documentary is powerful and often harrowing."

Writing for The Telegraph, Anita Singh praised the film for its decidedly simplistic approach to its subject matter, saying, "That simplicity is the film's strength because there is nothing complicated about the message: knife crime is a scourge, and it is out of control." Tracy Dunstan of MuggleNet awarded it a similarly positive review, saying, "(K)nox: The Rob Knox Story is a sad story but an important one and definitely worth your time." John Higgins of Film and TV Now awarded the film four stars and praised it for the solutions it offers towards solving knife crime, saying "The film attempts to add balance and perspective to the ongoing arguments and discussions that prevention is better than cure"

It won the Award for Best Feature Documentary at the London Independent Film Festival, the Audience Award at the Be Epic London International Film Festival, Best Documentary at the Soho London Independent Film Festival, and the Gold Award at the Latitude Film Awards. It was also an official finalist at the Toronto Independent Film Festival & The Gold Movie Awards, and was an Official Semi-Finalist at the Flickers' Rhode Island International Film Festival.
