= Loring Hall =

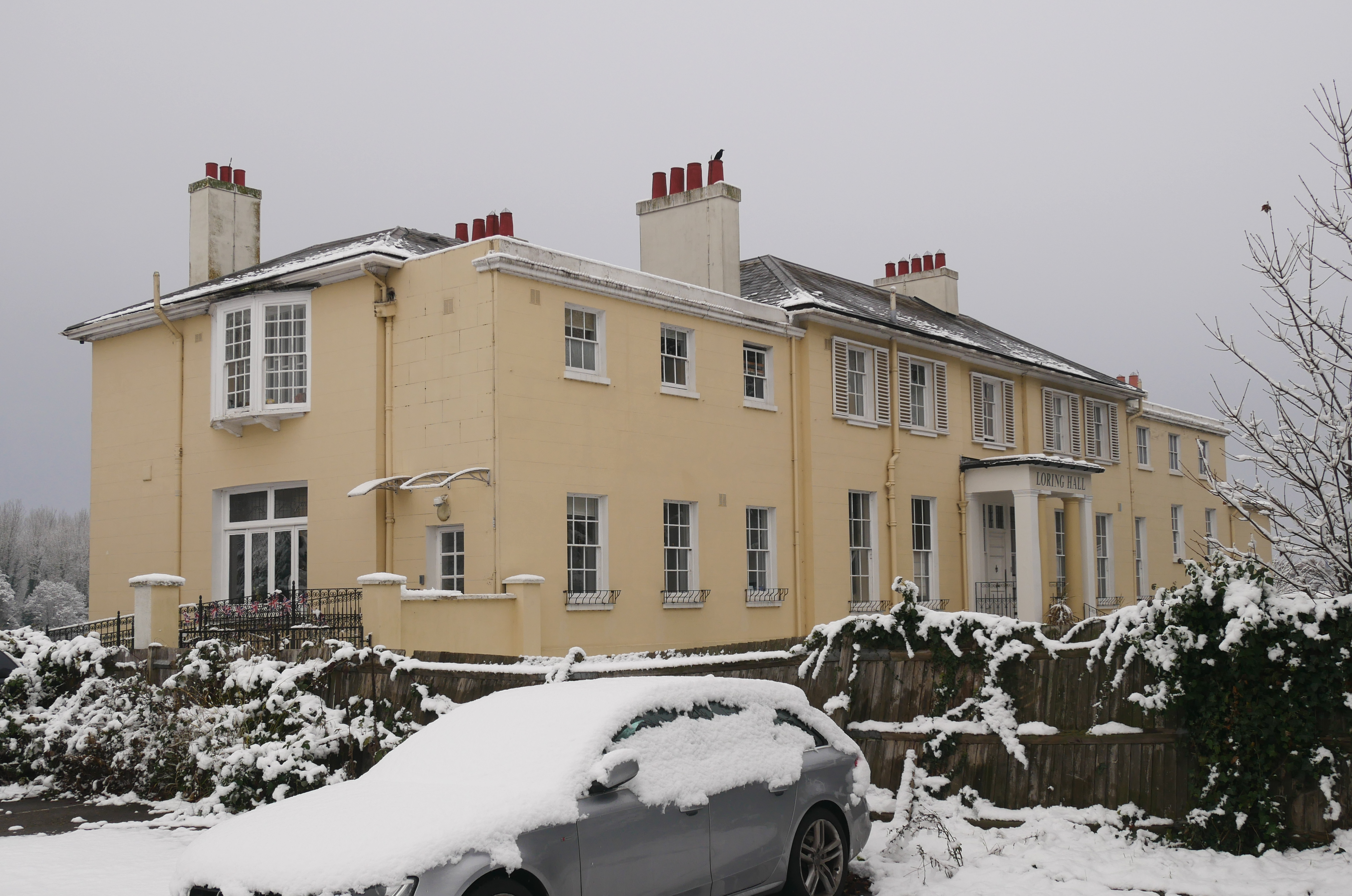
- Loring Hall

- Location within Bexley

Geography
- Location: North Cray, London, England
- Coordinates: 51°25′51″N 0°8′22″E

Organisation
- Type: Specialist

Services
- Emergency department: No
- Speciality: Psychiatry

Helipads
- Helipad: No

History
- Founded: 2004

Loring Hall is a private mental health care facility in North Cray, London Borough of Bexley. Formerly known as Wollet Hall or Woollet Hall, it is a Grade II listed building.

== History ==
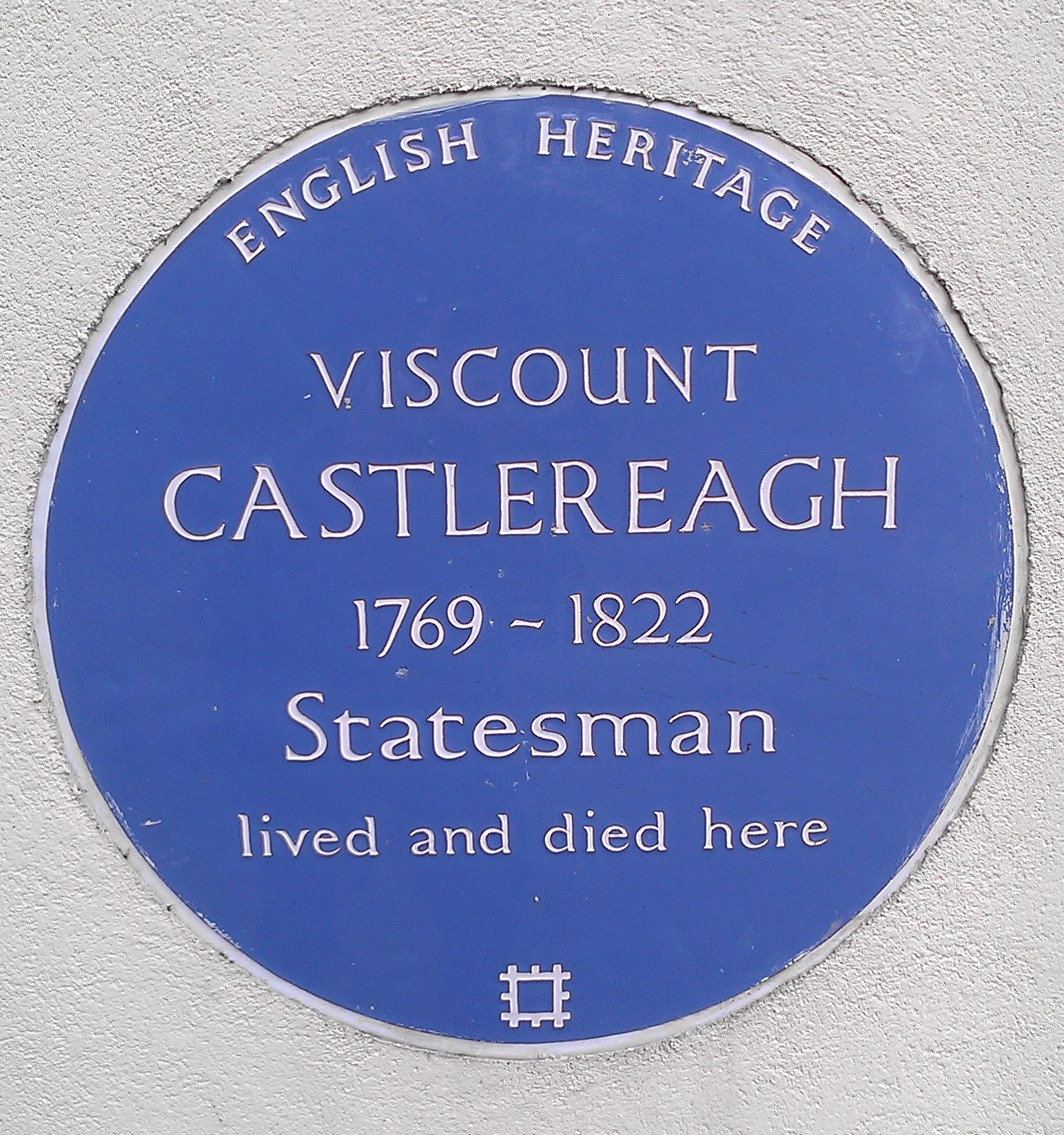
Blue plaque

The present building was constructed in 1760 on the site of an earlier Tudor house known as "Waletts". Its owner in this period was Neighbour Frith, Esq, a London silk merchant. Frith was the last member of a family who had held land in North Cray for many years: his father, John, and grandfather, Roger, are buried at nearby North Cray parish church.

In 1776, Frith willed Woollet Hall to his nephew, the Rev. Edward Cockayn, who adopted the surname Frith. Cockayn subsequently leased the house to a Mr Trimmer, probably Joshua Kirby Trimmer of Bexleyheath, whose son, the geologist Joshua Trimmer, was born at North Cray.

From 1811, the house was the country residence of British Foreign Secretary, Viscount Castlereagh, later Marquess of Londonderry. In 1822, Castlereagh, after suffering a possible nervous breakdown, committed suicide there by cutting his own throat, aged 53. His residence at the house is still commemorated by a blue plaque installed by English Heritage.

Subsequent to Castlereagh's ownership the house was owned by a banker, Richard Gosling. The Gosling family did not use the name Woollet Hall during their time there. By the 1850s, the Hall had been purchased by Frederick Friend, whose family occupied it until the late 19th century.

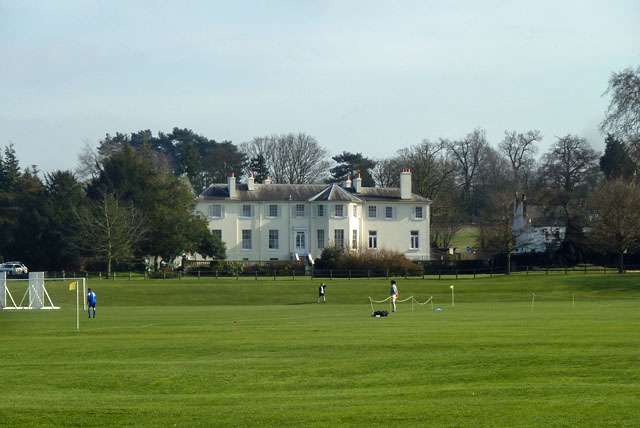
The west face of Loring Hall, from Foots Cray Meadows.

In 1939, the building and grounds were purchased by Goldsmiths College and Woollet Hall was renamed Loring Hall after the first warden of Goldsmiths College, Captain William Loring, who was killed at Gallipoli during the First World War. The main part of the hall was used as a hall of residence for male students and the stable block and associated house were used as an accommodation for a Head of Hall. The grounds became football, hockey and cricket fields for use by the students of Goldsmiths.

Goldsmiths College sold the hall and grounds to Bupa in the 1980s, who converted it into a care home. In 1999, it was bought by the charity Sargent Cancer Care for Children and was renamed Malcolm Sargent House.

In 2003, it was sold again to a company called Oakfields Care, and since March 2004, it has operated as a care facility for those with learning disabilities.

== See also ==
- Healthcare in Kent
