= Graham Kersey =

English cricketer (1971–1997)

Personal information
- Full name: Graham James Kersey
- Born: 19 May 1971; Plumstead, London, England
- Died: 1 January 1997 (aged 25); Brisbane, Queensland, Australia
- Batting: Right-handed
- Role: Wicket-keeper

Domestic team information
- Years: Team
- 1991–1992: Kent
- 1993–1996: Surrey

Career statistics
Competition	First-class	List A
Matches	53	30
Runs scored	1,578	292
Batting average	23.20	16.22
100s/50s	0/9	0/1
Top score	83	50
Catches/stumpings	169/12	30/5
- Source: CricInfo, 26 February 2018

Graham James Kersey (19 May 1971 – 1 January 1997) was an English professional cricketer who played for Kent and Surrey in the 1990s.

Kersey was born at Plumstead in south London and educated at Beths Grammar School in Bexley. A wicket-keeper, he first played for Kent's Second XI in 1990 before making his first-class cricket debut for the county in May 1991. He played five times for Kent's First XI in 1991 and 1992 before moving to Surrey ahead of the 1993 season. With Alec Stewart often on international duty, he found himself as the first choice wicket-keeper, making 49 first-class and 29 List A appearances for the county. He was Surrey's Player of the Year in 1995 and was awarded his county cap at the end of the 1996 season.

During the 1996–97 English winter Kersey played Sydney Grade Cricket for Western Suburbs District Cricket Club in Australia. He was involved in a road traffic accident near Kingaroy on 24 December 1996 and died on 1 January 1997. He was 25. Stewart, speaking after Kersey's death, described him as "without doubt, the most popular man on the staff; a true players' player".
