= St Thomas More Catholic School, Eltham =

St Thomas More Catholic School

Location
- Footscray Road; Eltham, Greater London, SE9 2SU; England; 51.44826°N 0.06155°E

Information
- Type: Academy
- Motto: "The King's Good Servant, But God's First"
- Religious affiliation: Roman Catholic
- Established: 1964
- Local authority: Greenwich
- Department for Education URN: 141716 Tables
- Ofsted: Reports
- Head Teacher: Stuart Sharp
- Gender: Mixed
- Age: 11 to 16
- Houses: Line; Stone; Mayne; Campion
- Website: stmcomprehensive.org

St Thomas More Catholic School is a mixed Roman Catholic secondary school, located in the Eltham area of the Royal Borough of Greenwich in London, England.

The school was first established in 1964, and is supported by the Roman Catholic Archdiocese of Southwark. Previously a voluntary aided school administered by Greenwich London Borough Council, St Thomas More Catholic School converted to academy status in February 2015. However the school continues to coordinate with Greenwich London Borough Council for admissions.

St Thomas More Catholic School offers GCSEs, BTECs and NVQs as programmes of study for pupils. Some courses are delivered in partnership with other schools in Greenwich.

In 2023 the school was found to have a number of potentially structurally unsound buildings due to the use of reinforced autoclaved aerated concrete as a building material.

== Notable former pupils ==
- Jimmy Mizen (1992-2008) - schoolboy, murder victim
- Teresa Pearce (b. 1955) - Labour Party politician, Member of Parliament (MP) for Erith and Thamesmead (2010-2019)
