= Leigh Academy Bexley =

Location
- Avenue Road; Erith, Greater London, DA8 3BN; England; 51°28′27″N 0°09′58″E

Information
- Type: Bilateral Academy
- Established: 1967
- Trust: Leigh Academies Trust
- Department for Education URN: 149898 Tables
- Ofsted: Reports
- Principal: John Dixon
- Gender: Coeducational
- Age: 11 to 18
- Enrolment: 1,537 as of May 2023
- Website: https://leighacademybexley.org.uk/

Leigh Academy Bexley (formerly Erith Grammar School, Erith School and then King Henry School) is a coeducational bilateral secondary school and sixth form in Erith in the London Borough of Bexley for students aged 11 to 18.

It is located just off the A220, Bexley Road.

== History ==
The predecessor to the current school was founded in the 1890s. Erith School was founded in 1967 via the merger of Northumberland Heath Secondary Modern School and Erith Grammar School. Initially, Erith School was a ten-form entry school catering for students of all abilities. In 1972, it became a bilateral school, the only one in the London Borough of Bexley.

Between 1967 and 1997, the school was situated on two sites. The East Building, on Avenue Road, was the old Erith Grammar School, with buildings dating from the 1950s. The West Building, on Brook Street, was built in the 1930s and was the site of the Northumberland Heath Secondary Modern School.

In 1979, a "hands off Erith School" campaign successfully allowed the school to retain its status, following the announcement of plans by Bexley Council to either close the school or divide it.

Building work started in the spring of 1994 on a new, refurbished £6.5 million single-site school on the Avenue Road site, and was completed by December 1996. It was opened in January 1997, with a new teaching block, sports hall and all-weather astroturf facilities. The old West Building on Brook Street now houses Northumberland Heath Primary School.

The school was awarded Specialist School status in 2005, recognising its excellence in PE, Maths and ICT. This was announced in a formal opening by Trevor Brooking. A new Sixth Form block, the David Friend Building, opened in May 2007. Its Community Sports Centre oversees usage during the evenings and weekends by a variety of teams.

In October 2010 the school became an Academy.

In June 2018, the school was featured in the BBC documentary Grammar Schools: Who Will Get In?.

In September 2018, the school changed its name to King Henry School after joining Townley Grammar School to form a multi-academy trust, the Odyssey Trust for Education.

In September 2022 King Henry School started working with the Leigh Academies Trust to help address the issues listed within the Ofsted inspection report received earlier that year.

In February 2023, it was announced the school would be renamed again to Leigh Academy Bexley, under the management of the Leigh Academies Trust. The school was formally renamed and became part of Leigh Academies Trust in June 2023.

== Notable alumni ==
- Jimmy Bullard (born 1978), footballer
- David Conner (born 1947), Anglican bishop and Dean of Windsor
- Peter Denyer (1947-2009), actor
- Alan Knott (born 1946), professional cricketer (Kent, England)
- Felicity Palmer (born 1944), mezzo-soprano opera singer, professor at the Royal College of Music
- Keith Peacock (born 1945), professional footballer (Charlton Athletic) and manager

== See also ==
- Beths Grammar School - former Bexley and Erith Technical High School
