= Felicity Palmer =

English mezzo-soprano and music professor (born 1944)

Dame Felicity Joan Palmer, DBE (born 6 April 1944), is an English mezzo-soprano and music professor. She sang soprano roles until 1983.

Palmer was born in Cheltenham and educated at Erith Grammar School, now named Erith School. She studied at the Guildhall School of Music and Drama in London and under Marianne Schech's guidance at the Munich College for Music and Theatre. In April 1970, she won first prize in the Kathleen Ferrier Memorial Scholarship. She made her operatic debut in 1971 as Dido in Dido and Aeneas with the Kent Opera. In 1973, she made her US debut with the Houston Grand Opera and her Metropolitan Opera debut was in 2000 as Waltraute (Götterdämmerung). Having made her debut with English National Opera (ENO) in 1975, her performance with the company forty years later, as the Countess in The Queen of Spades, was widely applauded and described as 'mesmerising' and 'astonishing'.

Palmer has performed and recorded Gilbert and Sullivan operas, as Katisha in The Mikado for the ENO and the Welsh National Opera (WNO), Dame Carruthers in The Yeomen of the Guard (WNO) and Little Buttercup in H.M.S. Pinafore (WNO). In 1998, she played Widow Begbick in the Lyric Opera of Chicago production of The Rise and Fall of the City of Mahagonny. In 2003, she performed the role of Mrs Lovett in Stephen Sondheim's Sweeney Todd at the Royal Opera House (the only musical the ROH has ever presented). She sang Venus in a 1983 BBC television broadcast of Orphée aux Enfers conducted by Alexander Faris.

Palmer is noted for her interpretation of the role of Madame de Croissy in Poulenc's Dialogues of the Carmelites, which she has sung at the Metropolitan Opera and at the Lyric Opera of Chicago's first ever production of the work. She also sang the role in English with the ENO and recorded it as part of the Chandos "Opera in English" series. Her other commercial recordings include Der fliegende Holländer and 'Love's Old Sweet Song, Victorian and Edwardian Ballads', 1978, The Decca Recording Company:1997, L.P.;Belart, C.D., (a Polygram Company), 0 28946 14902 7:( John Constable on piano).

Her work in contemporary music has included the first Glyndebourne production of Péter Eötvös's opera Love and Other Demons, in the role of Josefa Miranda.

Palmer is a professor at the Royal College of Music in London. She was appointed Commander of the Order of the British Empire (CBE) in 1993 and Dame Commander of the Order of the British Empire (DBE) in the 2011 New Year Honours for services to music.

She is a first cousin of Barclay Palmer, Olympic athlete and humanities educator and reformer.
