= John Gosling (cricketer, born 1833) =

English cricketer

Personal information
- Full name: John Frederick Gosling
- Born: 19 February 1833; North Cray, Kent
- Died: 16 October 1882 (aged 49); Bream, Gloucestershire

Domestic team information
- Years: Team
- 1858: Kent

Career statistics
Competition	First-class
Matches	1
Runs scored	2
Batting average	1.00
100s/50s	0/0
Top score	2
Catches/stumpings	0/–
- Source: Cricinfo, 21 August 2012

John Frederick Gosling (19 February 1833 – 16 October 1882) was an English cricketer who made a single first-class cricket appearance for Kent County Cricket Club in 1858. He was born at North Cray in Kent, and educated at Rugby School.

Gosling made his only appearance for Kent against England in 1858 at the St Lawrence Ground in Canterbury. He died at Bream, Gloucestershire in October 1882 aged 49.

== Bibliography ==
- Carlaw, Derek (2020). Kent County Cricketers, A to Z: Part One (1806–1914) (PDF). Cardiff: ACS.
