= Bexley railway station =

National Rail station in London, England

Bexley
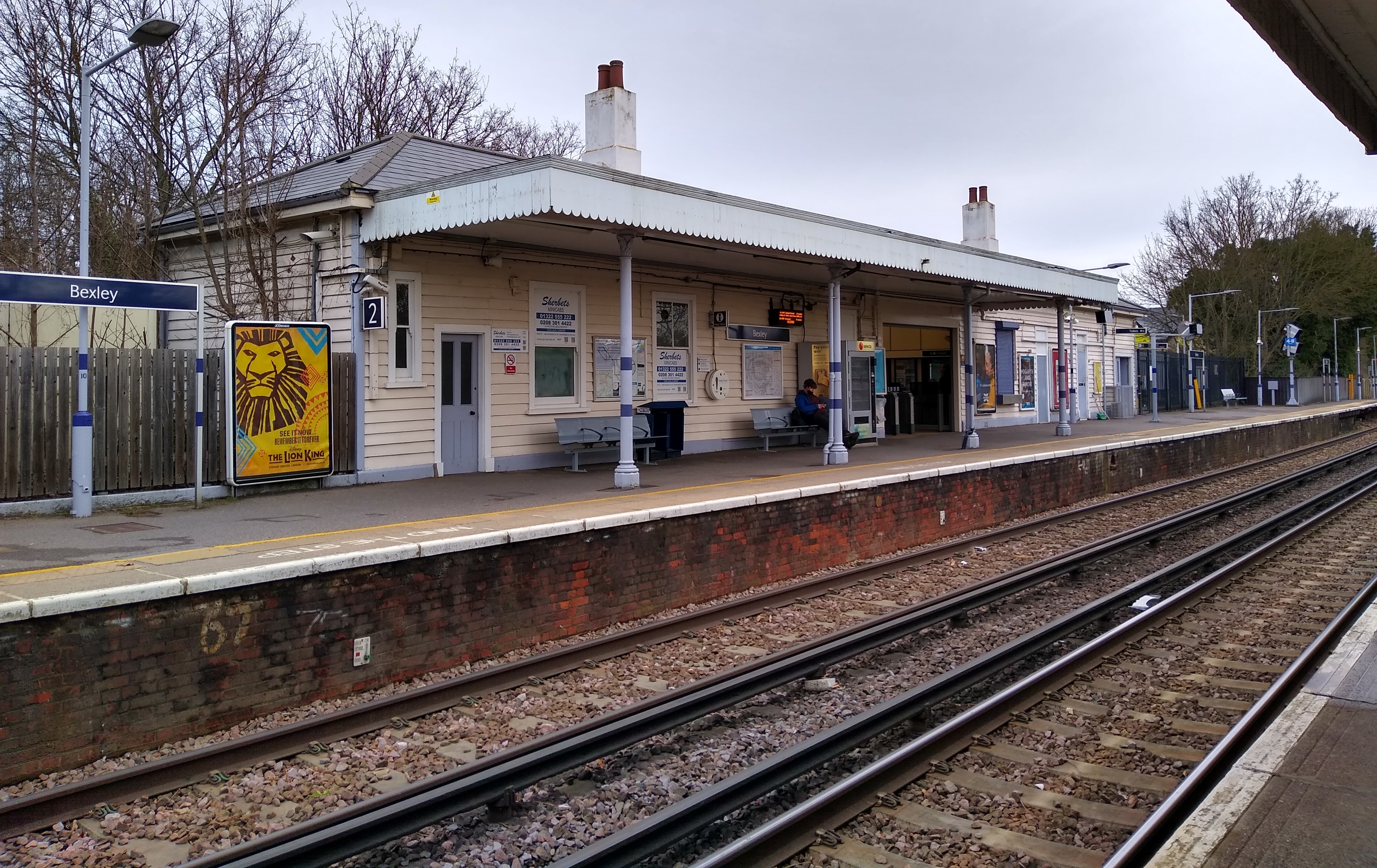
- Interactive map of Bexley

General information
- Location: Bexley
- Local authority: London Borough of Bexley
- Managed by: Southeastern
- Station code: BXY
- DfT category: D
- Number of platforms: 2
- Fare zone: 6

National Rail annual entry and exit
- 2020–21: ▼0.303 million
- 2021–22: ▲0.768 million
- 2022–23: ▲0.954 million
- 2023–24: ▲1.045 million
- 2024–25: ▲1.097 million

Key dates
- 1 September 1866: Opened

Other information
- External links: Departures; Facilities
- Coordinates: 51.4403°N 0.1479°E

Bexley railway station is in the London Borough of Bexley in south-east London, in London fare zone 6. It is 13 miles 69 chains (22.3 km) down the line from London Charing Cross. The station, and all trains serving it, is operated by Southeastern.

Trains from the station run eastbound to Dartford and Gravesend and westbound to London Charing Cross via Lewisham.

It was the scene of the Bexley derailment in 1997 when a freight train derailed very near the station.

== History ==
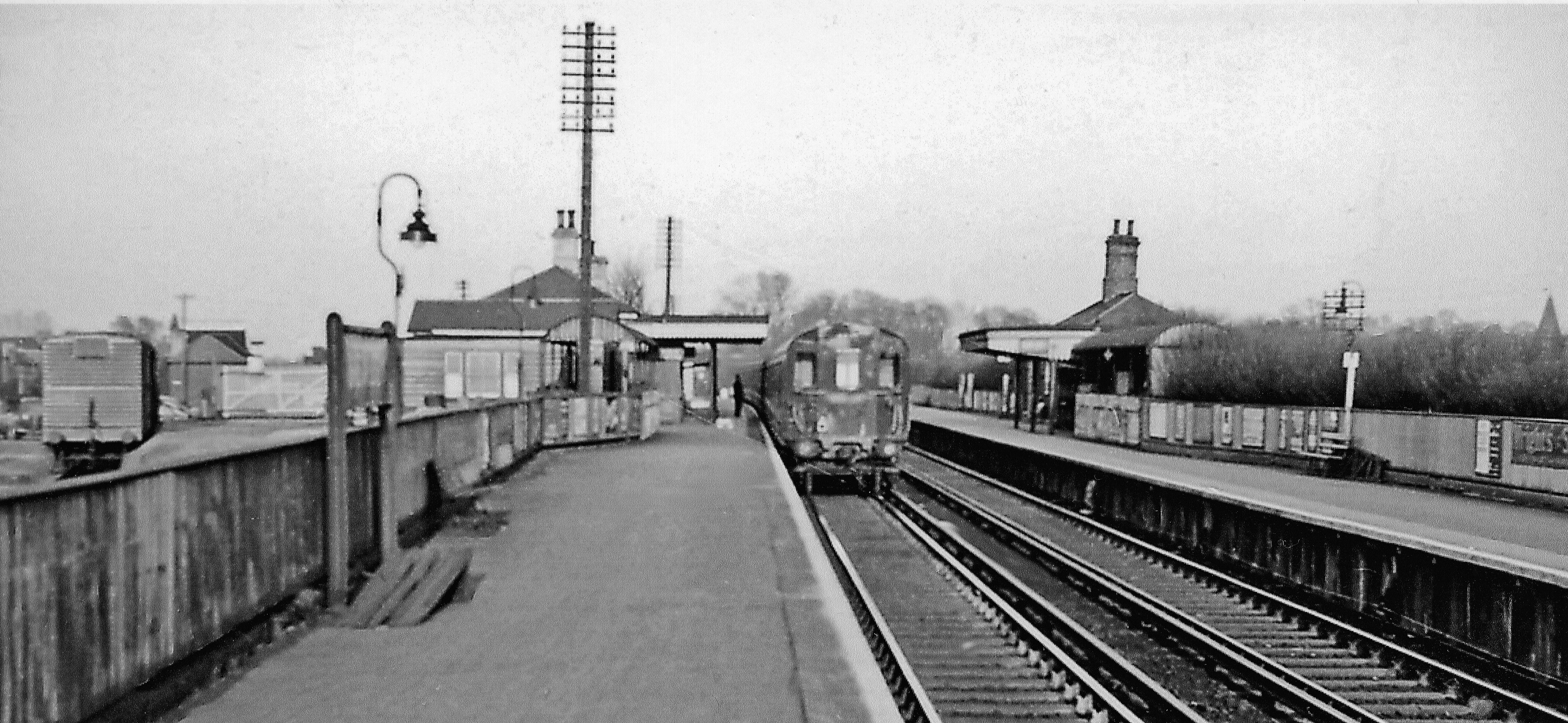
Bexley Station in 1961

Bexley station was opened in September 1866. It had five sidings on the down side, to the west of the station building with a row of coal stacks. Farm produce formed much of the goods traffic in the station's early years, much of it grown in local fields. The station had an SER-designed two-storey timber signal box which came into use about twenty years after the station opened. In 1955 the platforms were extended to accommodate ten carriage trains. The goods sidings closed in 1963 and the signal box closed in 1970. The clapboard buildings of the original station are well preserved.

The station will have a new footbridge and lifts added during 2023

=== Bexley derailment ===
The Bexley derailment was an accident which occurred on 4 February 1997 when an eastbound EWS freight train derailed near to Bexley station on the Dartford Loop Line. Railtrack plc, SEIMCL and STRCL were each convicted of various offences under section 3 of the Health and Safety at Work etc. Act 1974 resulting in fines totalling £150,000 and £41,768. In his sentencing remarks, the judge said that it "was merciful that nobody was killed although four people were injured". The Inspectorate report describes it as "fortunate" that nobody was killed. The primary cause of the accident was found to be very poor track maintenance, contributed to by an overloaded wagon.

== Location ==
Bexley station is at the heart of Bexley Town centre (known as Bexley Village).

== Facilities ==
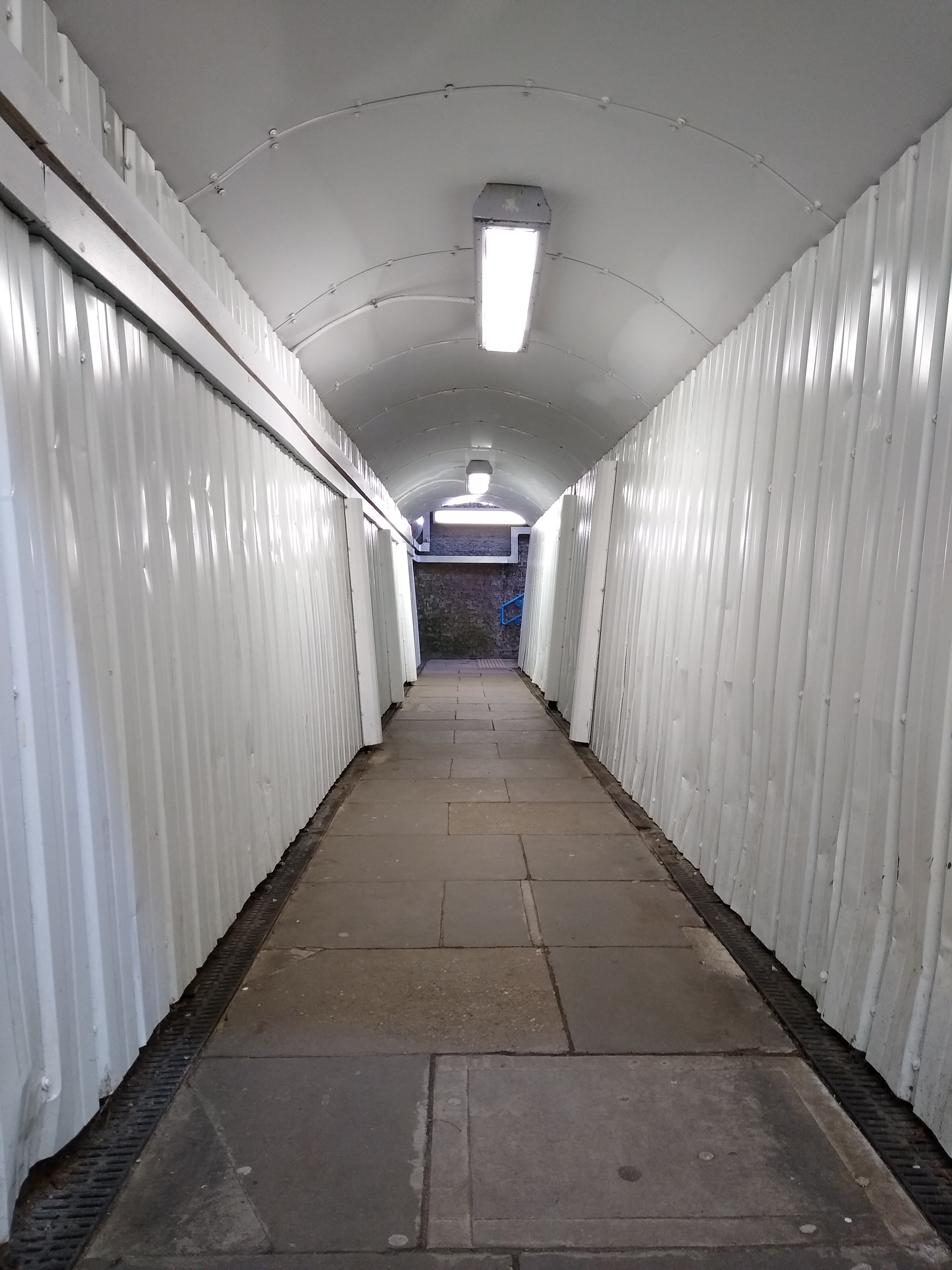
The subway between the two platforms

A subway links the two platforms. The station has ticket gates. There is a 259-space car park.

== Services ==
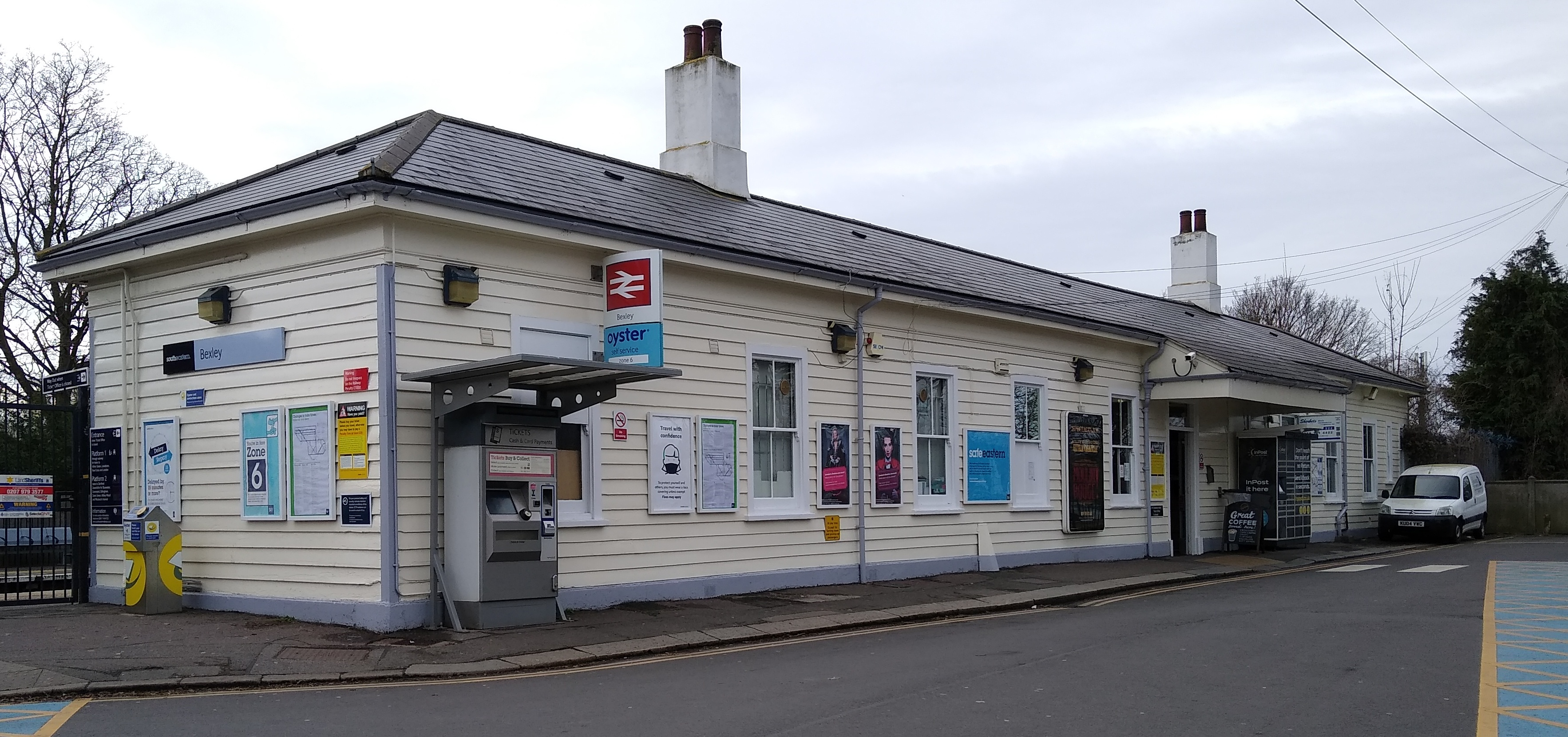
Station building of Bexley

All services at Bexley are operated by Southeastern using Class 376, 465, 466 and 707 EMUs.

The typical off-peak service in trains per hour is:

- 4 tph to London Charing Cross (2 of these run direct and 2 run via Lewisham)
- 4 tph to Dartford of which 2 continue to Gravesend

Additional services, including trains to and from London Cannon Street via either Lewisham, or via Woolwich Arsenal and Greenwich, and to London Blackfriars call at the station during the peak hours.

Preceding station	National Rail	Following station
Albany Park	Southeastern Dartford Loop Line	Crayford

== Connections ==
London Buses routes 132 and 229 and night route N21 serve the station.
