= Joshua Trimmer =

British geologist (1795–1857)

Joshua Trimmer (11 July 1795 – 16 September 1857) was an English geologist born at North Cray in Kent. He was the son of Joshua Kirby Trimmer of Brentford, and grandson of Sarah Trimmer (1741–1810), author of the Story of the Robins (1786).

== Life ==
At the age of nineteen he was sent to North Wales to manage a copper mine for his father; subsequently he was placed in charge of a farm in Middlesex, where he acquired a knowledge of and an interest in soils; in 1825 he became manager (for his father) of slate quarries near Bangor and Carnarvon, and in this district he remained for many years. He discovered the marine shells in the drift of Moel Tryfaen. During the years 1850 to 1854 he was engaged on the Geological Survey, and surveyed parts of the New Forest in Hampshire. He died in London.

He published memoirs on the Origin of the Soils which cover the Chalk of Kent; On the Geology of Norfolk, as Illustrating the Laws of the Distribution of Soils (1847); and Proposals for a Geological Survey, specially directed to Agricultural Objects (1850); in this respect he was a pioneer in agricultural geology. He was also the author of another useful work Practical Geology and Mineralogy (1841).
