= Bexley =

Area of Greater London, England

Coordinates: 51.441°N 0.149°E

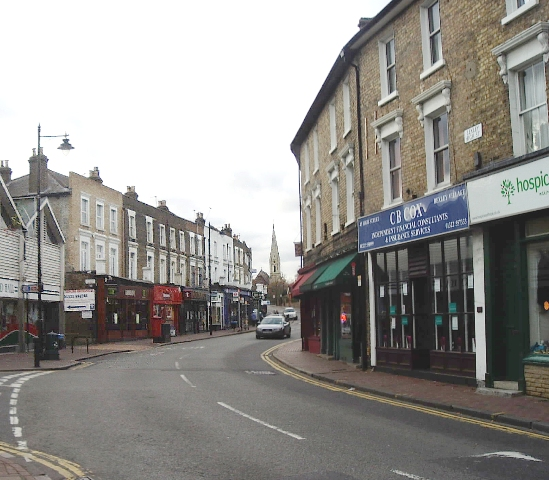
- Bexley High Street

- Location within Greater London
- OS grid reference: TQ465755
- London borough: Bexley
- Ceremonial county: Greater London
- Region: London
- Country: England
- Sovereign state: United Kingdom
- Post town: BEXLEY
- Postcode district: DA5
- Dialling code: 020; 01322
- Police: Metropolitan
- Fire: London
- Ambulance: London
- UK Parliament: Old Bexley and Sidcup
- London Assembly: Bexley and Bromley

Bexley is an area of south-eastern Greater London, England and part of the London Borough of Bexley. It is sometimes known as Bexley Village or Old Bexley to differentiate the area from the wider borough. It is located 13 miles (21 km) east-southeast of Charing Cross and south of Bexleyheath.

Bexley was an ancient parish in the county of Kent. As part of the suburban growth of London in the 20th century, Bexley increased in population, becoming a municipal borough in 1935 and has formed part of Greater London since 1965.

== History ==
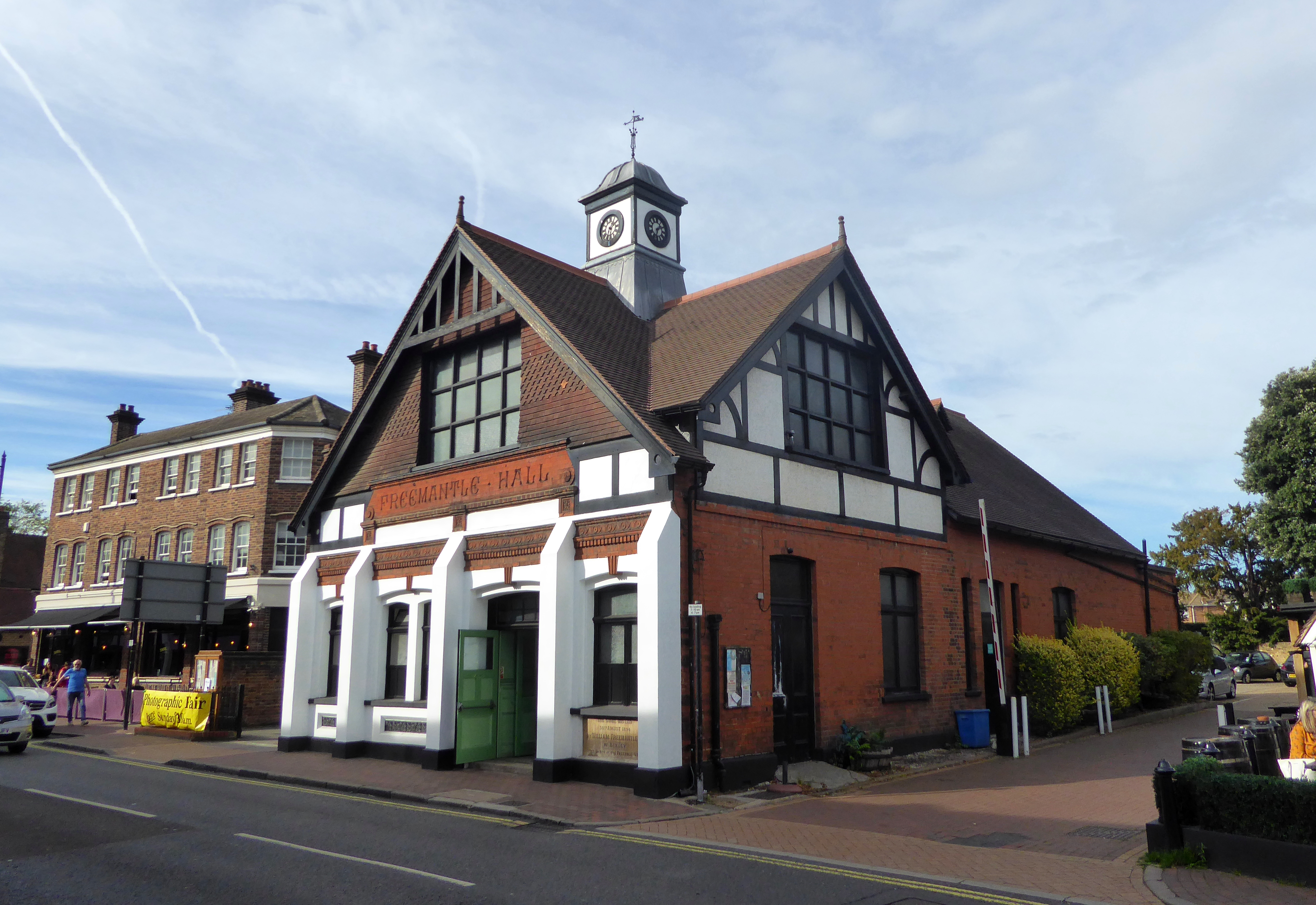
The Victorian Freemantle Hall, Bexley

The name Bexley derives from the Old English byxelēah meaning 'boxtree wood or clearing'.

Bexley was an ancient parish in Kent, in the Diocese of Rochester, and under the Local Government Act 1894 formed part of Bexley Urban District. The urban district gained further status in 1935 as a municipal borough. Kent County Council formed the second tier of local government during that time. In 1965, London County Council was abolished and replaced by Greater London Council, with an expanded administrative area that took in the metropolitan parts of the Home Counties. Bexley Municipal Borough, Erith Municipal Borough, Crayford Urban District Council and Chislehurst & Sidcup Urban District Council were merged (less areas of Chislehurst and Sidcup that became part of the new London Borough of Bromley) into a new London Borough of Bexley.

== Geography and landmarks ==
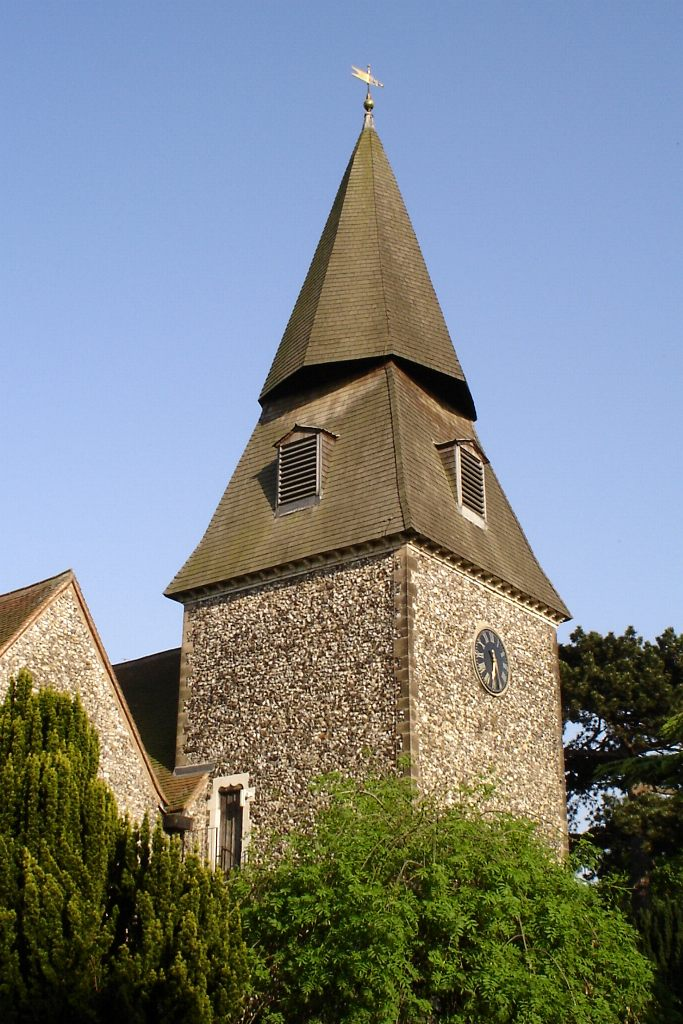
St. Mary's Church spire

Bexley's main landmark is the Anglican church of St. Mary which lends its name to the London Borough of Bexley electoral ward containing the village. The ancient church's most distinctive exterior feature undoubtedly is its unusual spire which resembles an octagonal cone balancing on top of a truncated pyramid. Originally built in the Middle Ages, its monastic-style interior survived from the Reformation until the 18th century, before refurbishment in Victorian times. Among others, the German-born scientist Henry Oldenburg was buried in the churchyard in 1677.

Hall Place, a former stately home beside the River Cray on the Bourne Road out of Bexley towards Crayford, is where the Austen baronets lived. It lies to the north of Bexley at the foot of the road (Gravel Hill) up onto Bexley Heath (now covered in the modern day town of Bexleyheath). The house is unusual in that its two halves are built in highly contrasting architectural styles with little attempt at harmonising them. The house and grounds are now owned by the London Borough of Bexley, and are open to the public. The gardens include a topiary display of traditional heraldic figures. Three walking routes pass Hall Place, the local council-sponsored Shuttle River Way and Cray River Way and the Mayor of London's "London LOOP" walk, which, shortly after its start at Erith, follows the Cray River Way from Crayford to Foots Cray.

Danson House and the surrounding Danson Park in Welling are two of the main popular attractions in the London Borough of Bexley. The Shaw family, celebrated 19th-century architects came from Bexley: John Shaw (1776–1832) worked on Lamorbey Park and was a well-known architect in Kent and Middlesex, being one of the first designers of semi-detached housing in the capital. He is buried at St. Mary's Church; his son, John Shaw Jr, lived in nearby Crayford for a short time and owned a villa which was demolished in the early 20th century.

== Places of worship ==
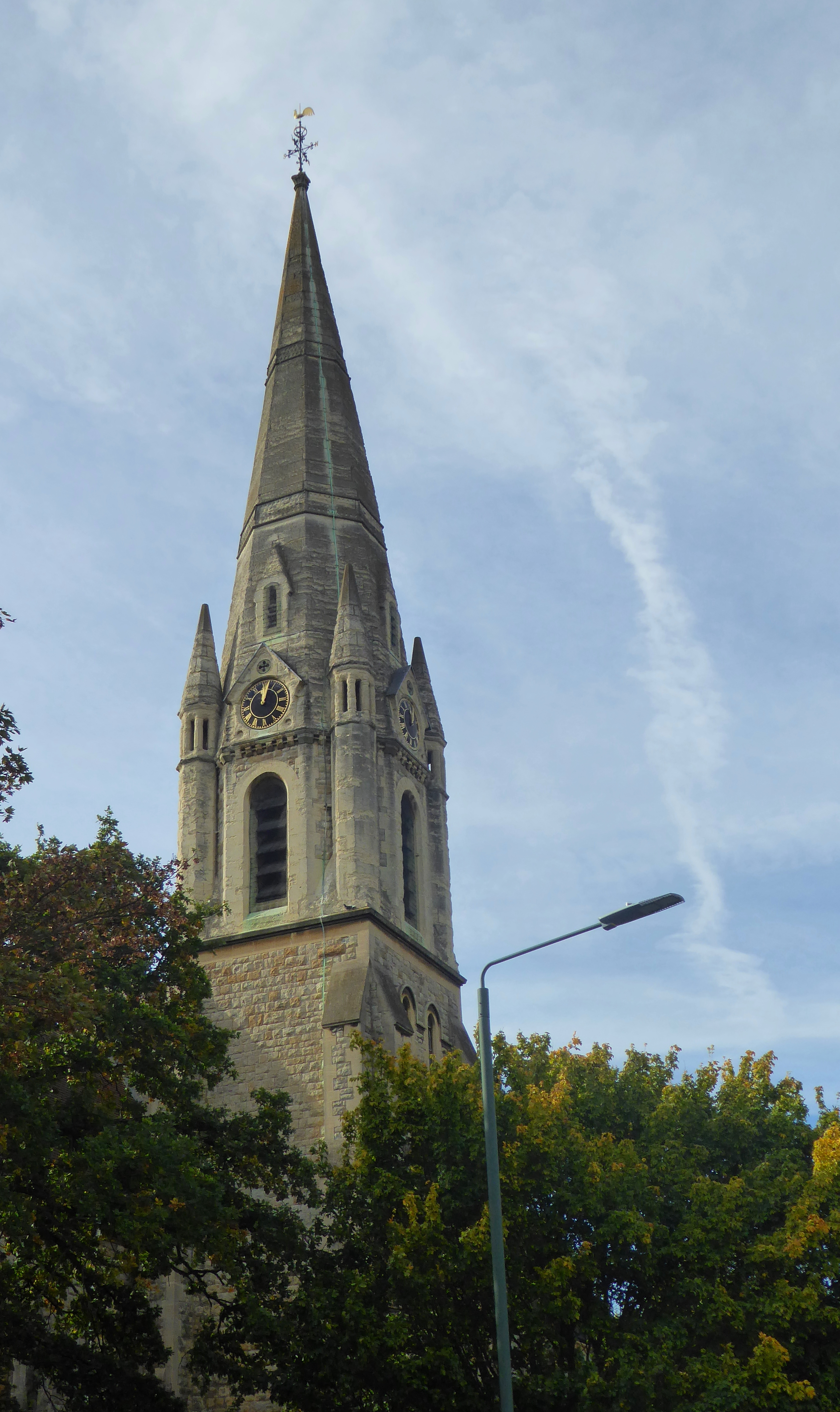
St John the Evangelist, late 19c neo-gothic design

- St. Mary the Virgin Church, Bexley
- Albany Park Baptist Church, Stansted Crescent
- St. Augustine's Church, Slade Green Road
- St. John the Evangelist, Parkhill Road
- Strict Baptist Chapel, Bourne Road
- United Reformed Church, Hurst Road
- Our Lady of Angels Church, Bexley Road
- St. Paulinus Church, Bexley

== Transport ==
Bexley railway station serves the area with services to London Charing Cross via Sidcup and to Gravesend. Bexley is served by several Transport for London bus services connecting it with areas including Abbey Wood, Bexleyheath, Bromley, Crayford, Chislehurst, Dartford, Eltham, Erith, North Greenwich, Sidcup, Thamesmead, and Welling.

== Culture ==
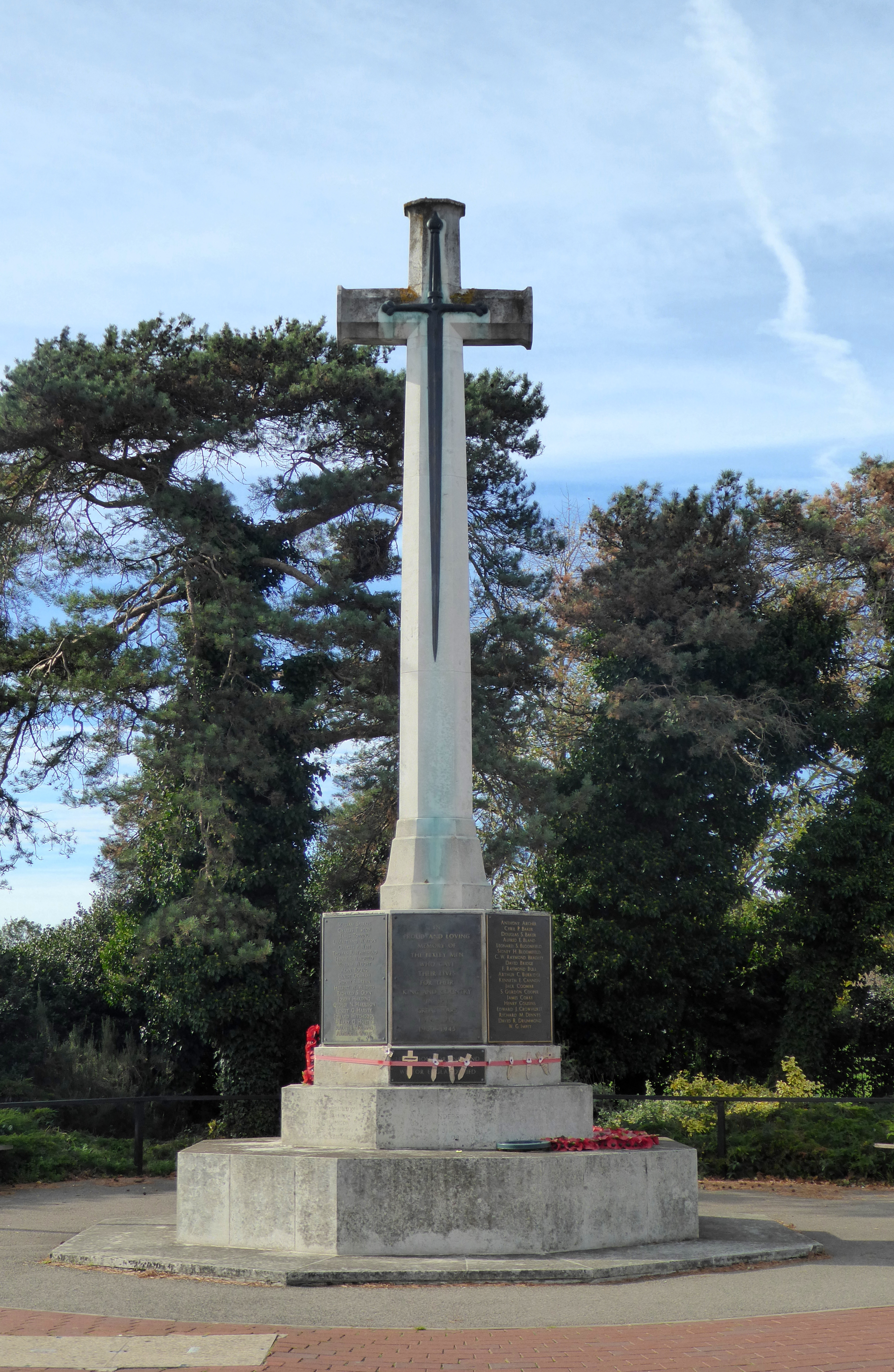
Bexley War Memorial with its Cross of Sacrifice

- Old Dartfordians' War Memorial clubhouse, Bourne Road (home to the DA5 Club). This is home to both Dartfordians' Rugby Club and Dartfordians' Cricket Club.
- Bexley Cricket Club is based on Manor Way.
- Burnt Ash (Bexley) Hockey Club are also based at Manor Way, and play their home matches here, at Hurstmere School or at Erith School.

== Twin towns and sister cities ==
Bexley is twinned with:

- Arnsberg, North Rhine-Westphalia, Germany
- Évry, Île-de-France, France
- Footscray, Melbourne, Australia

== See also ==
- List of people from the London Borough of Bexley
- List of schools in Bexley
