= History of water supply and sanitation =

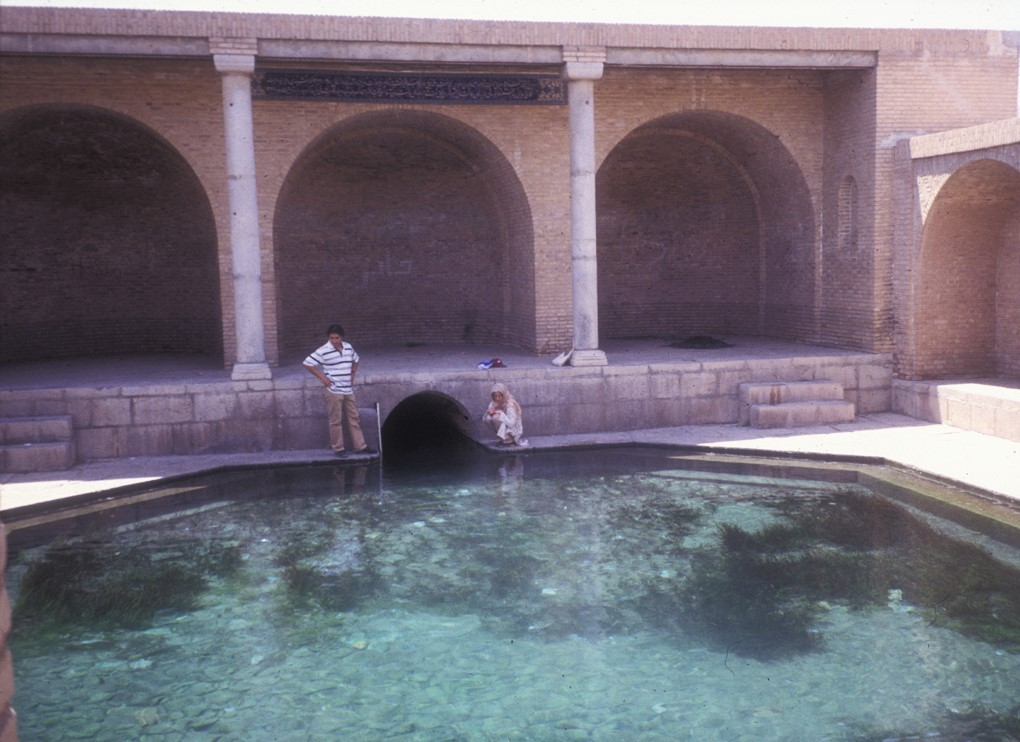
Qanat in Kashan surfacing within the Fin Garden; it is thought to have served Iran's Sialk area for thousands of years.

Ever since the emergence of sedentary societies (often precipitated by the development of agriculture), human settlements have had to contend with the closely-related logistical challenges of sanitation and of reliably obtaining clean water. Where water resources, infrastructure or sanitation systems were insufficient, diseases spread and people fell sick or died prematurely.

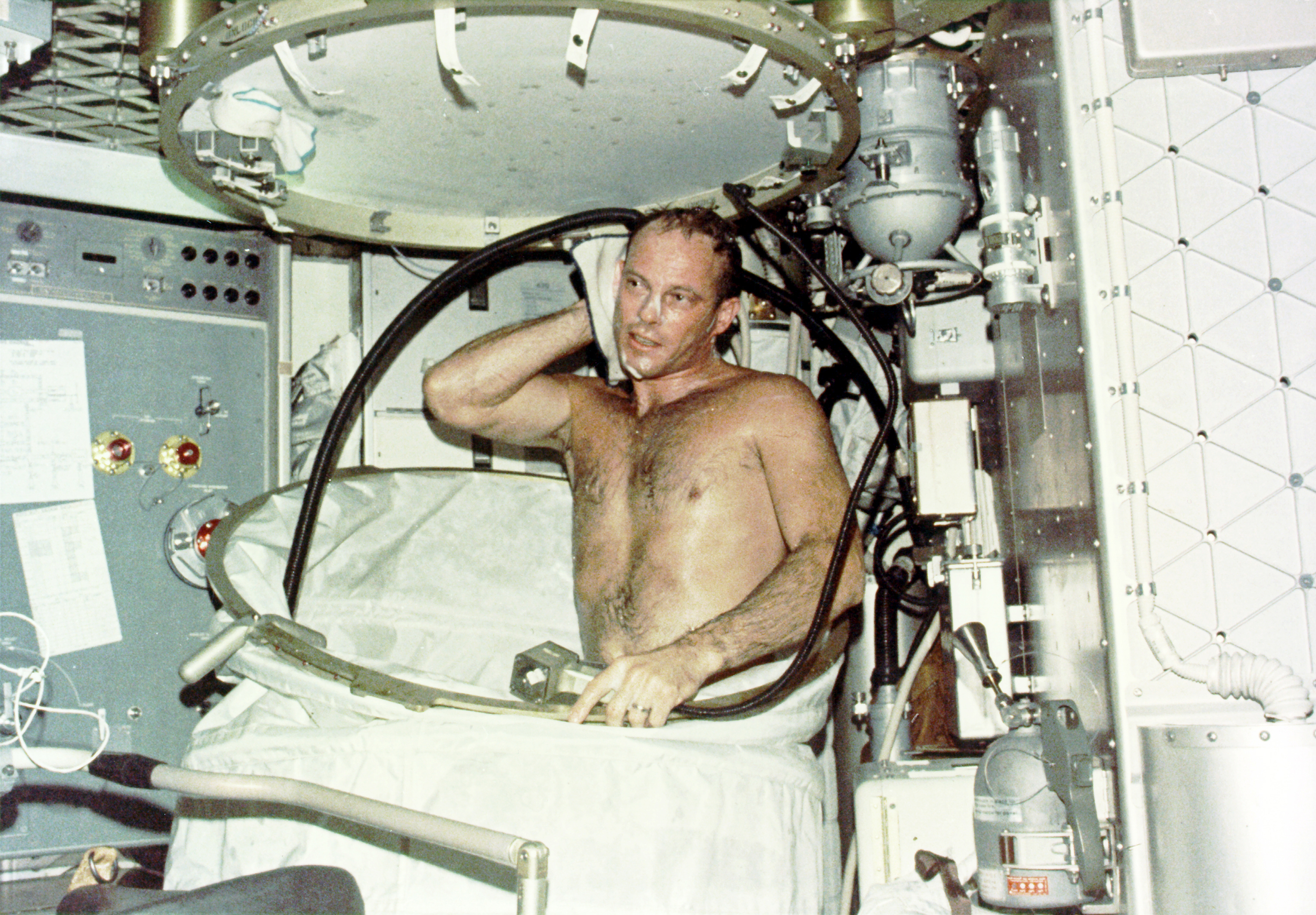
Astronaut Jack Lousma taking a shower in space, 1974

Major human settlements could initially develop only where fresh surface water was plentiful—for instance, in areas near rivers or natural springs. Over time, various societies devised a variety of systems which made it easier to obtain clean water or to dispose of (and, later, also treat) wastewater.

For much of this history, sewage treatment consisted in the conveyance of raw sewage to a natural body of water—such as a river or ocean—in which, after disposal, it would be diluted and eventually dissipate.

Over the course of millennia, technological advances have significantly increased the distances across which water can be practically transported. Similarly, treatment processes to purify drinking water and to treat wastewater have also improved.

== Prehistory ==
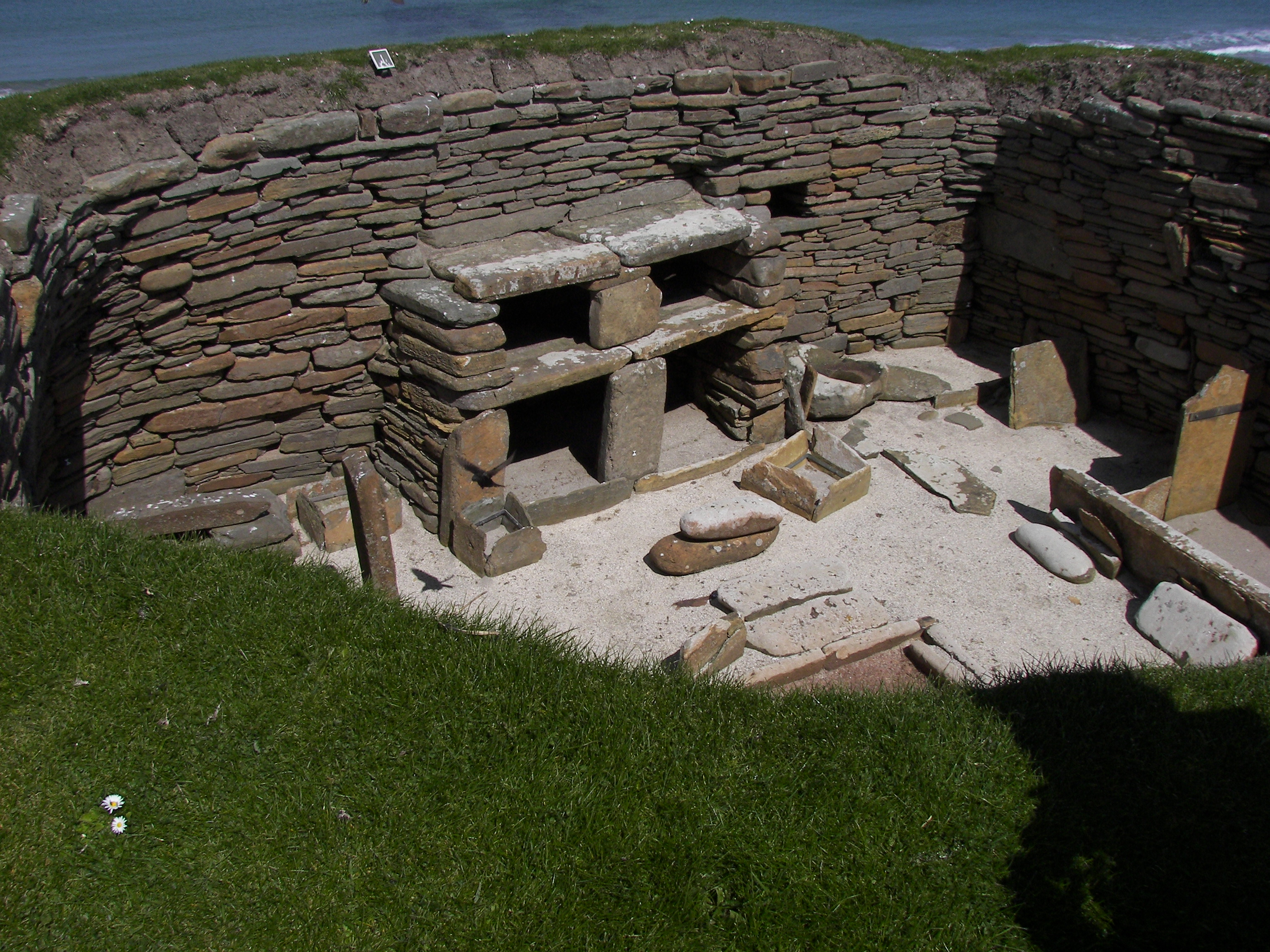
Skara Brae, a Neolithic village in Orkney, Scotland, with what might have been water-flushing toilets, 3180–2500 BCE

During the Neolithic era, humans dug the first permanent water wells, from where vessels could be filled and carried by hand. Wells dug around 8500 BCE have been found on Cyprus, and 6500 BCE in the Jezreel Valley. The size of human settlements was largely dependent on the amount of water available nearby.

A primitive indoor fresh- and wastewater system, consisting of two stone channels lined with tree bark, appears to have featured in the houses of Skara Brae and the Barnhouse Settlement in Orkney from around 3000 BCE Combined with a cell-like enclave in a number of houses at Skara Brae, it has been suggested that these may have functioned as an early indoor latrine.

=== Wastewater reuse activities ===
Waste water reuse is an ancient practice connected to the development of sanitation provision. Reuse of untreated municipal wastewater has been practiced for many centuries with the objective of diverting human waste outside of urban settlements. Likewise, land application of domestic wastewater is an old and common practice, which has gone through different stages of development.

Domestic wastewater was used for irrigation by ancient civilizations (e.g. Mesopotamian, Indus valley, and Minoan) since the Bronze Age (c. 3200 – c. 1100 BCE). Thereafter, wastewater was used for disposal, irrigation, and fertilization by Hellenic civilizations and later by Romans in areas surrounding cities (e.g. Athens and Rome).

== Bronze and early Iron Ages ==
=== Ancient Americas ===
In ancient Peru, the Nazca people employed a system of interconnected wells and an underground watercourse known as puquios.

The Mayans were the third earliest civilization to have employed a system of indoor plumbing using pressurized water.

=== Ancient Near East ===
==== Mesopotamia ====
The Mesopotamians introduced clay sewer pipes around 4000 BCE, with the earliest examples found in the Temple of Bel at Nippur and at Eshnunna, utilised to remove wastewater from sites, and capture rainwater, in wells. The city of Uruk also demonstrates the first examples of brick constructed latrines, from 3200 BCE. Clay pipes were later used in the Hittite city of Hattusa. They had easily detachable and replaceable segments, and allowed for cleaning.

==== Ancient Persia ====
The first sanitation systems within prehistoric Iran were built near the city of Zabol. Persian qanats and ab anbars have been used for water supply and cooling.

==== Ancient Egypt ====
The c. 2400 BCE, Pyramid of Sahure, and adjoining temple complex at Abusir, was discovered to have a network of copper drainage pipes.

=== Ancient East Asia ===
==== Ancient China ====
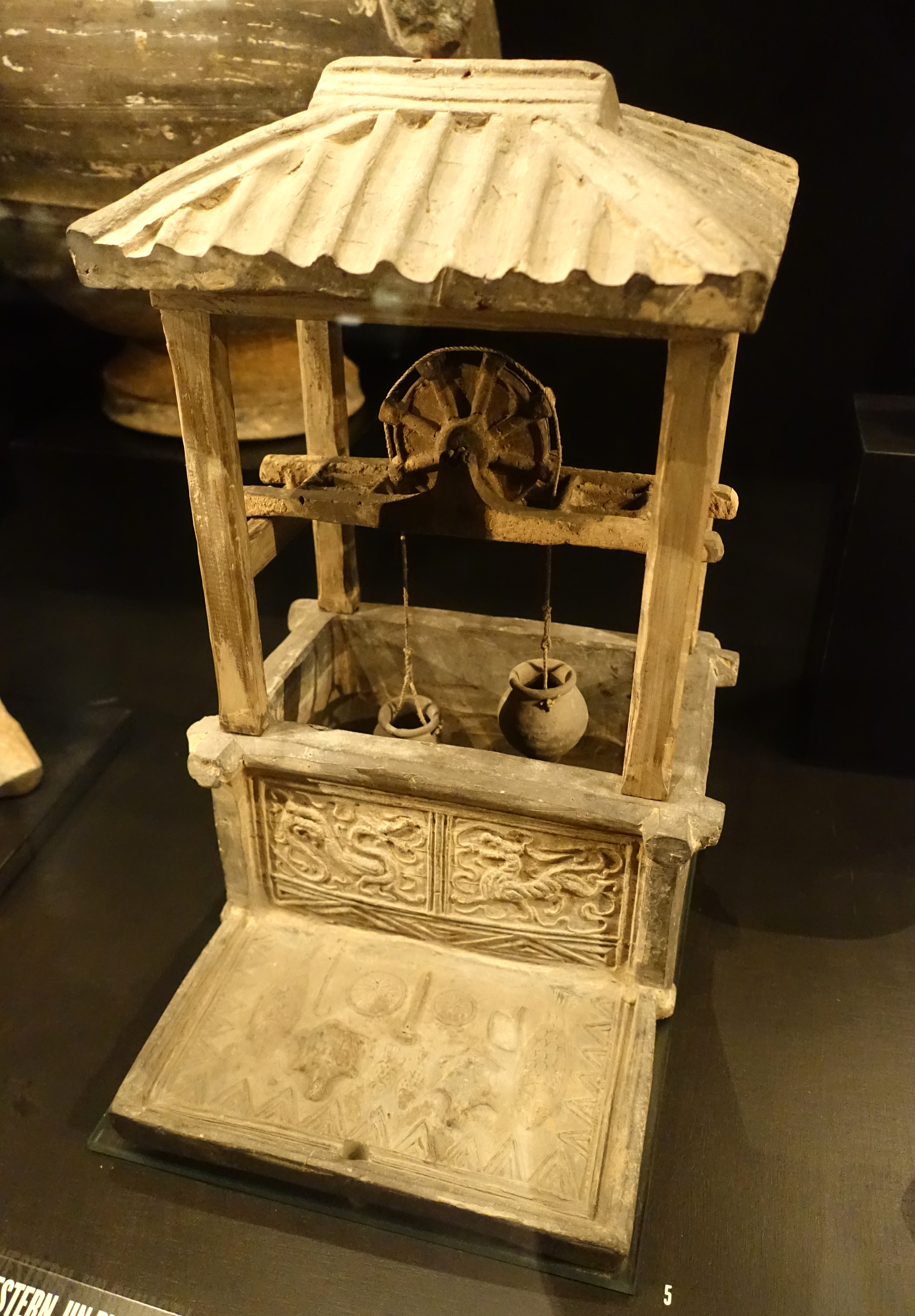
A Chinese ceramic model of a well with a water pulley system, excavated from a tomb of the Han Dynasty (202 BCE – 220 CE) period

Some of the earliest evidence of water wells are located in China. The Neolithic Chinese discovered and made extensive use of deep drilled groundwater for drinking. The Chinese text The Book of Changes, originally a divination text of the Western Zhou dynasty (1046–771 BCE), contains an entry describing how the ancient Chinese maintained their wells and protected their sources of water. Archaeological evidence and old Chinese documents reveal that the prehistoric and ancient Chinese had the aptitude and skills for digging deep water wells for drinking water as early as 6000 to 7000 years ago. A well excavated at the Hemedu excavation site was believed to have been built during the Neolithic era. The well was constructed with four rows of logs with a square frame attached to them at the top of the well. Sixty additional tile wells southwest of Beijing are also believed to have been built around 600 BCE for drinking and irrigation. Plumbing is also known to have been used in East Asia since the Qin and Han Dynasties of China.

=== Indus Valley Civilization ===
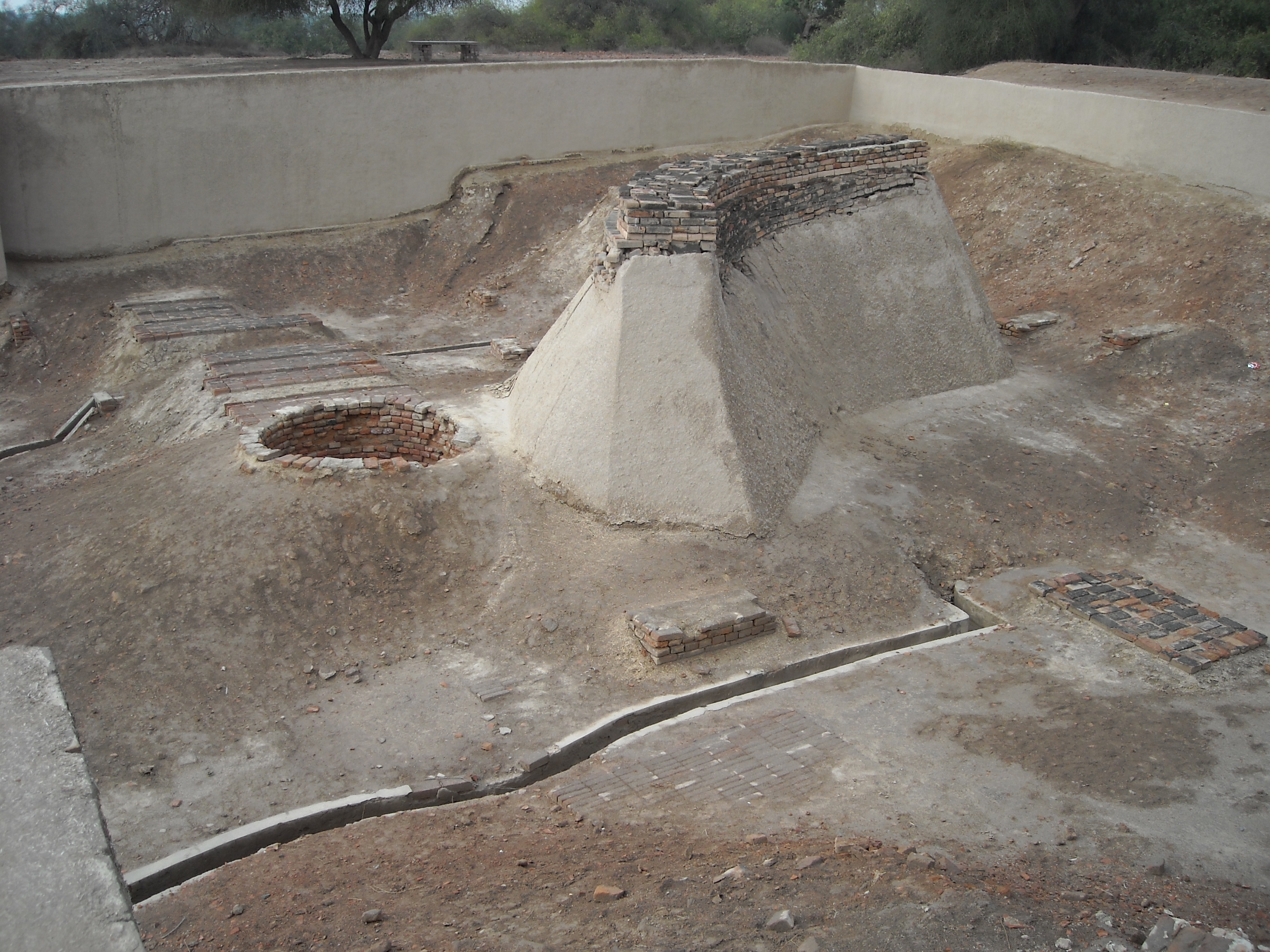
A large well and bathing platforms at Harappa, remains of the city's final phase of occupation from 2200 to 1900 BCE

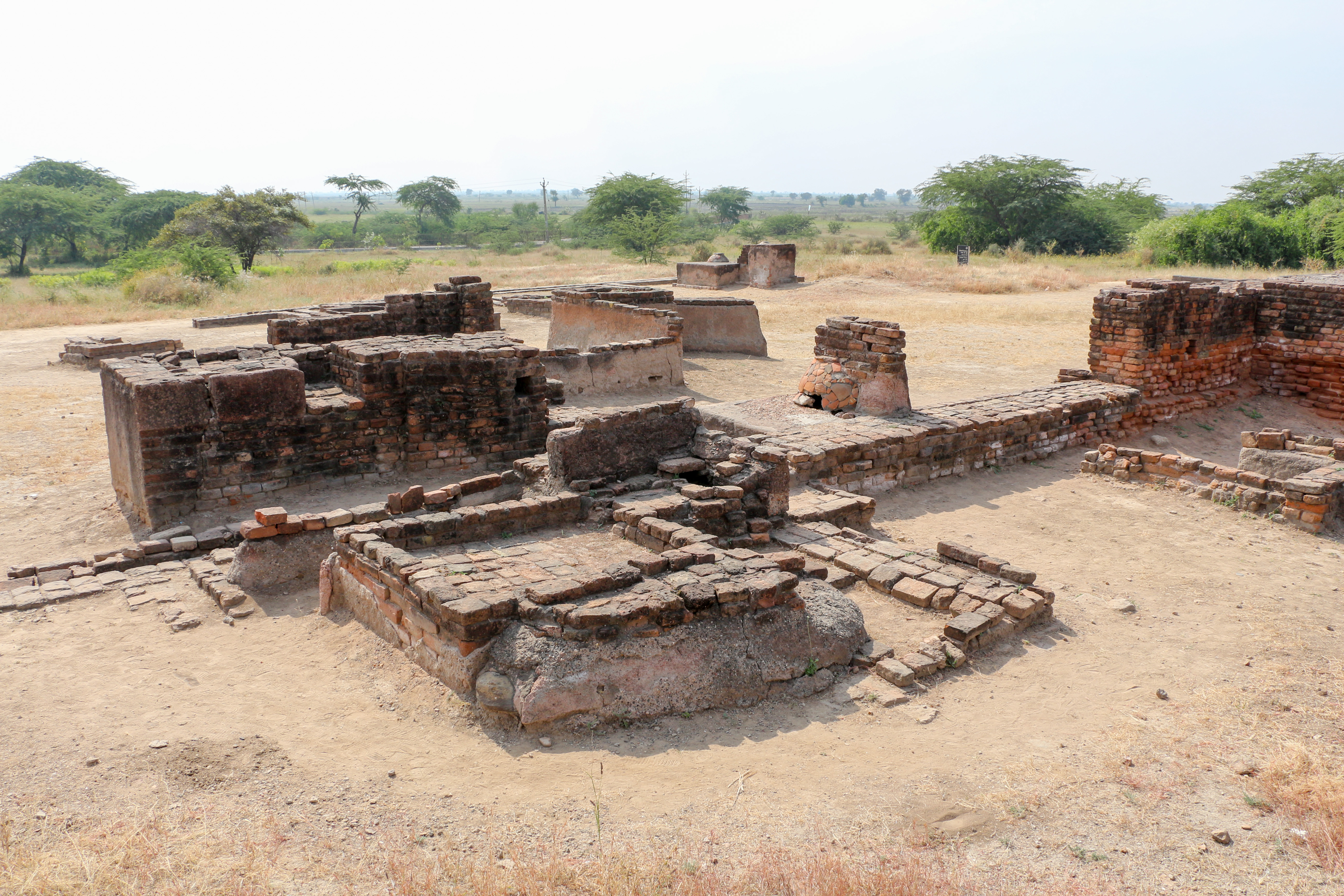
The bathroom-toilet structure of the ruler's house, on Lothal's acropolis c. 2350 BCE

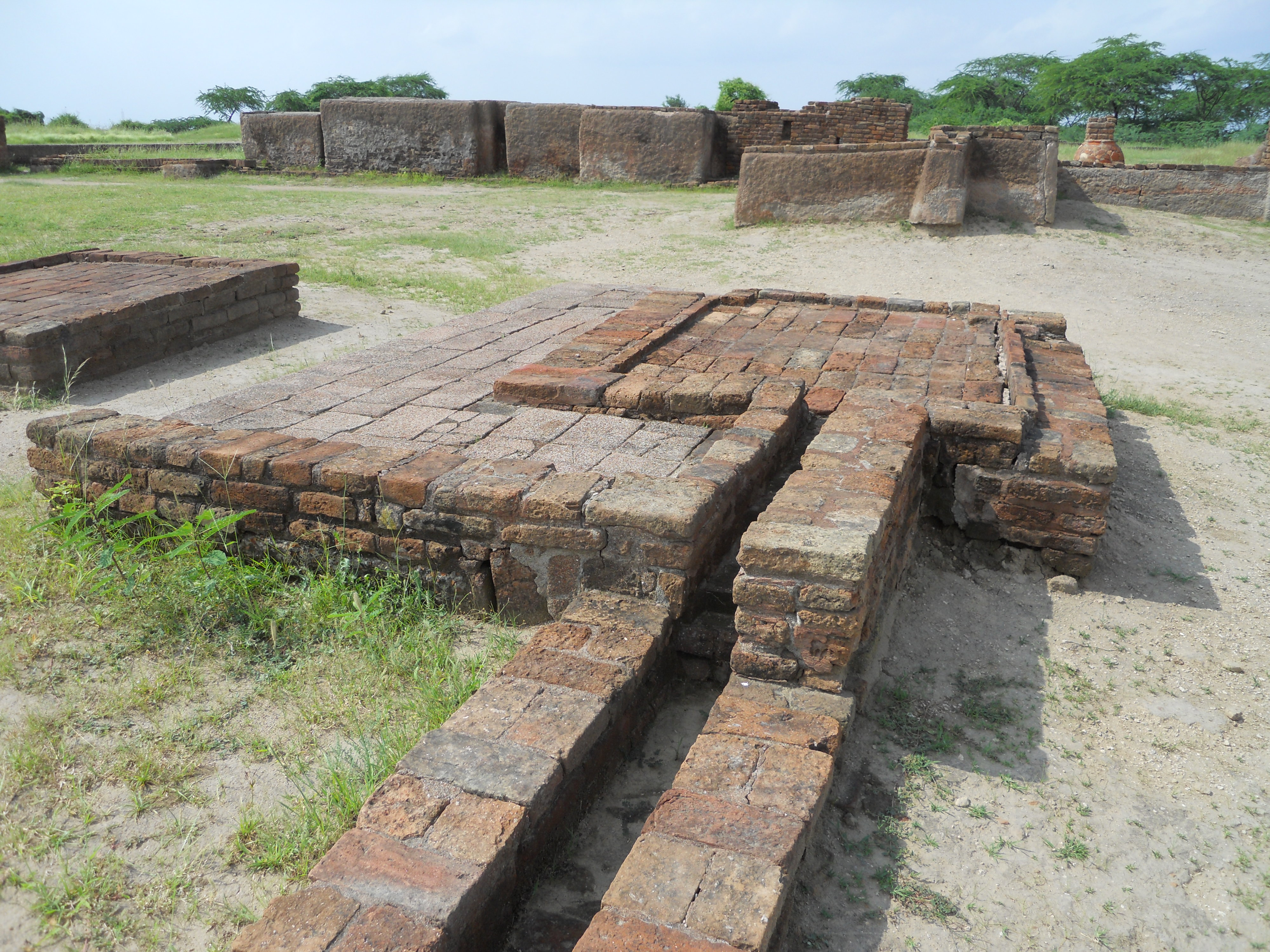
Bathing platform and communal drain, Lothal's acropolis, c. 2350 BCE

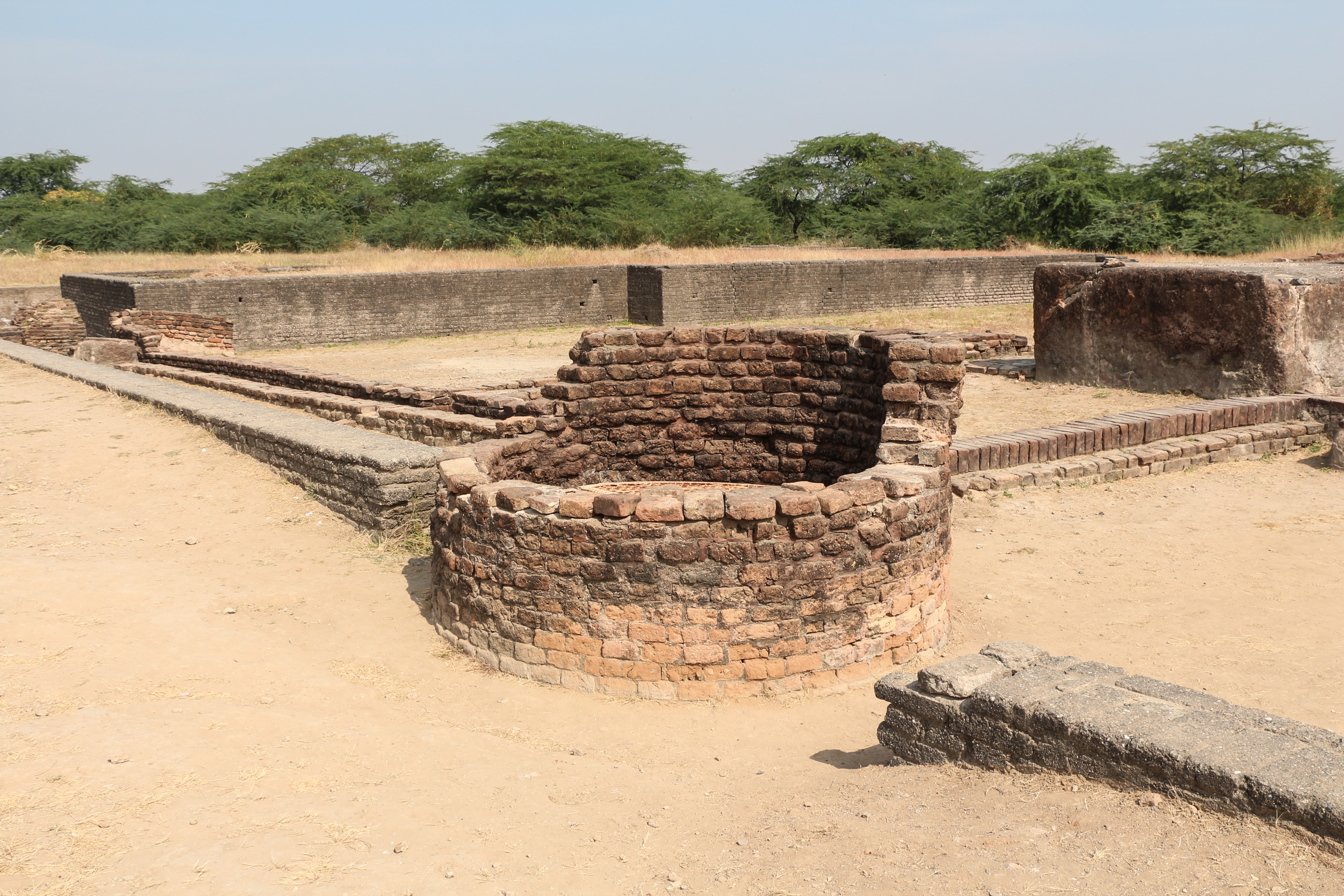
Well, and drain, Lothal's acropolis, c. 2350 BCE

The Indus Valley civilization in Asia shows early evidence of public water supply and sanitation. The system the Indus developed and managed included a number of advanced features. An exceptional example is the Indus city of Lothal (c. 2350 – c. 1810 BCE). In Lothal, the ruler's house had their own private bathing platform and latrine, which was connected to an open street drain that discharged into the town's dock. A number of the other houses of the acropolis had burnished brick bathing platforms, that drained into a covered brick sewer, held together with a gypsum-based mortar, that ran to a soak pit outside the towns walls, while the lower town offered soak jars (large buried urns, with a hole in the bottom to permit liquids to drain), the latter of which were regularly emptied and cleaned. Water was supplied from two wells in the town, one in the acropolis, and the other on the edge of the dock.

The urban areas of the Indus Valley civilization included public and private baths. Sewage was disposed through underground drains built with precisely laid bricks, and a sophisticated water management system with numerous reservoirs was established. In the drainage systems, drains from houses were connected to wider public drains. Many of the buildings at Mohenjo-daro had two or more stories. Water from the roof and upper story bathrooms was carried through enclosed terracotta pipes or open chutes that emptied out onto the street drains.

The earliest evidence of urban sanitation was seen in Harappa, Mohenjo-daro, and the recently discovered Rakhigarhi of Indus Valley civilization. This urban plan included the world's first urban sanitation systems. Within the city, individual homes or groups of homes obtained water from wells. From a room that appears to have been set aside for bathing, waste water was directed to covered drains, which lined the major streets.

Devices such as shadoofs were used to lift water to ground level. Ruins from the Indus Valley Civilization like Mohenjo-daro in Pakistan and Dholavira in Gujarat in India had settlements with some of the ancient world's most sophisticated sewage systems. They included drainage channels, rainwater harvesting, and street ducts.

Stepwells have mainly been used in the Indian subcontinent.

=== Southern Europe ===
==== Ancient Greece ====
The Minoan civilization of Crete built underground clay pipes for sanitation and water supply. Their capital, Knossos, had a well-organized water system for bringing in clean water, taking out waste water and storm sewage canals for overflow when there was heavy rain. One site possibly had a 16th-century BCE flush toilet. These Minoan sanitation facilities were connected to stone sewers that were regularly flushed by rain, flowing in through the collection system. In addition to sophisticated water and sewer systems they devised elaborate heating systems. The Ancient Greeks of Athens and Asia Minor also used an indoor plumbing system, used for pressurized showers. The Greek inventor Heron used pressurized piping for firefighting purposes in the City of Alexandria.

An inverted siphon system, along with glass-covered clay pipes, was used for the first time in the palaces of Crete, Greece. It is still in working condition after about 3000 years.

==== Roman Empire ====
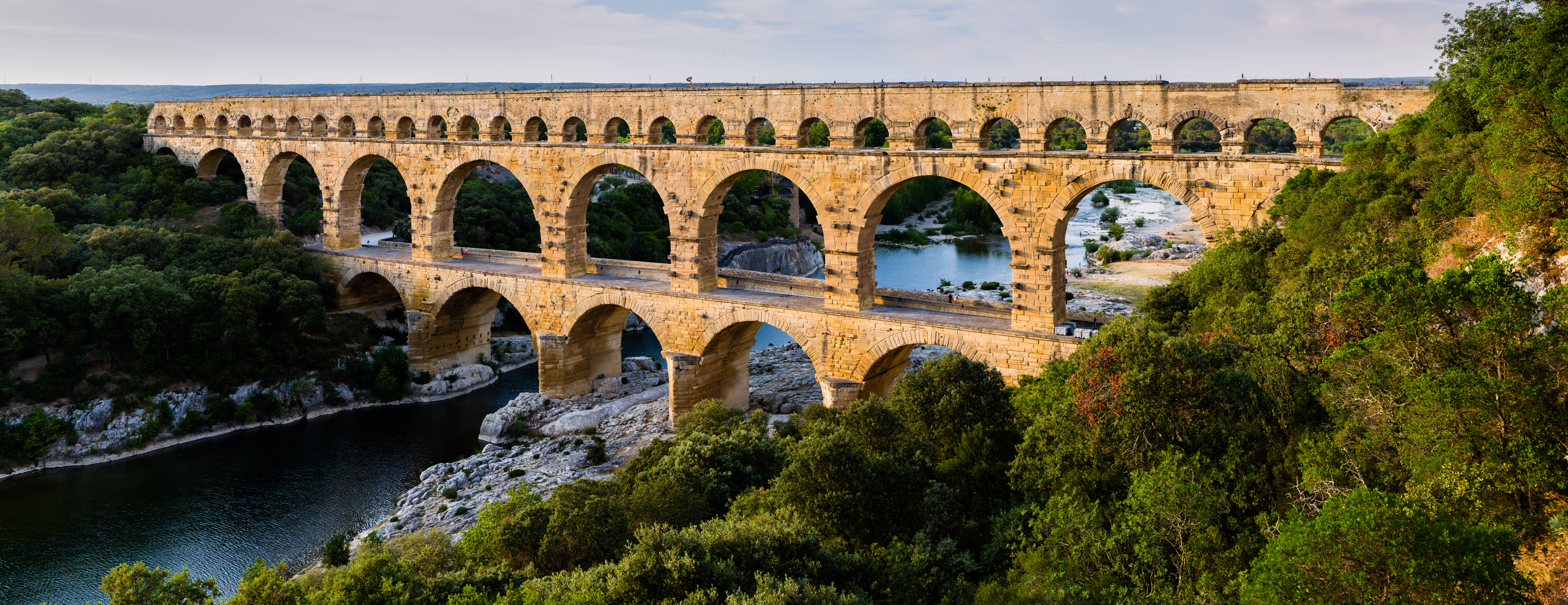
Pont du Gard, a Roman aqueduct in France

In ancient Rome, the Cloaca Maxima, considered a marvel of engineering, discharged into the Tiber. Public latrines were built over the Cloaca Maxima.

Beginning in the Roman era a water wheel device known as a noria supplied water to aqueducts and other water distribution systems in major cities in Europe and the Middle East.

The Roman Empire had indoor plumbing, meaning a system of aqueducts and pipes that terminated in homes and at public wells and fountains for people to use. Rome and other nations used lead pipes; while commonly thought to be the cause of lead poisoning in the Roman Empire, the combination of running water which did not stay in contact with the pipe for long and the deposition of precipitation scale actually mitigated the risk from lead pipes.

Towns and garrisons in the Roman Britain (between 46 BCE and 410 CE) had complex water supply and sewer networks. Supply pipes were often lead but could also be wooden with iron-ring reinforcement at intervals, and some were hollowed logs, jointed together. Stone-lined drains connected to sometimes massive sewer tunnels, such as at York. Latrines, such as those for the Hadrian's Wall garrison located at Housesteads were flushed with collected standing or rainwater.

== Medieval and early modern ages ==
=== Nepal ===
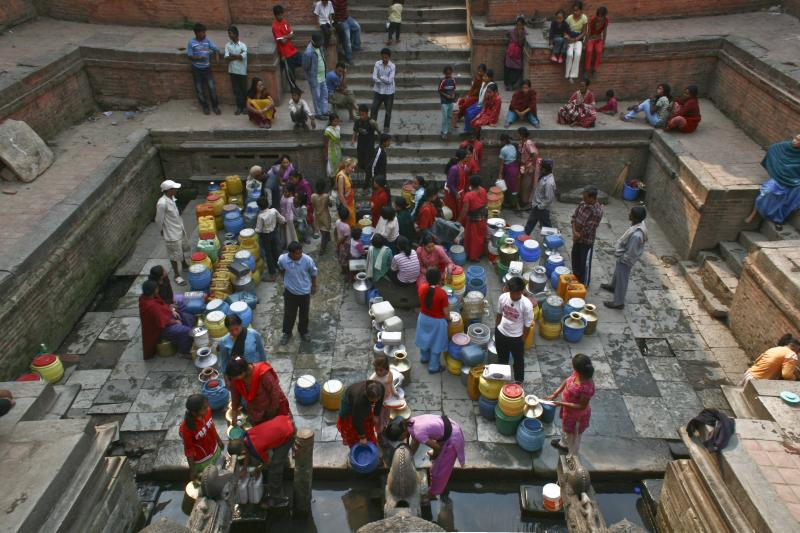
People waiting in line for water from Manga Hiti in the city of Patan, Nepal

In Nepal the construction of water conduits like drinking fountains and wells is considered a pious act.

A drinking water supply system was developed starting at least as early as 550 AD. This dhunge dhara or hiti system consists of carved stone fountains through which water flows uninterrupted from underground sources. These are supported by numerous ponds and canals that form an elaborate network of water bodies, created as a water resource during the dry season and to help alleviate the water pressure caused by the monsoon rains. After the introduction of modern, piped water systems, starting in the late 19th century, this old system has fallen into disrepair and some parts of it are lost forever. Nevertheless, many people of Nepal still rely on the old hitis on a daily basis.

In 2008 the dhunge dharas of the Kathmandu Valley produced 2.95 million litres of water per day.

Of the 389 stone spouts found in the Kathmandu Valley in 2010, 233 were still in use, serving about 10% of Kathmandu's population. 68 had gone dry, 45 were lost entirely and 43 were connected to the municipal water supply instead of their original source.

=== Islamic world ===
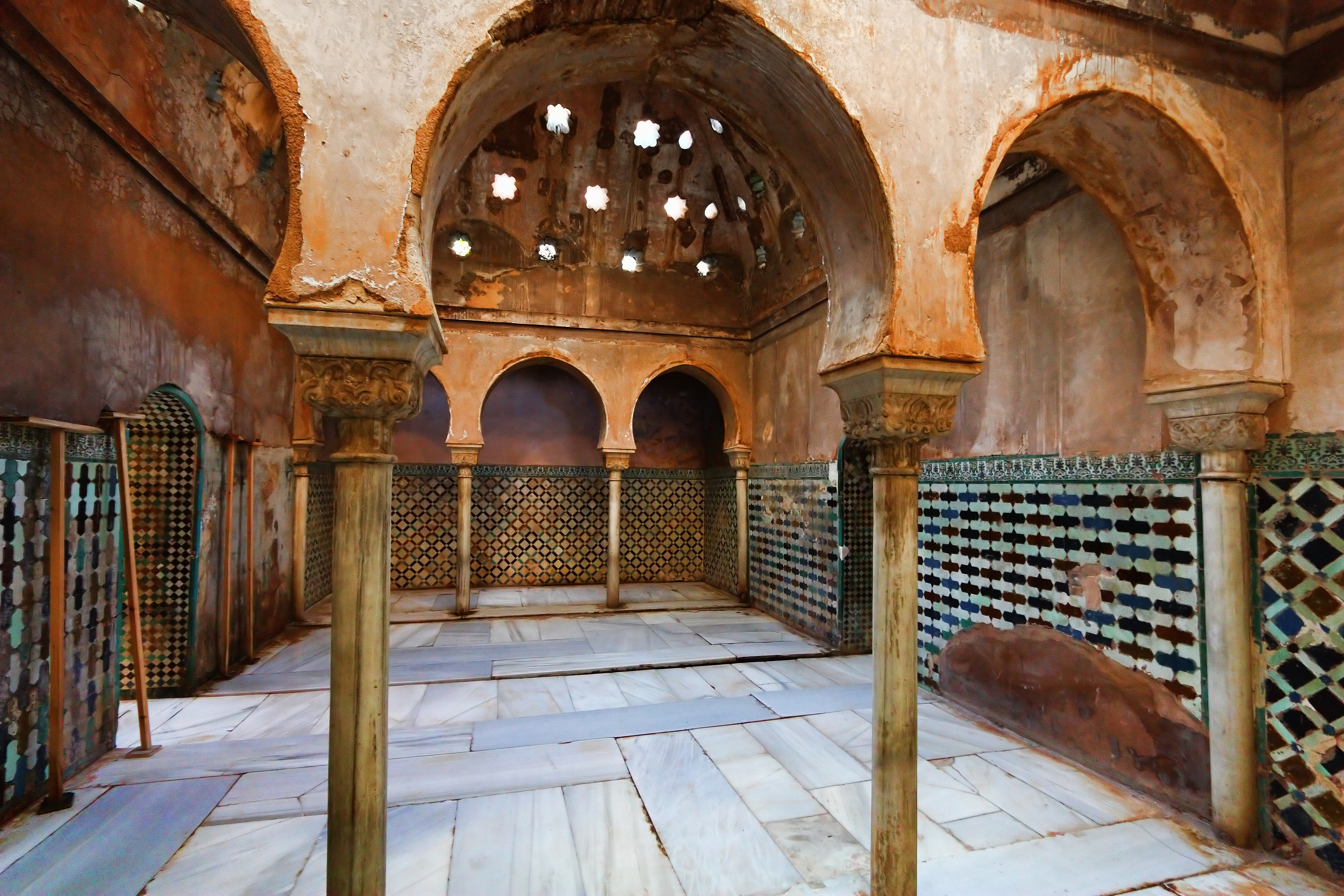
The Comares Baths at the Alhambra in Granada, Spain (14th century)

Islam stresses the importance of cleanliness and personal hygiene. Islamic hygienical jurisprudence, which dates back to the 7th century, has a number of elaborate rules. Taharah (ritual purity) involves performing wudu (ablution) for the five daily salah (prayers), as well as regularly performing ghusl (bathing), which led to bathhouses being built across the Islamic world. Islamic toilet hygiene also requires washing with water after using the toilet, for purity and to minimize germs.

In the Abbasid Caliphate (8th–13th centuries), its capital city of Baghdad (Iraq) had 65,000 baths, along with a sewer system. Cities of the medieval Islamic world had water supply systems powered by hydraulic technology that supplied drinking water along with much greater quantities of water for ritual washing, mainly in mosques and hammams (baths). Bathing establishments in various cities were rated by Arabic writers in travel guides. Medieval Islamic cities such as Baghdad, Córdoba (Islamic Spain), Fez (Morocco) and Fustat (Egypt) also had sophisticated waste disposal and sewage systems. The city of Fustat also had multi-storey tenement buildings (with up to six floors) with flush toilets, which were connected to a water supply system, and flues on each floor carrying waste to underground channels.

Al-Karaji (c. 953 – c. 1029) wrote a book, The Extraction of Hidden Waters, which presented ground-breaking ideas and descriptions of hydrological and hydrogeological perceptions such as components of the hydrological cycle, groundwater quality, and driving factors of groundwater flow. He also gave an early description of a water filtration process.

As the Islamic Golden Age waned and in later times, both Arab and European scholars criticised the condition of canals, streets and waterways at certain urban locations in Egypt. The Egyptian physician Ali ibn Ridwan wrote in the 11th century "the people of al-Fustat are in the habit of throwing whatever dies in their homes ... out into the streets and alleys where they decay, and their corruption mixes with the air. ... The sewers from their latrines also empty into the Nile. When the flow of water is cut off, the people drink this corruption mingled with the water". The 18th-century French Consul in Egypt, De Pauw, blamed the abandonment of the embalming practices of the Ancient Egyptians and the unsuitability of modern burial practices for the Nile delta for the area becoming "a hotbed of the plague". Some colonial commentary of this kind seemed informed by attitudes underpinning the ruling powers. For instance, the British doctor J. W Simpson wrote in 1883 "the residents of Damietta [Egypt] have little respect for water, contaminating the Nile and its canals ... Arabs do not know mud from clean water"; the historians Schultz, Hipwood and Lee, writing in 2023, conclude the tenor of Simspson's report "reinforces the British colonial view of Egyptians as inferior to European colonisers".

=== Sub-Saharan Africa ===
In post-classical Kilwa, plumbing was prevalent in the stone homes of the natives. The Husani Kubwa Palace, as well as other buildings for the ruling elite and wealthy, included the luxury of indoor plumbing.

In the Ashanti Empire, toilets were housed in two story buildings that were flushed with gallons of boiling water.

=== Medieval Europe ===
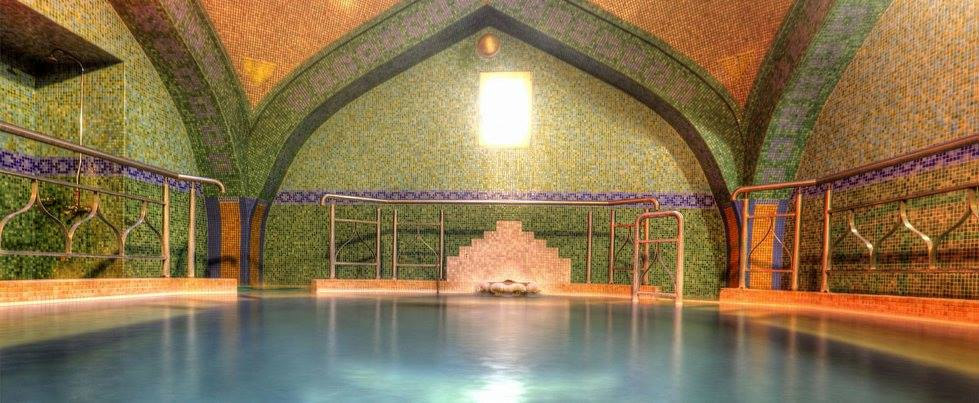
Agkistro Byzantine bath

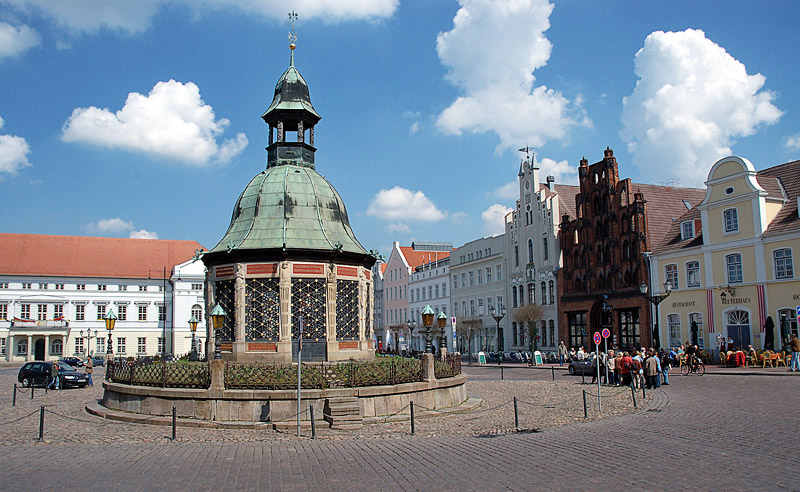
Waterworks (Wasserkunst) and fountain from 1602 in Wismar, Germany

Christianity places an emphasis on hygiene. Despite the denunciation of the mixed bathing style of Roman pools by early Christian clergy, as well as the pagan custom of women naked bathing in front of men, this did not stop the Church from urging its followers to go to public baths for bathing, which contributed to hygiene and good health according to the Church Fathers, Clement of Alexandria and Tertullian. The Church built public bathing facilities that were separate for both sexes near monasteries and pilgrimage sites; also, the popes situated baths within church basilicas and monasteries since the early Middle Ages. Pope Gregory the Great urged his followers on value of bathing as a bodily need.

Contrary to popular belief, bathing and sanitation were not lost in Europe with the collapse of the Roman Empire. Public bathhouses were common in medieval Christendom larger towns and cities such as Constantinople, Paris, Regensburg, Rome and Naples. And great bathhouses were built in Byzantine centers such as Constantinople and Antioch.

There is little record of other sanitation systems (apart from sanitation in ancient Rome) in most of Europe until the High Middle Ages. Unsanitary conditions and overcrowding were widespread throughout Europe and Asia during the Middle Ages. This resulted in pandemics such as the Plague of Justinian (541–542) and the Black Death (1347–1351), which killed tens of millions of people. Very high infant and child mortality prevailed in Europe throughout medieval times, due partly to deficiencies in sanitation.

In medieval European cities, small natural waterways used for carrying off wastewater were eventually covered over and functioned as sewers. London's River Fleet is such a system. Open drains, or gutters, for waste water run-off ran along the center of some streets. These were known as "kennels" (i.e., canals, channels), and in Paris were sometimes known as "split streets", as the wastewater running along the middle physically split the streets into two halves. The first closed sewer constructed in Paris was designed by Hugues Aubird in 1370 on Rue Montmartre (Montmartre Street) and was 300 metres (980 ft) long. The original purpose of designing and constructing a closed sewer in Paris was less-so for waste management as much as it was to hold back the stench coming from the odorous waste water.

In Dubrovnik, then known as Ragusa (Latin name), the Statute of 1272 set out the parameters for the construction of septic tanks and channels for the removal of dirty water. Throughout the 14th and 15th century the sewage system was built, and it is still operational today, with minor changes and repairs done in recent centuries.

Pail closets, outhouses, and cesspits were used to collect human waste. The use of human waste as fertilizer was especially important in China and Japan, where cattle manure was less available. However, most cities did not have a functioning sewer system before the Industrial era, relying instead on nearby rivers or occasional rain showers to wash away the sewage from the streets. In some places, waste water simply ran down the streets, which had stepping stones to keep pedestrians out of the muck, and eventually drained as runoff into the local watershed.

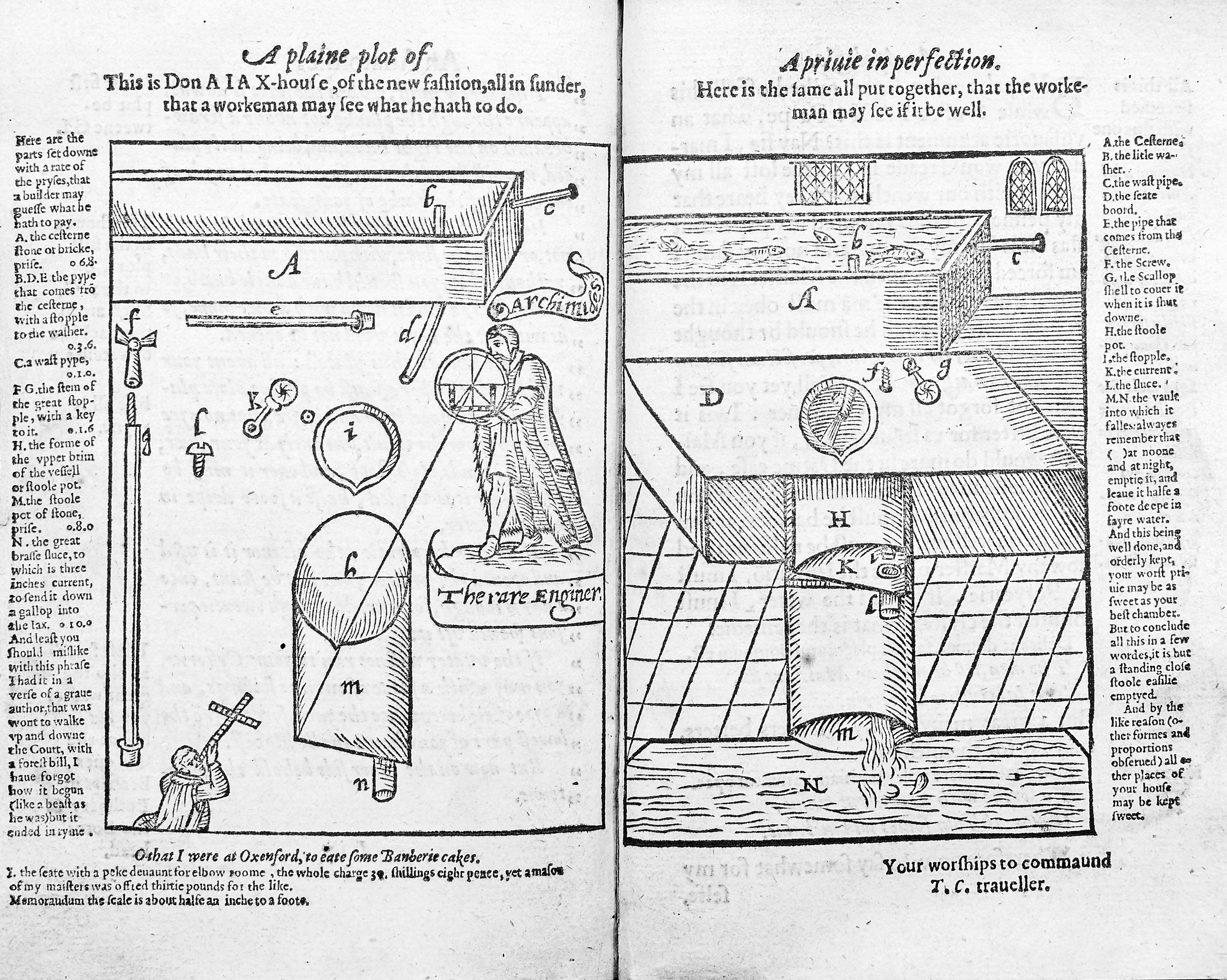
John Harington's toilet

In the 16th century, Sir John Harington invented a flush toilet as a device for Queen Elizabeth I (his godmother) that released wastes into cesspools.

After the adoption of gunpowder, municipal outhouses became an important source of raw material for the making of saltpeter in European countries.

In London, the contents of the city's outhouses were collected nightly by commissioned wagons and delivered to the nitrite beds where it was laid into specially designed soil beds to produce earth rich in mineral nitrates. The nitrate rich-earth would be then further processed to produce saltpeter, or potassium nitrate, an important ingredient in black powder that played a part in the making of gunpowder.

=== Classic and early modern Mesoamerica ===
The Classic Maya at Palenque had underground aqueducts and flush toilets; the Classic Maya even used household water filters using locally abundant limestone carved into a porous cylinder, made so as to work in a manner strikingly similar to Modern ceramic water filters.

In Spain and Spanish America, a community operated watercourse known as an acequia, combined with a simple sand filtration system, provided potable water.

=== Sewage farms for disposal and irrigation ===
“Sewage farms" (i.e. wastewater application to the land for disposal and agricultural use) were operated in Bunzlau (Silesia) in 1531, in Edinburgh (Scotland) in 1650, in Paris (France) in 1868, in Berlin (Germany) in 1876 and in different parts of the US since 1871, where wastewater was used for beneficial crop production. In the following centuries (16th and 18th centuries) in many rapidly growing countries/cities of Europe (e.g. Germany, France) and the United States, "sewage farms" were increasingly seen as a solution for the disposal of large volumes of the wastewater, some of which are still in operation today. Irrigation with sewage and other wastewater effluents has a long history also in China and India; while also a large "sewage farm" was established in Melbourne, Australia, in 1897.

== Modern age ==
=== Water supply ===
London water supply infrastructure developed over many centuries from early mediaeval conduits, through major 19th-century treatment works built in response to cholera threats, to modern, large-scale reservoirs. An ambitious engineering project to bring fresh water from Hertfordshire to London was undertaken by Hugh Myddleton, who oversaw the construction of the New River between 1609 and 1613. The New River Company became one of the largest private water companies of the time, supplying the City of London and other central areas. The first civic system of piped water in England was established in Derby in 1692, using wooden pipes, which was common for several centuries. The Derby Waterworks included waterwheel-powered pumps for raising water out of the River Derwent and storage tanks for distribution.

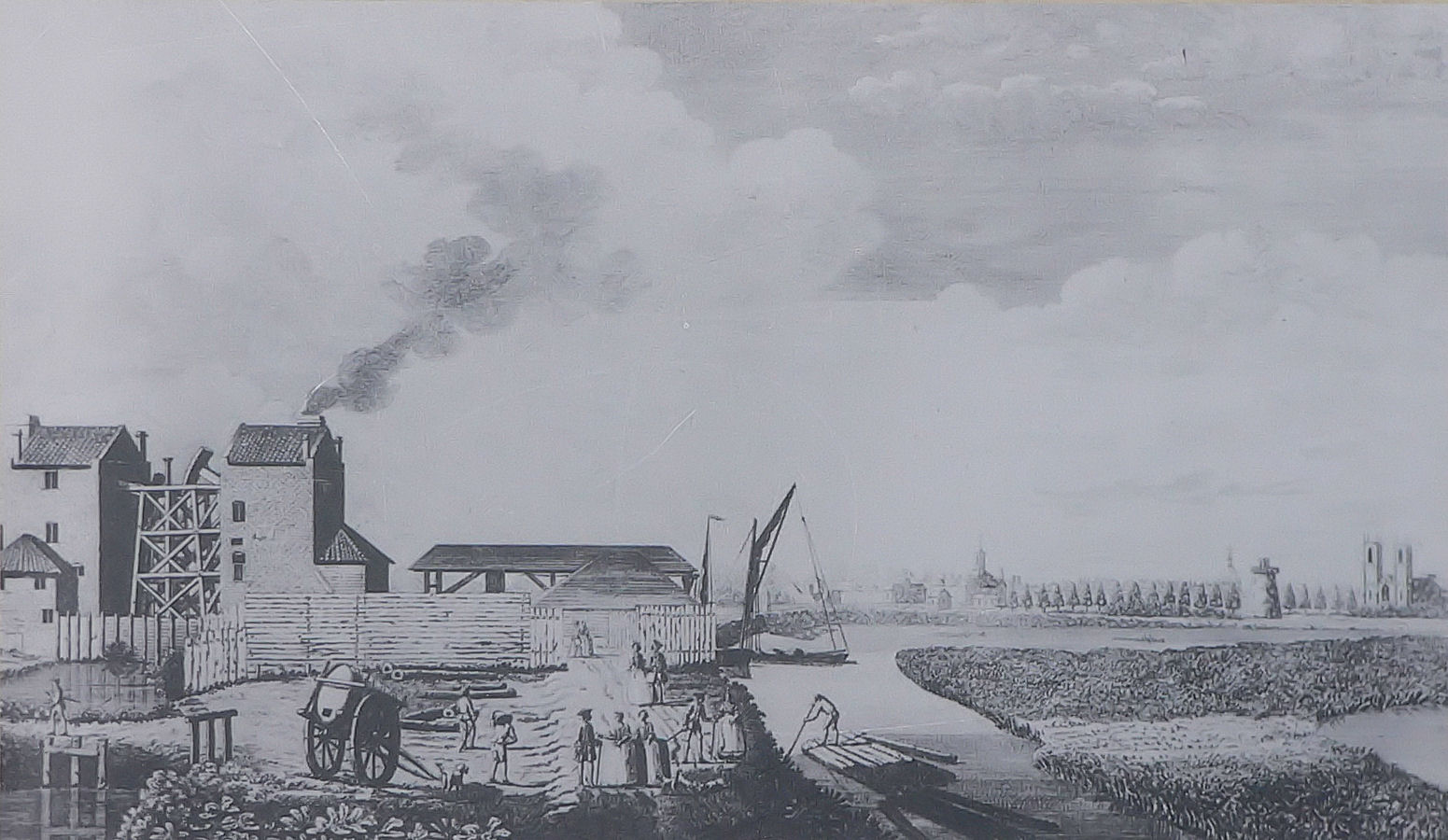
Chelsea Waterworks, 1752. Two Newcomen beam engines pumped Thames water from a canal to reservoirs at Green Park and Hyde Park.

Until the Enlightenment era, little progress was made in water supply and sanitation. It was in the 18th century that a rapidly growing population fueled a boom in the establishment of private water supply networks in London. The Chelsea Waterworks Company was established in 1723 "for the better supplying the City and Liberties of Westminster and parts adjacent with water". The company created extensive ponds in the area bordering Chelsea and Pimlico using water from the tidal Thames. Other waterworks were established in London, including at West Ham in 1743, at Lea Bridge before 1767, Lambeth Waterworks Company in 1785, West Middlesex Waterworks Company in 1806 and Grand Junction Waterworks Company in 1811.

The S-bend pipe was invented by Alexander Cummings in 1775 but became known as the U-bend following the introduction of the U-shaped trap by Thomas Crapper in 1880. The first screw-down water tap was patented, in 1845, by Guest and Chrimes, a brass foundry in Rotherham. Maughan, of London, would develop the first instantaneous, gas powered, domestic water heater, in 1868. The Mixer tap was invented, by Thomas Campbell of Saint John, New Brunswick, in 1880, to combine hot and cold water.

The first documented use of sand filters to purify the water supply dates to 1804, when the owner of a bleachery in Paisley, Scotland, John Gibb, installed an experimental filter, selling his unwanted surplus to the public. The first treated public water supply in the world was installed by engineer James Simpson for the Chelsea Waterworks Company in London in 1829. The practice of water treatment soon became mainstream, and the virtues of the system were made starkly apparent after the investigations of the physician John Snow during the 1854 Broad Street cholera outbreak demonstrated the role of the water supply in spreading the cholera epidemic.

=== Sewer systems ===
A significant development was the construction of a network of sewers to collect wastewater. In some cities, including Rome, Istanbul (Constantinople) and Fustat, networked ancient sewer systems continue to function today as collection systems for those cities' modernized sewer systems. Instead of flowing to a river or the sea, the pipes have been re-routed to modern sewer treatment facilities.

Before modern sewers were invented, cesspools that collected human waste were the most widely used sanitation system. In ancient Mesopotamia, vertical shafts carried waste away into cesspools. Similar systems existed in the Indus Valley civilization in modern-day Pakistan and in Ancient Crete and Greece. In the Middle Ages waste was collected into cesspools that were periodically emptied by workers known as 'rakers' who would often sell it as fertilizer to farmers outside the city.

Archaeological discoveries have shown that some of the earliest sewer systems were developed in the third millennium BCE in the ancient cities of Harappa and Mohenjo-daro in present-day Pakistan. The primitive sewers were carved in the ground alongside buildings. This discovery reveals the conceptual understanding of waste disposal by early civilizations.

The tremendous growth of cities in Europe and North America during the Industrial Revolution quickly led to crowding, which acted as a constant source for the outbreak of disease. As cities grew in the 19th century concerns were raised about public health. As part of a trend of municipal sanitation programs in the late 19th and 20th centuries, many cities constructed extensive gravity sewer systems to help control outbreaks of disease such as typhoid and cholera. Storm and sanitary sewers were necessarily developed along with the growth of cities. By the 1840s the luxury of indoor plumbing, which mixes human waste with water and flushes it away, eliminated the need for cesspools.

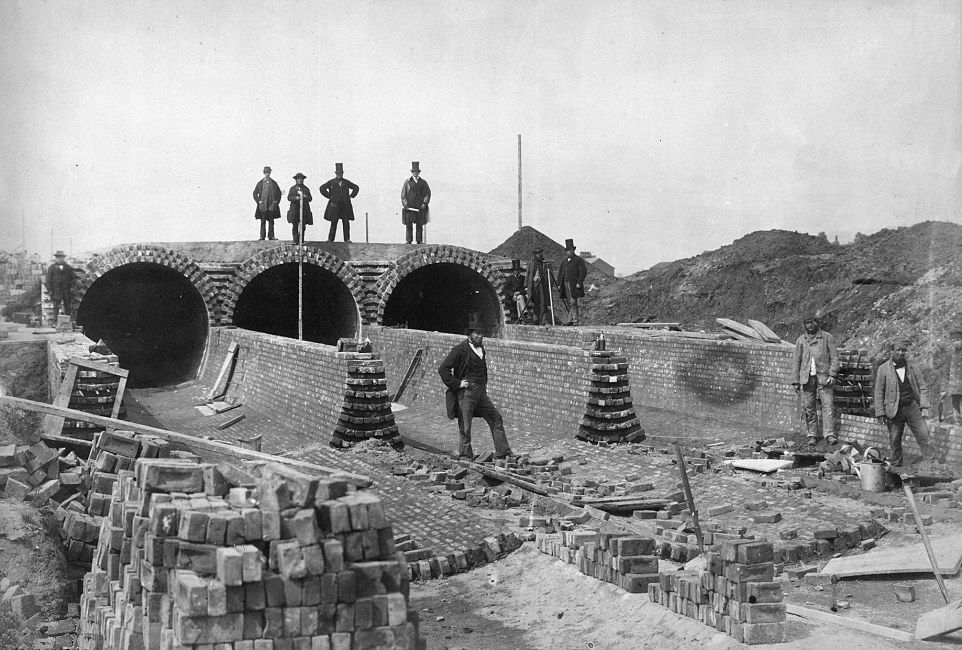
The London sewer system being built in 1860 led by the chief engineer Joseph Bazalgette (top right)

Modern sewerage systems were first built in the mid-nineteenth century as a reaction to the exacerbation of sanitary conditions brought on by heavy industrialization and urbanization. Baldwin Latham, a British civil engineer contributed to the rationalization of sewerage and house drainage systems and was a pioneer in sanitary engineering. He developed the concept of oval sewage pipe to facilitate sewer drainage and to prevent sludge deposition and flooding. Due to the contaminated water supply, cholera outbreaks occurred in 1832, 1849 and 1855 in London, killing tens of thousands of people. This, combined with the Great Stink of 1858, when the smell of untreated human waste in the River Thames became overpowering, and the report into sanitation reform of the royal commissioner Edwin Chadwick, led to the Metropolitan Commission of Sewers appointing engineer Joseph Bazalgette to construct a vast underground sewage system for the safe removal of waste. Contrary to Chadwick's recommendations, Bazalgette's system, and others later built in Continental Europe, did not pump the sewage onto farm land for use as fertilizer; it was simply piped to a natural waterway away from population centres, and pumped back into the environment.

==== Liverpool, London and other places in the UK ====
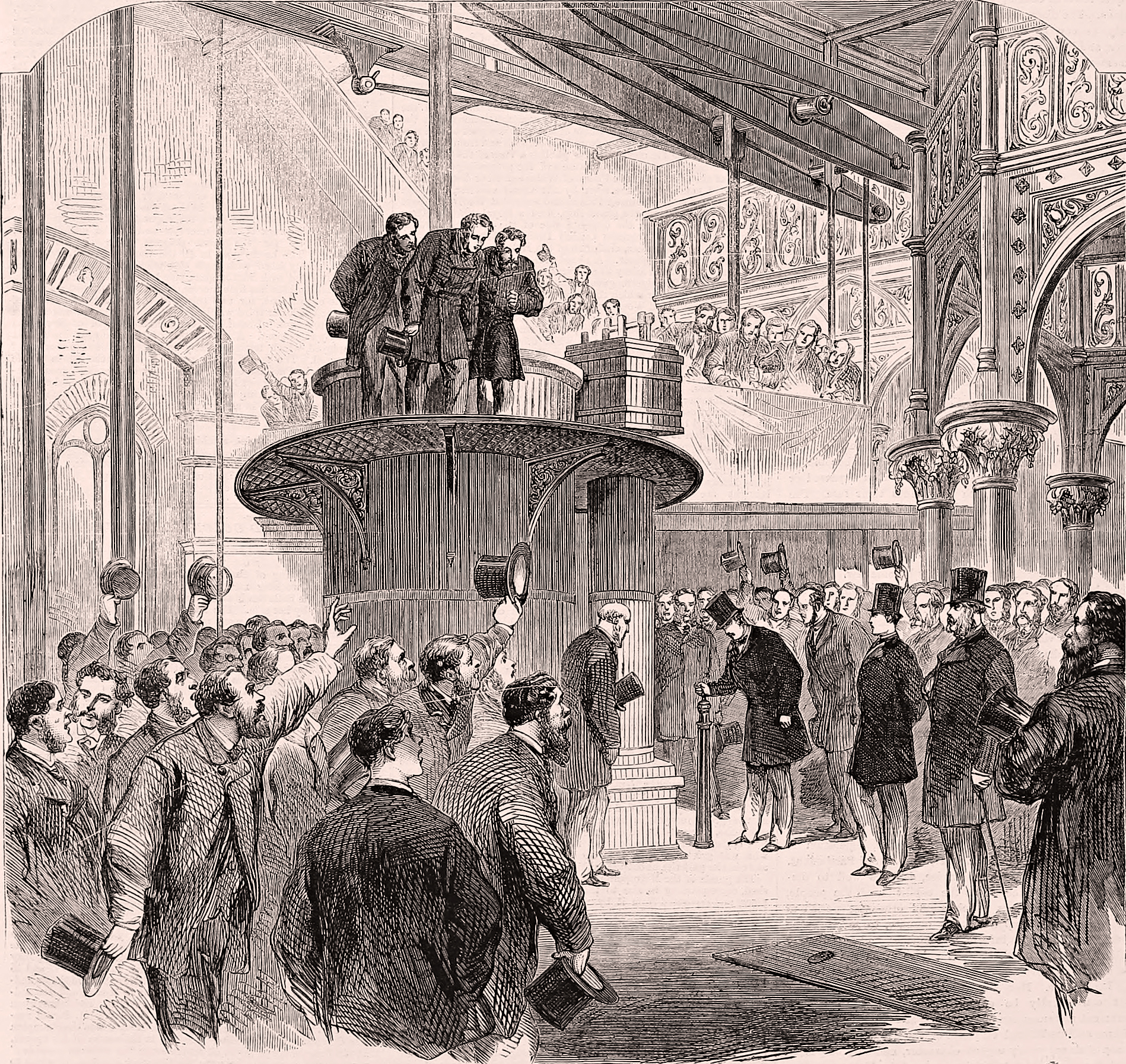
Edward, Prince of Wales opening Bazalgette's Crossness Pumping Station, 1865

As recently as the late 19th-century, sewerage systems in some parts of the rapidly industrializing United Kingdom were so inadequate that water-borne diseases such as cholera and typhoid remained a risk. From as early as 1535, there were efforts to stop polluting the River Thames in London. Beginning with an Act passed that year that was to prohibit the dumping of excrement into the river. Leading up to the Industrial Revolution the River Thames was identified as being thick and black due to sewage, and it was even said that the river "smells like death".

As Britain was the first country to industrialize, it was also the first to experience the disastrous consequences of major urbanization and was the first to construct a modern sewerage system to mitigate the resultant unsanitary conditions. During the early 19th century, the River Thames was effectively an open sewer, leading to frequent outbreaks of cholera epidemics. Proposals to modernize the sewerage system had been made during 1856, but were neglected due to lack of funds. However, after the Great Stink of 1858, Parliament realized the urgency of the problem and resolved to create a modern sewerage system.

===== Liverpool =====
However, ten years earlier and 200 miles to the north, James Newlands, a Scottish Engineer, was one of a celebrated trio of pioneering officers appointed under a private Act, the Liverpool Sanitory Act by the Borough of Liverpool Health of Towns Committee. The other officers appointed under the Act were William Henry Duncan, Medical Officer for Health, and Thomas Fresh, Inspector of Nuisances (an early antecedent of the environmental health officer). One of five applicants for the post, Newlands was appointed Borough Engineer of Liverpool on 26 January 1847.

He made a careful and exact survey of Liverpool and its surroundings, involving approximately 3,000 geodetical observations, and resulting in the construction of a contour map of the town and its neighbourhood, on a scale of one inch to 20 feet (6.1 m). From this elaborate survey Newlands proceeded to lay down a comprehensive system of outlet and contributory sewers, and main and subsidiary drains, to an aggregate extent of nearly 300 miles (480 km). The details of this projected system he presented to the Corporation in April 1848.

In July 1848, James Newlands' sewer construction programme began, and over the next 11 years 86 miles (138 km) of new sewers were built. Between 1856 and 1862, another 58 miles (93 km) were added. This programme was completed in 1869. Before the sewers were built, life expectancy in Liverpool was 19 years, and by the time Newlands retired it had more than doubled.

===== London =====
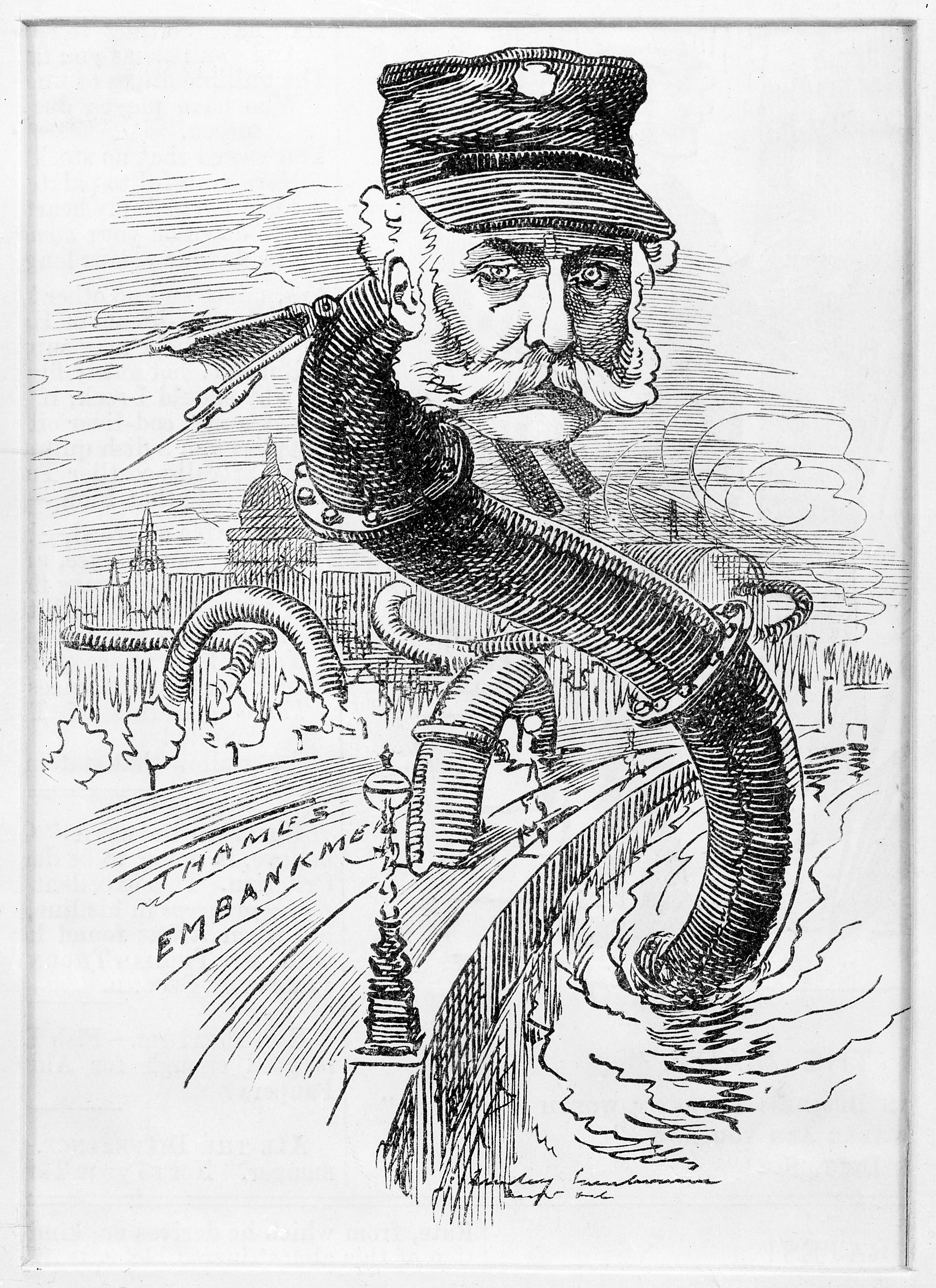
Bazalgette as the "Sewer Snake", Punch, 1883

Joseph Bazalgette, a civil engineer and Chief Engineer of the Metropolitan Board of Works, was given responsibility for similar work in London. According to the BBC, "Bazalgette drove himself to the limits in realising his subterranean dream". He designed an extensive underground sewerage system that diverted waste to the Thames Estuary, downstream of the main center of population. Six main interceptor sewers, totaling almost 100 miles (160 km) in length, were constructed, some incorporating stretches of London's 'lost' rivers. Three of these sewers were north of the river, the southernmost, low-level one being incorporated in the Thames Embankment. The Embankment also allowed new roads, new public gardens, and the Circle Line of the London Underground.

The intercepting sewers, constructed between 1859 and 1865, were fed by 450 miles (720 km) of main sewers that, in turn, conveyed the contents of some 13,000 miles (21,000 km) of smaller local sewers. Construction of the interceptor system required 318 million bricks, 2.7 million cubic metres of excavated earth and 670,000 cubic metres of concrete. Gravity allowed the sewage to flow eastwards, but in places such as Chelsea, Deptford and Abbey Mills, pumping stations were built to raise the water and provide sufficient flow. Sewers north of the Thames feed into the Northern Outfall Sewer, which fed into a major treatment works at Beckton. South of the river, the Southern Outfall Sewer extended to a similar facility at Crossness. With only minor modifications, Bazalgette's engineering achievement remains the basis for sewerage design up into the present day.

===== Other places in the UK =====
In Merthyr Tydfil, a large town in South Wales, most houses discharged their sewage to individual cess-pits which persistently overflowed causing the pavements to be awash with foul sewage.

==== Paris, France ====
In 1802, Napoleon built the Ourcq canal which brought 70,000 cubic meters of water a day to Paris, while the Seine river received up to 100,000 cubic meters (3,500,000 cu ft) of wastewater per day. The Paris cholera epidemic of 1832 sharpened the public awareness of the necessity for some sort of drainage system to deal with sewage and wastewater in a better and healthier way. Between 1865 and 1920, Eugene Belgrand led the development of a large scale system for water supply and wastewater management. Between these years approximately 600 kilometers of aqueducts were built to bring in potable spring water, which freed the poor quality water to be used for flushing streets and sewers. By 1894 laws were passed which made drainage mandatory. The treatment of Paris sewage, though, was left to natural devices as 5,000 hectares of land were used to spread the waste out to be naturally purified. Further, the lack of sewage treatment left Parisian sewage pollution to become concentrated downstream in the town of Clichy, effectively forcing residents to pack up and move elsewhere.

The 19th century brick-vaulted Paris sewers serve as a tourist attraction nowadays.

==== Hamburg and Frankfurt, Germany ====
The first comprehensive sewer system in a German city was built in Hamburg, Germany, in the mid-19th century.

In 1863, work began on the construction of a modern sewerage system for the rapidly growing city of Frankfurt am Main, based on design work by William Lindley. 20 years after the system's completion, the death rate from typhoid had fallen from 80 to 10 per 100,000 inhabitants.

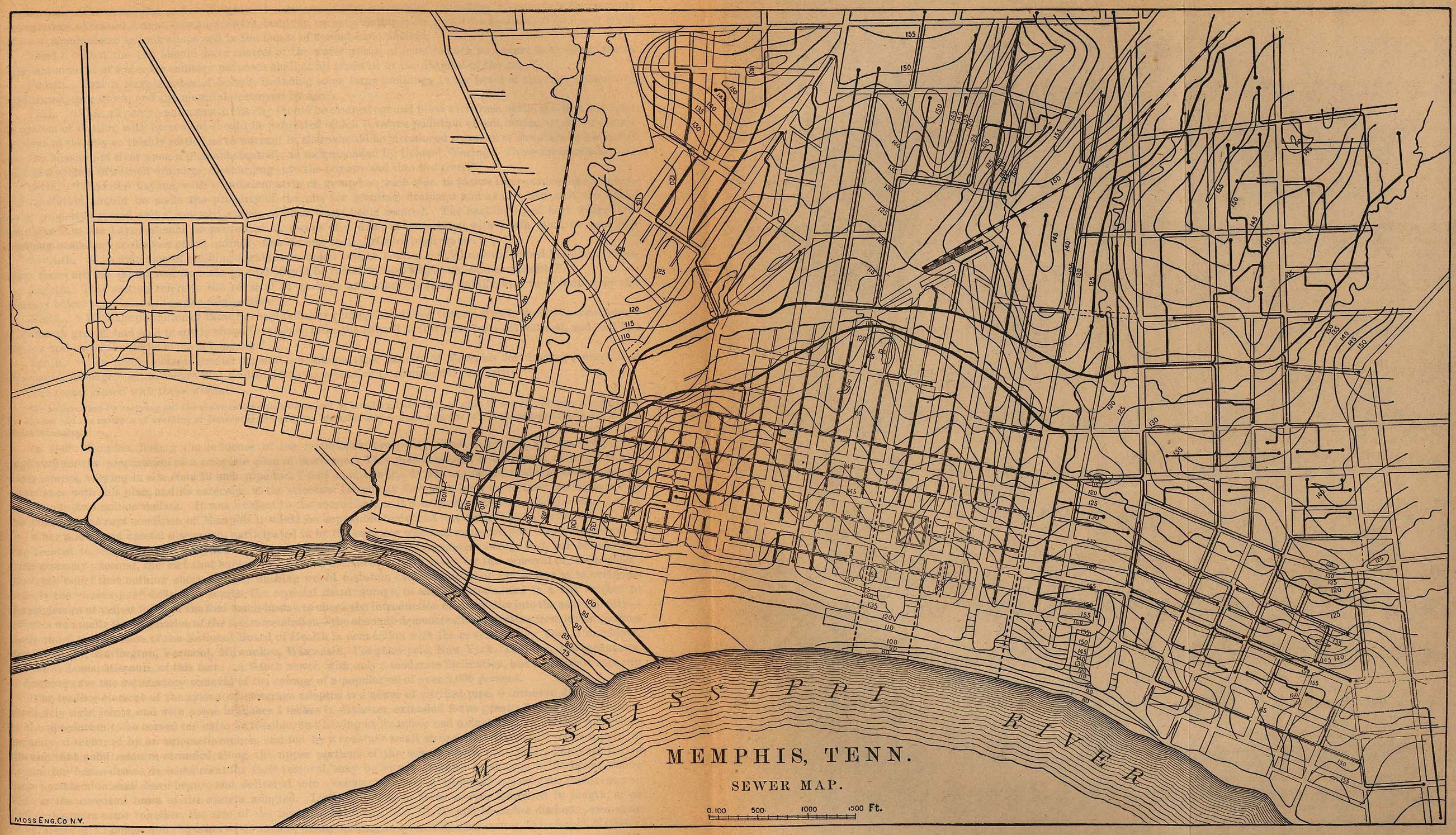
The sewer system of Memphis, Tennessee in 1880

==== United States ====
The first sewer systems in the United States were built in the late 1850s in Chicago and Brooklyn.

In the United States, the first sewage treatment plant using chemical precipitation was built in Worcester, Massachusetts, in 1890.

=== Sewage treatment ===
Initially, the gravity sewer systems discharged sewage directly to surface waters without treatment. Later, cities attempted to treat the sewage before discharge in order to prevent water pollution and waterborne diseases. During the half-century around 1900, these public health interventions succeeded in drastically reducing the incidence of water-borne diseases among the urban population, and were an important cause in the increases of life expectancy experienced at the time.

==== Application on agricultural land ====
Early techniques for sewage treatment involved land application of sewage on agricultural land. One of the first attempts at diverting sewage for use as a fertilizer in the farm was made by the cotton mill owner James Smith in the 1840s. He experimented with a piped distribution system initially proposed by James Vetch that collected sewage from his factory and pumped it into the outlying farms, and his success was enthusiastically followed by Edwin Chadwick and supported by organic chemist Justus von Liebig.

The idea was officially adopted by the Health of Towns Commission, and various schemes (known as sewage farms) were trialled by different municipalities over the next 50 years. At first, the heavier solids were channeled into ditches on the side of the farm and were covered over when full, but soon flat-bottomed tanks were employed as reservoirs for the sewage; the earliest patent was taken out by William Higgs in 1846 for "tanks or reservoirs in which the contents of sewers and drains from cities, towns and villages are to be collected and the solid animal or vegetable matters therein contained, solidified and dried..." Improvements to the design of the tanks included the introduction of the horizontal-flow tank in the 1850s and the radial-flow tank in 1905. These tanks had to be manually de-sludged periodically, until the introduction of automatic mechanical de-sludgers in the early 1900s.

==== Chemical treatment and sedimentation ====
As pollution of water bodies became a concern, cities attempted to treat the sewage before discharge. In the late 19th century some cities began to add chemical treatment and sedimentation systems to their sewers. In the United States, the first sewage treatment plant using chemical precipitation was built in Worcester, Massachusetts in 1890. During the half-century around 1900, these public health interventions succeeded in drastically reducing the incidence of water-borne diseases among the urban population, and were an important cause in the increases of life expectancy experienced at the time.

Odor was considered the big problem in waste disposal and to address it, sewage could be drained to a lagoon, or "settled" and the solids removed, to be disposed of separately. This process is now called "primary treatment" and the settled solids are called "sludge." At the end of the 19th century, since primary treatment still left odor problems, it was discovered that bad odors could be prevented by introducing oxygen into the decomposing sewage. This was the beginning of the biological aerobic and anaerobic treatments which are fundamental to wastewater processes.

The precursor to the modern septic tank was the cesspool in which the water was sealed off to prevent contamination and the solid waste was slowly liquified due to anaerobic action; it was invented by L.H Mouras in France in the 1860s. Donald Cameron, as City Surveyor for Exeter patented an improved version in 1895, which he called a 'septic tank'; septic having the meaning of 'bacterial'. These are still in worldwide use, especially in rural areas unconnected to large-scale sewage systems.

==== Biological treatment ====
It was not until the late 19th century that it became possible to treat the sewage by biologically decomposing the organic components through the use of microorganisms and removing the pollutants. Land treatment was also steadily becoming less feasible, as cities grew and the volume of sewage produced could no longer be absorbed by the farmland on the outskirts.

Edward Frankland conducted experiments at the sewage farm in Croydon, England during the 1870s and was able to demonstrate that filtration of sewage through porous gravel produced a nitrified effluent (the ammonia was converted into nitrate) and that the filter remained unclogged over long periods of time. This established the then revolutionary possibility of biological treatment of sewage using a contact bed to oxidize the waste. This concept was taken up by the chief chemist for the London Metropolitan Board of Works, William Dibdin, in 1887:

...in all probability the true way of purifying sewage...will be first to separate the sludge, and then turn into neutral effluent... retain it for a sufficient period, during which time it should be fully aerated, and finally discharge it into the stream in a purified condition. This is indeed what is aimed at and imperfectly accomplished on a sewage farm.

From 1885 to 1891, filters working on Dibdin's principle were constructed throughout the UK and the idea was also taken up in the US at the Lawrence Experiment Station in Massachusetts, where Frankland's work was confirmed. In 1890, the LES developed a 'trickling filter' that gave a much more reliable performance.

Contact beds were developed in Salford, Lancashire and by scientists working for the London County Council in the early 1890s. According to Christopher Hamlin, this was part of a conceptual revolution that replaced the philosophy that saw "sewage purification as the prevention of decomposition with one that tried to facilitate the biological process that destroy sewage naturally."

Contact beds were tanks containing an inert substance, such as stones or slate, that maximized the surface area available for the microbial growth to break down the sewage. The sewage was held in the tank until it was fully decomposed and it was then filtered out into the ground. This method quickly became widespread, especially in the UK, where it was used in Leicester, Sheffield, Manchester and Leeds. The bacterial bed was simultaneously developed by Joseph Corbett as Borough Engineer in Salford and experiments in 1905 showed that his method was superior in that greater volumes of sewage could be purified better for longer periods of time than could be achieved by the contact bed.

The Royal Commission on Sewage Disposal published its eighth report in 1912 that set what became the international standard for sewage discharge into rivers; the '20:30 standard', which allowed "2 parts per hundred thousand" of Biochemical oxygen demand and "3 parts per hundred thousand" of suspended solid.

===== Activated sludge process =====
Most cities in the Western world added more effective systems for sewage treatment in the early 20th century, after scientists at the University of Manchester discovered the sewage treatment process of activated sludge in 1912.

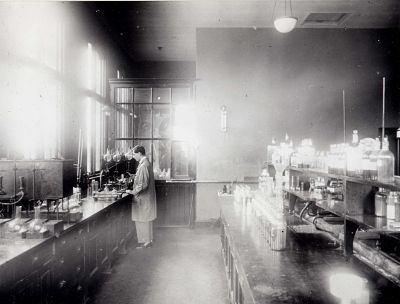
The Davyhulme Sewage Works Laboratory, where the activated sludge process was developed in the early 20th century

The activated sludge process was discovered in 1913 in the United Kingdom by two engineers, Edward Ardern and W.T. Lockett, who were conducting research for the Manchester Corporation Rivers Department at Davyhulme Sewage Works. In 1912, Gilbert Fowler, a scientist at the University of Manchester, observed experiments being conducted at the Lawrence Experiment Station at Massachusetts involving the aeration of sewage in a bottle that had been coated with algae. Fowler's engineering colleagues, Ardern and Lockett, experimented on treating sewage in a draw-and-fill reactor, which produced a highly treated effluent. They aerated the waste-water continuously for about a month and were able to achieve a complete nitrification of the sample material. Believing that the sludge had been activated (in a similar manner to activated carbon) the process was named activated sludge. Not until much later was it realized that what had actually occurred was a means to concentrate biological organisms, decoupling the liquid retention time (ideally, low, for a compact treatment system) from the solids retention time (ideally, fairly high, for an effluent low in BOD_{5} and ammonia.)

Their results were published in their seminal 1914 paper, and the first full-scale continuous-flow system was installed at Worcester two years later. In the aftermath of the First World War the new treatment method spread rapidly, especially to the US, Denmark, Germany and Canada. By the late 1930s, the activated sludge treatment became a well-known biological wastewater treatment process in those countries where sewer systems and sewage treatment plants were common.

=== Toilets ===
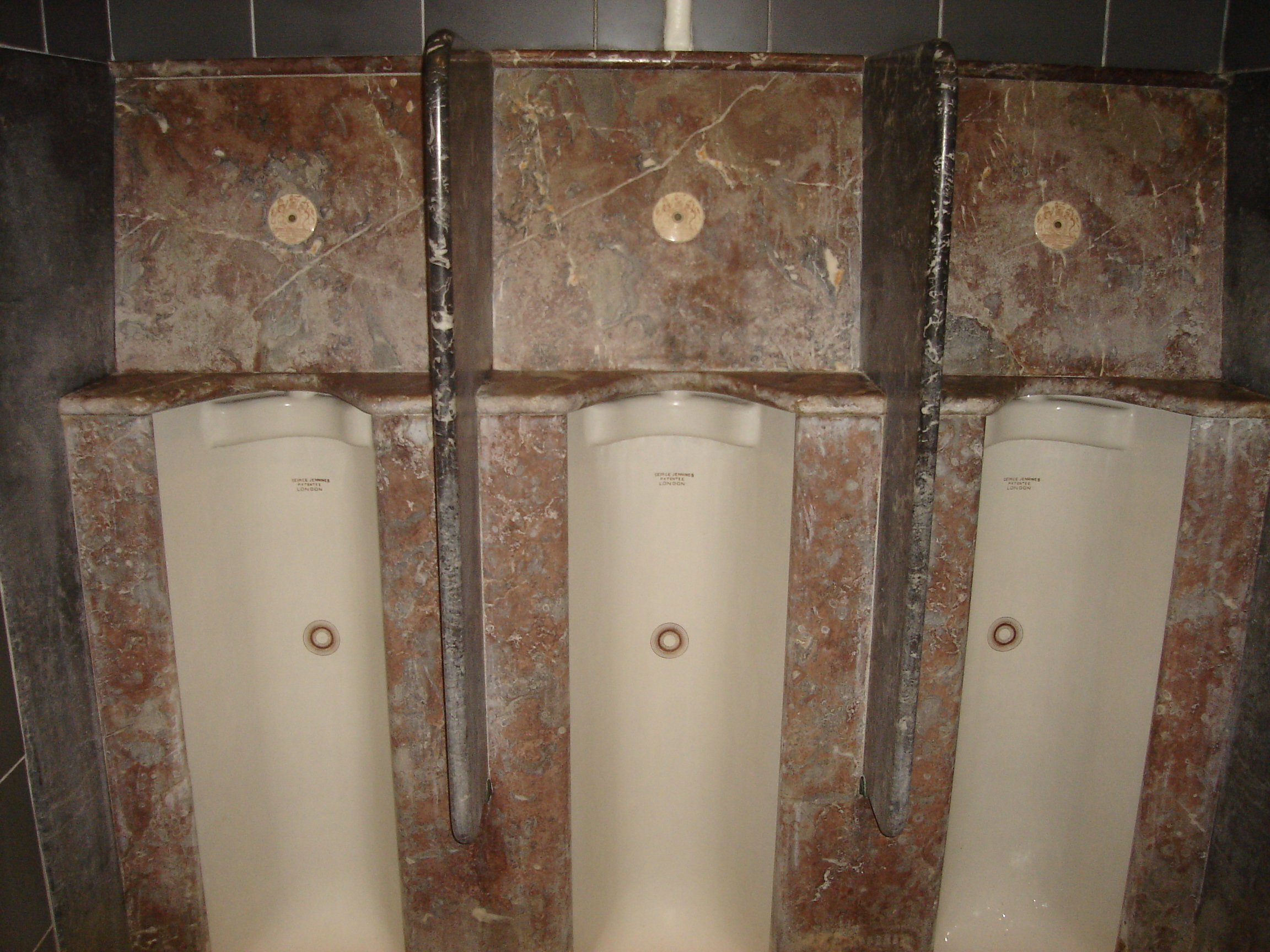
George Jennings's urinals at the Windermere hotel

With the onset of the Industrial Revolution and related advances in technology, the flush toilet began to emerge into its modern form in the late 18th century, (See Development of the modern flush toilet.) At the Great Exhibition of 1851 held at Hyde Park in London, George Jennings installed the first public flush toilets.

In urban areas, toilets are typically connected to a municipal sanitary sewer system, while in more rural areas they are usually connected to an onsite sewage facility (septic system). Where this is not feasible or desired, dry toilets are an alternative option.

=== Water treatment ===
==== Sand filter ====
Sir Francis Bacon attempted to desalinate sea water by passing the flow through a sand filter. Although his experiment did not succeed, it marked the beginning of a new interest in the field.

The first documented use of sand filters to purify the water supply dates to 1804, when the owner of a bleachery in Paisley, Scotland, John Gibb, installed an experimental filter, selling his unwanted surplus to the public. This method was refined in the following two decades by engineers working for private water companies, and it culminated in the first treated public water supply in the world, installed by engineer James Simpson for the Chelsea Waterworks Company in London in 1829. This installation provided filtered water for every resident of the area, and the network design was widely copied throughout the United Kingdom in the ensuing decades.

The Metropolis Water Act introduced the regulation of the water supply companies in London, including minimum standards of water quality for the first time. The Act "made provision for securing the supply to the Metropolis of pure and wholesome water", and required that all water be "effectually filtered" from 31 December 1855. This was followed up with legislation for the mandatory inspection of water quality, including comprehensive chemical analyses, in 1858. This legislation set a worldwide precedent for similar state public health interventions across Europe. The Metropolitan Commission of Sewers was formed at the same time, water filtration was adopted throughout the country, and new water intakes on the Thames were established above Teddington Lock. Automatic pressure filters, where the water is forced under pressure through the filtration system, were innovated in 1899 in England.

==== Water chlorination ====
In what may have been one of the first attempts to use chlorine, William Soper used chlorinated lime to treat the sewage produced by typhoid patients in 1879.

In a paper published in 1894, Moritz Traube formally proposed the addition of chloride of lime (calcium hypochlorite) to water to render it "germ-free." Two other investigators confirmed Traube's findings and published their papers in 1895. Early attempts at implementing water chlorination at a water treatment plant were made in 1893 in Hamburg, Germany, and in 1897 the town of Maidstone, in Kent, England, was the first to have its entire water supply treated with chlorine.

Permanent water chlorination began in 1905, when a faulty slow sand filter and a contaminated water supply led to a serious typhoid fever epidemic in Lincoln, England. Dr. Alexander Cruickshank Houston used chlorination of the water to stem the epidemic. His installation fed a concentrated solution of chloride of lime to the water being treated. The chlorination of the water supply helped stop the epidemic and as a precaution, the chlorination was continued until 1911 when a new water supply was instituted.

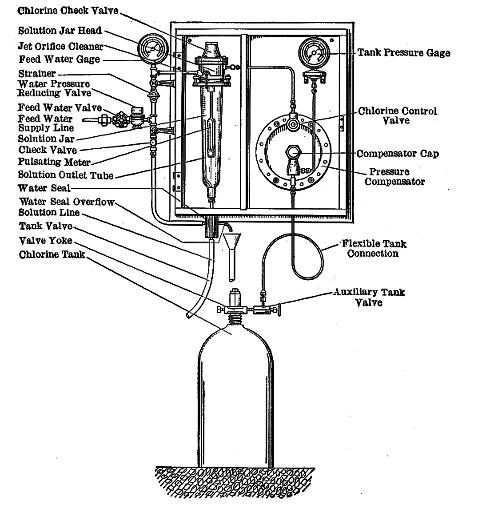
Manual Control Chlorinator for the liquefaction of chlorine for water purification, early 20th century. From Chlorination of Water by Joseph Race, 1918.

The first continuous use of chlorine in the United States for disinfection took place in 1908 at Boonton Reservoir (on the Rockaway River), which served as the supply for Jersey City, New Jersey. Chlorination was achieved by controlled additions of dilute solutions of chloride of lime (calcium hypochlorite) at doses of 0.2 to 0.35 ppm. The treatment process was conceived by Dr. John L. Leal and the chlorination plant was designed by George Warren Fuller. Over the next few years, chlorine disinfection using chloride of lime were rapidly installed in drinking water systems around the world.

The technique of purification of drinking water by use of compressed liquefied chlorine gas was developed by a British officer in the Indian Medical Service, Vincent B. Nesfield, in 1903. According to his own account, "It occurred to me that chlorine gas might be found satisfactory ... if suitable means could be found for using it.... The next important question was how to render the gas portable. This might be accomplished in two ways: By liquefying it, and storing it in lead-lined iron vessels, having a jet with a very fine capillary canal, and fitted with a tap or a screw cap. The tap is turned on, and the cylinder placed in the amount of water required. The chlorine bubbles out, and in ten to fifteen minutes the water is absolutely safe. This method would be of use on a large scale, as for service water carts."

U.S. Army Major Carl Rogers Darnall, Professor of Chemistry at the Army Medical School, gave the first practical demonstration of this in 1910. Shortly thereafter, Major William J. L. Lyster of the Army Medical Department used a solution of calcium hypochlorite in a linen bag to treat water. For many decades, Lyster's method remained the standard for U.S. ground forces in the field and in camps, implemented in the form of the familiar Lyster Bag (also spelled Lister Bag). This work became the basis for present day systems of municipal water purification.

==== Fluoridation ====
Water fluoridation is a practice adding fluoride to drinking water for the purpose of decreasing tooth decay.

The architect of these first fluoride studies was Dr. H. Trendley Dean, head of the Dental Hygiene Unit at the National Institutes of Health (NIH). Dean began investigating the epidemiology of fluorosis in 1931. By the late 1930s, he and his staff had made a critical discovery. Namely, fluoride levels of up to 1.0 ppm in drinking water did not cause enamel fluorosis in most people and only mild enamel fluorosis in a small percentage of people. This finding sent Dean's thoughts spiraling in a new direction. He recalled from reading McKay's and Black's studies on fluorosis that mottled tooth enamel is unusually resistant to decay. Dean wondered whether adding fluoride to drinking water at physically and cosmetically safe levels would help fight tooth decay. This hypothesis, Dean told his colleagues, would need to be tested. In 1944, Dean got his wish. That year, the City Commission of Grand Rapids, Michigan-after numerous discussions with researchers from the PHS, the Michigan Department of Health, and other public health organizations-voted to add fluoride to its public water supply the following year. In 1945, Grand Rapids became the first city in the world to fluoridate its drinking water. The Grand Rapids water fluoridation study was originally sponsored by the U.S. Surgeon General, but was taken over by the NIDR shortly after the institute's inception in 1948.

=== Trends ===
Sustainable Development Goal 6, formulated in 2015, includes targets on access to water supply and sanitation at a global level. In developing countries, self-supply of water and sanitation is used as an approach of incremental improvements to water and sanitation services, which are mainly financed by the user. Decentralized wastewater systems are also growing in importance to achieve sustainable sanitation.

== Understanding of health aspects ==
Original map by John Snow showing the clusters of cholera cases in the London epidemic of 1854

The Greek historian Thucydides (c. 460 – c. 400 BCE) was the first person to write, in his account of the plague of Athens, that diseases could spread from an infected person to others.

The Mosaic Law, within the first five books of the Hebrew Bible, contains the earliest recorded thoughts of contagion in the spread of disease. Specifically, it presents instructions on quarantine and washing in relation to leprosy and venereal disease.

One theory of the spread of contagious diseases that were not spread by direct contact was that they were spread by spore-like "seeds" (Latin: semina) that were present in and dispersible through the air. In his poem, De rerum natura (On the Nature of Things, c. 56 BCE), the Roman poet Lucretius (c. 99 – c. 55 BCE) stated that the world contained various "seeds", some of which could sicken a person if they were inhaled or ingested.

The Roman statesman Marcus Terentius Varro (c. 116 – c. 27 BCE) wrote, in his Rerum rusticarum libri III (Three Books on Agriculture, 36 BCE): "Precautions must also be taken in the neighborhood of swamps ... because there are bred certain minute creatures which cannot be seen by the eyes, which float in the air and enter the body through the mouth and nose and there cause serious diseases."

The Greek physician Galen (129 CE – c. 216 CE) speculated in his On Initial Causes (c. 175 CE) that some patients might have "seeds of fever". In his On the Different Types of Fever (c. 175 CE), Galen speculated that plagues were spread by "certain seeds of plague", which were present in the air. And in his Epidemics (c. 176 – c. 178 CE), Galen explained that patients might relapse during recovery from fever because some "seed of the disease" lurked in their bodies, which would cause a recurrence of the disease if the patients did not follow a physician's therapeutic regimen.

The fiqh scholar Ibn al-Haj al-Abdari (c. 1253 – 1336), while discussing Islamic diet and hygiene, gave advice and warnings about impurities that contaminate water, food, and garments, and could spread through the water supply.

Long before studies had established the germ theory of disease, or any advanced understanding of the nature of water as a vehicle for transmitting disease, traditional beliefs had cautioned against the consumption of water, rather favoring processed beverages such as beer, wine and tea. For example, in the camel caravans that crossed Central Asia along the Silk Road, the explorer Owen Lattimore noted (in 1928), "The reason we drank so much tea was because of the bad water. Water alone, unboiled, is never drunk. There is a superstition that it causes blisters on the feet."

One of the earliest understandings of waterborne diseases in Europe arose during the 19th century, when the Industrial Revolution took over Europe. Waterborne diseases, such as cholera, were once wrongly explained by the miasma theory, the theory that bad air causes the spread of diseases. However, people started to find a correlation between water quality and waterborne diseases, which led to different water purification methods, such as sand filtering and chlorinating their drinking water.

Founders of microscopy, Antonie van Leeuwenhoek and Robert Hooke, used the newly invented microscope to observe for the first time small material particles that were suspended in the water, laying the groundwork for the future understanding of waterborne pathogens and waterborne diseases.

In the 19th century, Britain was the center for rapid urbanization, and as a result, many health and sanitation problems manifested, for example cholera outbreaks and pandemics. This resulted in Britain playing a large role in the development for public health. Before discovering the link between contaminated drinking water and diseases, such as cholera and other waterborne diseases, the miasma theory was used to justify the outbreaks of these illnesses. Miasma theory is the theory that certain diseases and illnesses are the products of "bad airs". The investigations of the physician John Snow in the United Kingdom during the 1854 Broad Street cholera outbreak clarified the connections between waterborne diseases and polluted drinking water. Although the germ theory of disease had not yet been developed, Snow's observations led him to discount the prevailing miasma theory. His 1855 essay On the Mode of Communication of Cholera conclusively demonstrated the role of the water supply in spreading the cholera epidemic in Soho, with the use of a dot distribution map and statistical proof to illustrate the connection between the quality of the water source and cholera cases. During the 1854 epidemic, he collected and analyzed data establishing that people who drank water from contaminated sources such as the Broad Street pump died of cholera at much higher rates than those who got water elsewhere. His data convinced the local council to disable the water pump, which promptly ended the outbreak.

Edwin Chadwick, in particular, played a key role in Britain's sanitation movement, using the miasma theory to back up his plans for improving the sanitation situation in Britain. Although Chadwick brought contributions to developing public health in the 19th century, it was John Snow and William Budd who introduced the idea that cholera was the consequence of contaminated water, presenting the idea that diseases could be transmitted through drinking water.

People found that purifying and filtering their water improved the water quality and limited the cases of waterborne diseases. In the German town Altona this finding was first illustrated by using a sand filtering system for its water supply. A nearby town that didn't use any filtering system for their water suffered from the outbreak while Altona remained unaffected by the disease, providing evidence that the quality of water had something to do with the diseases. After this discovery, Britain and the rest of Europe took into account to filter their drinking water, as well as chlorinating them to fight off waterborne diseases like cholera.

== Related important concepts ==
- Laundry
- Night soil
- Rainwater harvesting
- Water industry

== See also ==
- Ancient water conservation techniques
  - Water supply and sanitation in the Indus-Saraswati Valley Civilisation
  - History of stepwells in Gujarat
  - Sanitation in ancient Rome
  - Traditional water sources of Persian antiquity
- List of water supply and sanitation by country
- History of water filters
- History of municipal treatment of drinking water
