= De re rustica =

De re rustica may refer to:

- De re rustica (Varro), a Latin treatise on farming, published 37 BCE
- De re rustica, a Latin treatise on farming by Columella (4 CE - 70 CE)
