= Marcellus =

Marcellus may refer to:

== People ==
- Marcellus (name)
- Marcus Claudius Marcellus, third-century BC Roman general and politician
- Marcellus of Tangier, third-century Roman centurion later venerated as a martyr-saint
- Marcellus of Ancyra, fourth-century Christian bishop and theologian
- Marcellus Empiricus, fourth- and fifth century Latin medical writer from Gaul
- Nonius Marcellus, fourth- or fifth-century Roman grammarian
- Marcellus (nephew of Augustus)
- Marcellus (magister equitum)
- Marcellus (usurper)
- Marcellus (comes excubitorum)
- Marcellus (prefect of Judea)

== Places ==
=== France ===
- Marcellus, Lot-et-Garonne, a commune

=== United States ===
- Marcellus Township, Michigan
  - Marcellus, Michigan, a village in Marcellus Township
  - Marcellus Community Schools
  - Marcellus High School (Michigan)
  - Marcellus News, a newspaper
- Marcellus, New York
  - Marcellus Central School District
  - Marcellus High School
  - Marcellus (village), New York

== Other uses ==
- Marcellus (1811 ship)
- Marcellus Formation, a mapped bedrock unit in eastern North America
- Protographium marcellus, a butterfly
- Pseudorhabdosynochus marcellus, a fish parasite
- USS Marcellus, a collier in service with the United States Navy from 1898 to 1910

== See also ==
- Marsalis (disambiguation), a family of American musicians
- Marcello
- Marcelo
- Marcel (disambiguation)
