= History of municipal treatment of drinking water =

The development of water treatment and filtration technologies went through many stages. The greatest level of change came in the 19th century as the growth of cities forced the development of new methods for distributing and treating water and the problems of water contamination became more pronounced.

== Pre-19th-century water treatment ==
Sushruta of India recommended boiling and heating water under the sun and then filtering with gravel and charcoal prior to drinking. (Sushruta Samhita, Arabic translation Kitab-i-Susrud). Early water treatment was primarily focused on the aesthetic properties of water, taste and odor. Writings from ancient Greece indicate that boiling and filtering water through charcoal were used along with exposing the water to sunlight and straining. Other cultures such as the Egyptians were using alum as a means of removing suspended particles by 1500 B.C. Medieval Venice obtained filtered water from cisterns using beds of sand.

Throughout most of human history, the primary means of acquiring untainted water was to avoid the problem and bring in water from an outside source that did not require treatment. The Romans did this with their aqueducts. London's New River was constructed, beginning in the early 17th century as a means of bringing in clean water from outside the city. The New River was slow-flowing, which helped to increase sedimentation. It also had screens installed every few miles to catch any debris and weeds. These screens required periodic maintenance and workmen were employed to clean them and cut back the weeds. The new river would meet London's needs well enough that there were few complaints before the 19th century, although the water supplied was rarely used for drinking directly, rather it was more likely used for washing or the brewing of beer.

== The growing need for filtration and treatment ==
By the beginning of the 19th century filtration became a means of removing debris from the water. Paisley, Scotland, became the first city to use a filter, designed by John Gibb, to supply a city with water. London would follow up on Scotland's initial filter with one of its own at Chelsea in 1828. The Chelsea filter was a slow sand filter which consisted of a two-foot layer of sand with layers of shells gravel and bricks beneath. The Chelsea filter was capable of clearing 95 percent of impurities from the water. It was unknown at the time of its construction but this filter also functioned as biological filter due to bacteria present in the bed. The Bacteriology of cities waste water would not be understood until the end of the 19th century.

The benefits of filtration were not obvious at the time, and adoption of filters was slow. Berlin would install filters in 1856 and other European cities would follow. In America the need for filtration was not readily apparent. The city of Richmond, Virginia attempted to install a slow sand filter in 1832 but the filter did not operate properly. Other American cities considered installing filters but deemed them too expensive at the time.

== Increased contamination of water ==
A tipping point came in the early 19th century that required attention to be paid to water treatment. The water closet (toilet), an improved version of which was introduced by John Bramah in the 1770s began to grow in popularity. By the 1830s the water closet was widely used in London. Household drains could not be connected to the city's sewers, but after 1815 this prohibition was lifted. Water closets could now empty into the cities sewer which in turn emptied into the Thames. This was a disaster for the river. In 1816 salmon could be caught in the Thames, four years later none could be caught. The water closet overloaded the medieval cesspool system which was still in use. The use of water to dispose of sewage in the water closets filed the cesspools ten to twenty times quicker. Cesspools before this had received mostly solid waste. The rapid filling caused seepage. By 1844 the Metropolitan Buildings act simply required new buildings to be connected to street sewers. The tidal nature of the Thames did not help the matter.

A similar situation was occurring in the US. Water consumption was increasing, for example in Chicago the per capita water consumption was 33 gallons per day in 1856 to 144 gallons in 1882 (although this figure also includes industrial sources). This increased water consumption and the growing use of water closets overloaded the existing cesspool system and served to contaminate the surrounding soil and watercourses.

== Disease ==
An increase in the awareness of the transmission of diseases such as cholera, typhoid and yellow fever in the 19th century manifested in a growing need to filter and treat municipal drinking water. The growth of cities and the contamination of nearby water sources by sewage and industrial waste led to an increasing demand for treatment.

The understanding of how disease was transmitted was still developing. The miasmatic theory advocated that disease was transmitted by smell and foul odors arising from putrefaction of organic matter. This was advocated by early sanitarian Edwin Chadwick, who in the 1840s, advocated the removal of human waste by means of water. The idea was to remove the foul smells as quickly as possible, by means of water ideally to be deposited on agricultural fields. The sewage was instead deposited in the Thames of which many water suppliers still used as their source. In this environment John Snow established a series of experiments where he was able to show that cholera was communicable by water and was able to link a cholera outbreak in London to a single well in London on Broad Street. The link between water and disease was still not well established and in 1873 the president of the New York board of health declared that "although rivers are great natural sewers, and receive the drainage of towns and cities the natural process of purification, in most cases destroys the offensive bodies derived from sewer and renders them harmless". This is typical of the lack of understanding of how disease was transmitted and followed the general belief that water courses such as rivers and lakes were great sinks for purification of contaminated water.

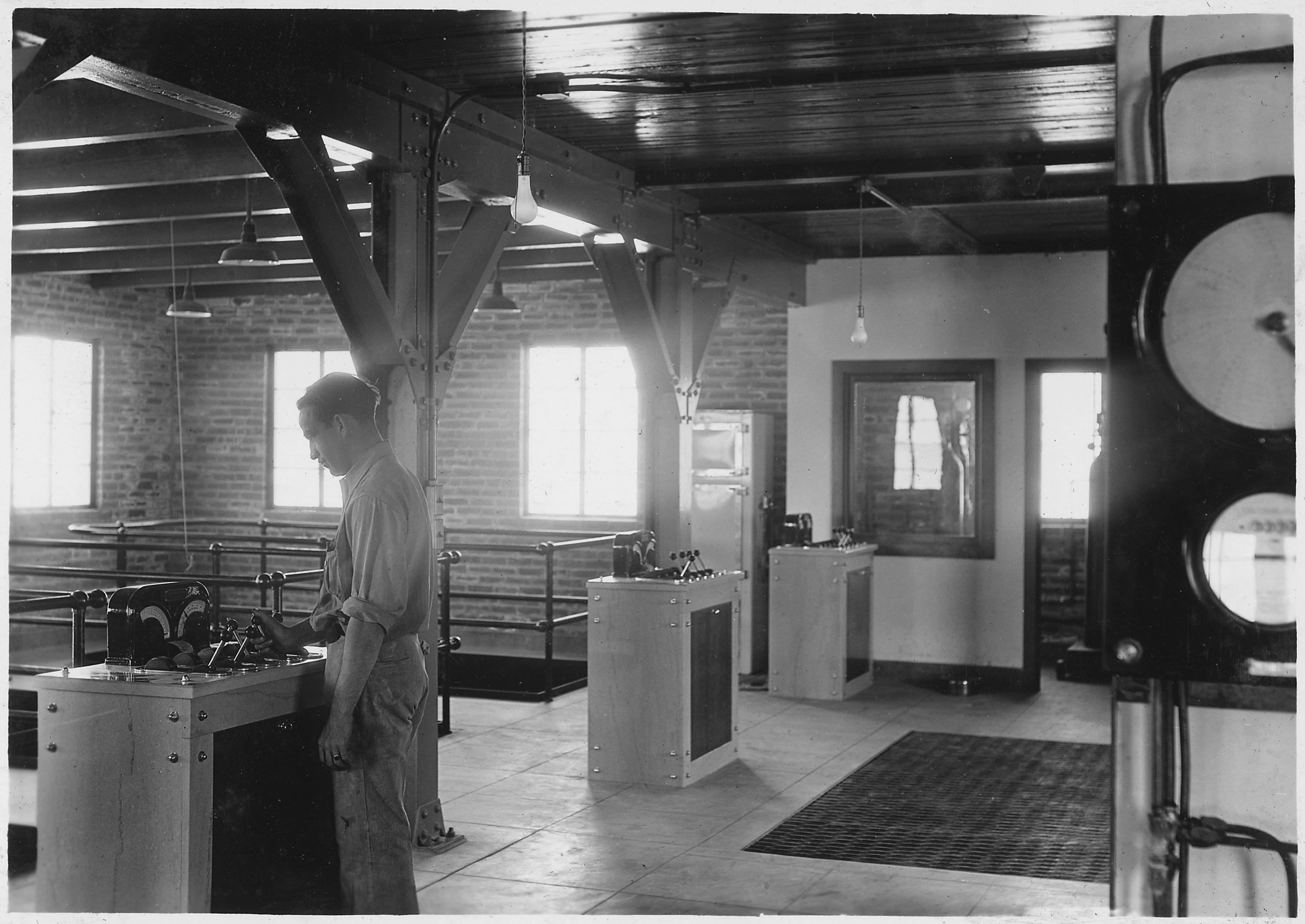
"Interior of treating and filtration plant, Boulder City, NV circa 1932. Rapid sand filters and controls on the left." National Archives, 293652.

As understanding of the bacteriological nature of disease became clearer in the late 19th century the need to filter and treat water became apparent. In Lowell, MA after a typhoid outbreak in 1890 William Thompson Sedgwick applied bacteriological methods to the investigation and was able to establish a link between contaminated water and the disease. The United States by this time had begun to introduce filtration into its municipal water supplies as a means of removing sediment form water in the 1870s through 90s. The United States also introduced the rapid sand filter which were a derivation of filters used in the paper making industry. The rapid filters and the slow sand filters engaged in competition as to which technology was superior. By the beginning of the 20th century, an increased knowledge in bacteriology led to improvements in the slow sand filters as well as the design of rapid filters. It soon became apparent that slow sand filters could remove typhoid germs.

Treatment, as well as filtration, began to be used in the early 20th century. Water chlorination as a means of treatment began to be used in the late 19th century. Bleaching powder was the first material used for chlorination. Middelkerke, Belgium, would become the first city to chlorinate its water, in 1902, and Jersey City, New Jersey, became the first in city in the United States to do so, in 1909. Filtration alone was coincidentally able to prevent many cases of typhoid, although filtration's primary purpose was reducing turbidity of the water. General concern about doping the water with chemicals led to some debate on the merits of chlorination. On January 14, 1916, the chlorination equipment in Milwaukee, Wisconsin, ceased functioning for 7 hours. In that time the water pumped from Lake Michigan caused 25,000 to 100,000 cases of diarrhea as well as 500 cases of typhoid fever, with 60 deaths. By this point the need for treatment was becoming clear.

== Regulation in the United States ==
In early US history, drinking water quality in the country was managed by individual drinking water utilities and at the state and local level. In 1914 the U.S. Public Health Service (PHS) published a set of drinking water standards, pursuant to existing federal authority to regulate interstate commerce, and in response to the 1893 Interstate Quarantine Act. As such the standards were directly applicable only to interstate common carriers such as railroads. For local drinking water utilities, these standards were basically recommendations and not enforceable requirements. However, many municipal utilities began to voluntarily adopt the standards.

Ultimately the PHS standards were adopted and expanded as national drinking water standards after passage of the 1974 Safe Drinking Water Act (SDWA), and U.S. water quality became subject to a whole new generation of federal standards.

The U.S. Environmental Protection Agency (EPA) publishes national drinking water standards, which are mainly enforced by state health agencies.

== See also ==
- History of water supply and sanitation
- Waste management#United States
