= Marcus Terentius Varro =

Roman polymath and author (116–27 BC)

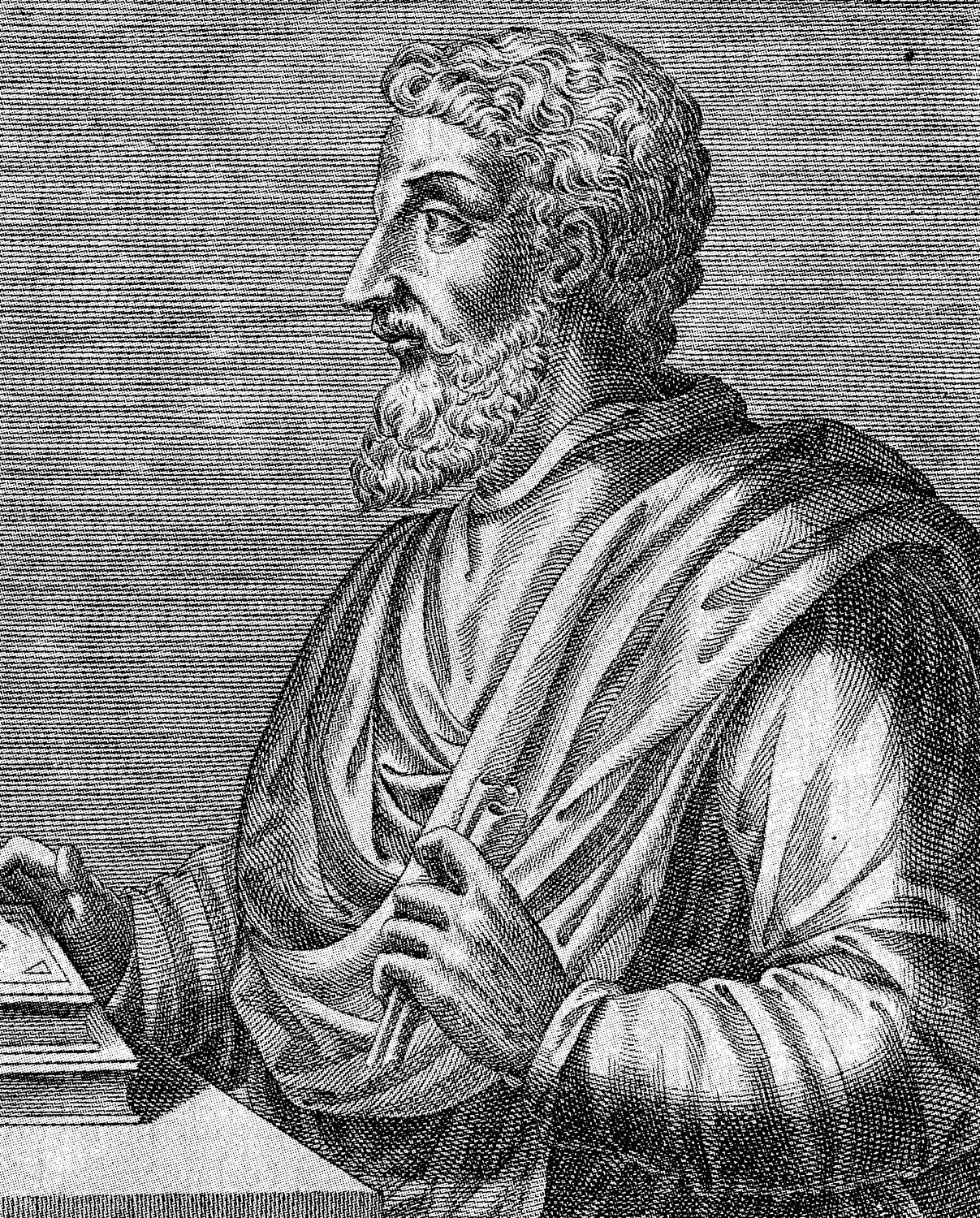
An imagined portrait of an elderly Varro, engraving from André Thevet, Les Vrais pourtraits et vies des hommes illustres grecz, latins et payens (1584).

Marcus Terentius Varro (116–27 BC) was a Roman polymath and a prolific author. He is regarded as ancient Rome's greatest scholar, and was described by Petrarch as "the third great light of Rome" (after Virgil and Cicero). He is sometimes called Varro Reatinus ("Varro of Rieti") to distinguish him from his younger contemporary Varro Atacinus ("Varro of Atax").

== Biography ==
Varro was born in or near Reate (modern Rieti in Lazio) into a family thought to be of equestrian rank. He always remained close to his roots in the area, owning a large farm in the Reatine plain (reported as near Lago di Ripasottile,) until his old age. He supported Pompey, reaching the office of praetor, after having served as tribune of the people, quaestor and curule aedile. It is probable that Varro was discontented with the course on which Pompey entered when the First Triumvirate formed c. 60 BC, and he may thus have lost his chance of rising to the consulship. He actually ridiculed the coalition in a work entitled the Three-Headed Monster (Τρικάρανος in the Greek of Appian, The Civil Wars, II.ii.9). He was one of the commission of twenty that carried out the great agrarian scheme of Caesar for the resettlement of Capua and Campania (59 BC).

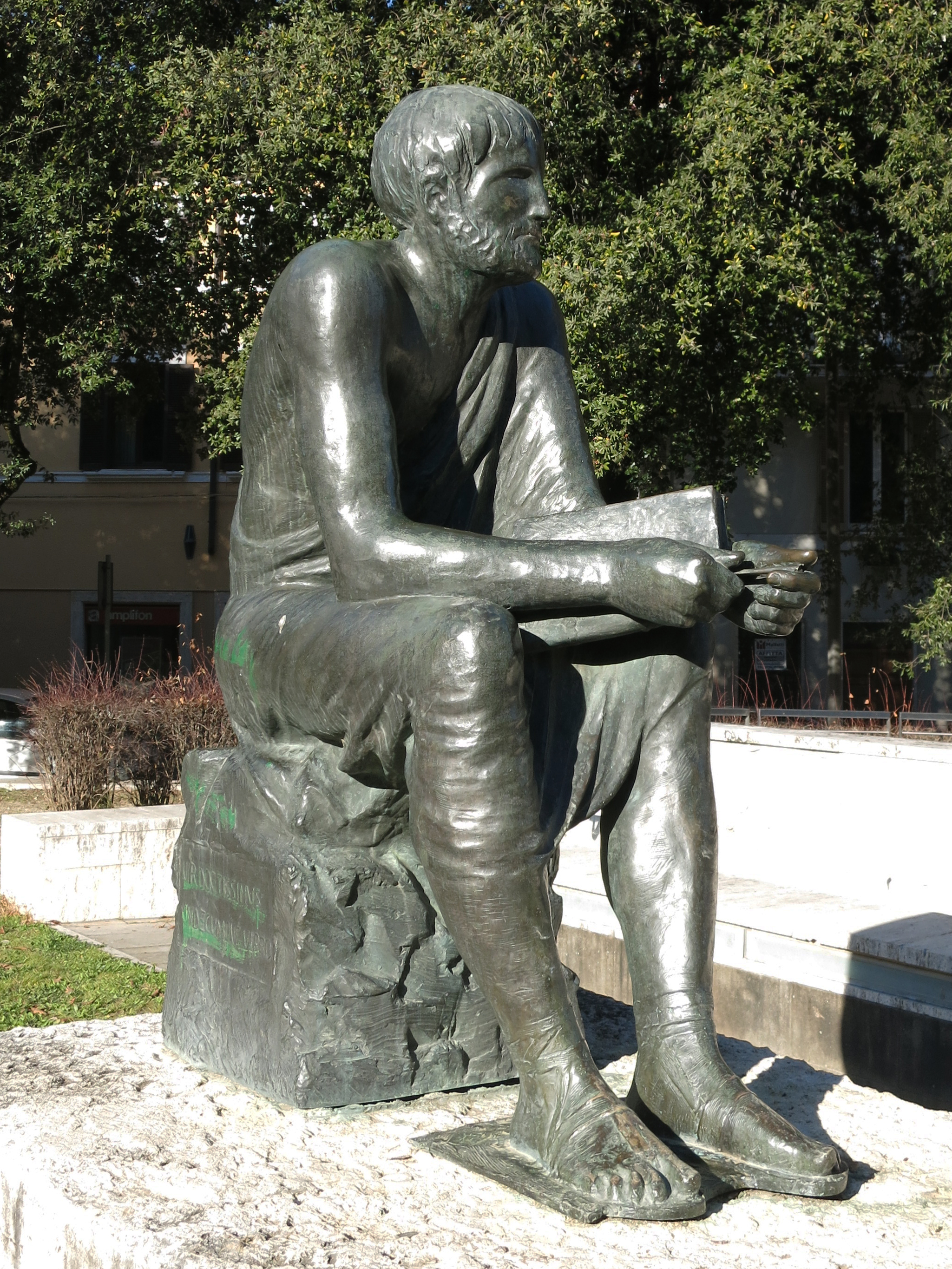
Statue of Marcus Terentius Varro by local artist Dino Morsani in Rieti

During Caesar's civil war of 49 to 45 he commanded one of Pompey's armies in the Ilerda campaign of 49 BC. He escaped the penalties of having backed the losing side in the civil war through two pardons granted by Julius Caesar, before and after the 48 BC Battle of Pharsalus. Caesar appointed him to oversee the public library of Rome in 47 BC, but following Caesar's death Mark Antony proscribed him, resulting in his losing much of his property, including his library. As the Republic gave way to the Empire c. 27 BC, Varro gained the favour of Augustus, under whose protection he found the security and quiet to devote himself to study and writing.

Varro had studied under the Roman philologist Lucius Aelius Stilo (died 74 BC), and later at Athens under the Academic philosopher Antiochus of Ascalon (died 68 BC). Varro proved a highly productive writer and turned out more than 74 Latin works on a variety of topics. Aside from his many lost works (known through fragments), two endeavors stand out for historians: Nine Books of Disciplines and his compilation of the Varronian chronology. His Nine Books of Disciplines became a model for later encyclopedists, especially for Pliny the Elder (c. 23 to 79 AD). The most noteworthy portion of the Nine Books of Disciplines is its use of the liberal arts as organizing principles. Varro decided to focus on identifying nine of these arts: grammar, rhetoric, logic, arithmetic, geometry, astronomy, musical theory, medicine, and architecture. Using Varro's list, mediated through Martianus Capella's early-5th century allegory, subsequent writers defined the seven classical "liberal arts" of the medieval schools.

In c. 37 BC, in his old age, Varro wrote on agriculture for his wife Fundania, producing a "voluminous" work De re rustica (also called Res rusticae)—similar to Cato the Elder's work De agri cultura—on the management of large slave-run estates.

== Calendars ==
Fasti Antiates Maiores, an inscription containing the Roman calendar. This calendar predates the Julian reform of the calendar; it contains the months Quintilis and Sextilis, and allows for the insertion of an intercalary month

The compilation of the Varronian chronology was an attempt to determine an exact year-by-year timeline of Roman history up to his time. It is based on the traditional sequence of the consuls of the Roman Republic—supplemented, where necessary, by inserting "dictatorial" and "anarchic" years. It has been demonstrated to be somewhat erroneous but has become the widely accepted standard chronology, in large part because it was inscribed on the arch of Augustus in Rome; though that arch no longer stands, a large portion of the chronology has survived under the name of Fasti Capitolini.

== Works ==
Varro's literary output was prolific; Ritschl estimated it at 74 works in some 620 books, of which only one work survives complete, although many fragments of the others survive, mostly in Gellius's Attic Nights. He was called "the most learned of the Romans" by Quintilian, and also recognized by Plutarch as "a man deeply read in Roman history".

Varro was recognized as an important source by many other ancient authors, among them Cicero, Pliny the Elder, Virgil in the Georgics, Columella, Aulus Gellius, Macrobius, Augustine, and Vitruvius, who credits him (VII.Intr.14) with a book on architecture.

His only complete work extant, Rerum rusticarum libri tres ("Three Books on Agriculture"), has been described as "the well digested system of an experienced and successful farmer who has seen and practised all that he records."

One noteworthy aspect of the work is his anticipation of microbiology and epidemiology. Varro warned his readers to avoid swamps and marshland, since in such areas

... there are bred certain minute creatures which cannot be seen by the eyes, but which float in the air and enter the body through the mouth and nose and cause serious diseases.

Varro is considered, alongside the later Numenius and Porphyry, an example of pagan thinkers who held appreciative views on Judaism. He wrote that Roman religion would have been more devout had it followed the Jews' aniconic worship, and held that Jupiter and the God of the Jews were one deity under different names.

All of the manuscripts of Cato's treatise De agri cultura also include a copy of Varro's De re rustica. J. G. Schneider and Heinrich Keil showed that the existing manuscripts directly or indirectly descend from a long-lost manuscript called the Marcianus, which was once in the Biblioteca Marciana in Venice and described by Petrus Victorinus as liber antiquissimus et fidelissimus (lit. 'a book most ancient and faithful'). The oldest existing manuscript is the Codex Parisinus 6842, written in Italy at some point before the end of the 12th century. The editio princeps was printed at Venice in 1472; Angelo Politian's collation of the Marcianus against his copy of this first printing is considered an important witness for the text.

A modern scholar, Bertha Tilly, assesses Varro's work as follows:

For the immense mass of work completed, for his patriotic fervour, his high moral sentiments, for versatility in forms of writing and in subjects, for the vast range of material, Varro towers above all his contemporaries and his successors: he was distinguished for learning as no other man had ever been or was to be.

=== Extant works ===
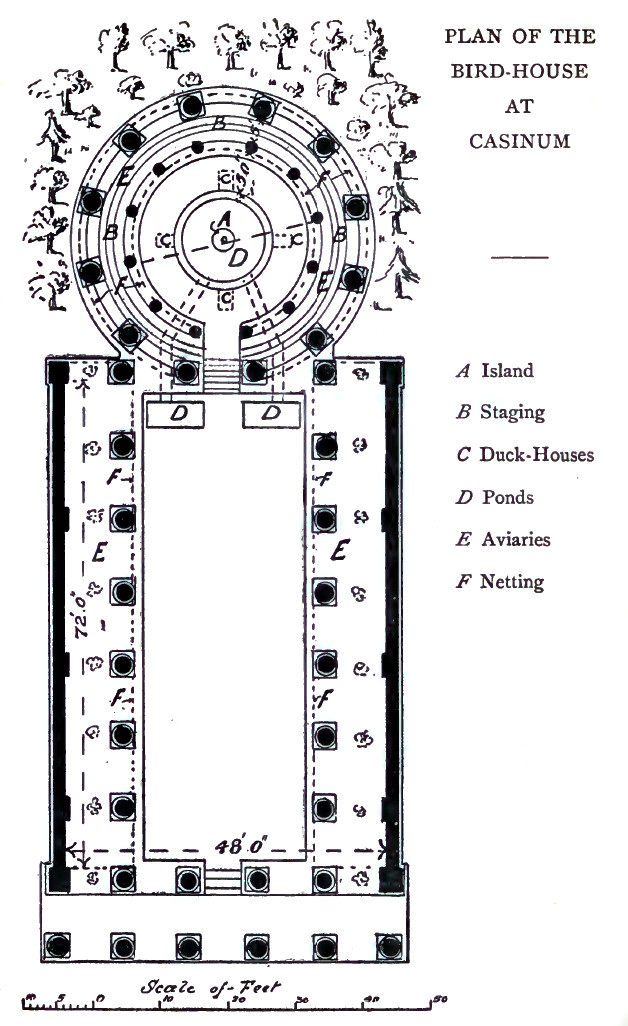
Plan of the birdhouse at Casinum designed and built by Varro

- De lingua latina libri XXV (or On the Latin Language in 25 Books, of which six books (V–X) survive, partly mutilated)
- Rerum rusticarum libri III (or Three Books of Rural Topics), also known as the De re rustica ("On Agriculture") or Res rusticae ("Agriculture")

=== Known lost works ===
- Saturarum Menippearum libri CL or Menippean Satires in 150 books
- Antiquitates rerum humanarum et divinarum libri XLI (Antiquities of Human and Divine Things)
- Logistoricon libri LXXVI
- Hebdomades vel de imaginibus
- Disciplinarum libri IX (An encyclopedia on the liberal arts, of which the first book dealt with grammar)
- De rebus urbanis libri III (or On Urban Topics in Three Books)
- De gente populi Romani libri IIII (cf. Augustine, 'De civitate dei' xxi. 8.)
- De sua vita libri III (or On His Own Life in Three Books)
- De familiis troianis (or On the Families of Troy)
- De Antiquitate Litterarum libri II (addressed to the tragic poet Lucius Accius; it is therefore one of his earliest writings)
- De Origine Linguae Latinae libri III (addressed to Pompey; cf. Augustine, 'De civitate dei' xxii. 28.)
- Περί Χαρακτήρων (in at least three books, on the formation of words)
- Quaestiones Plautinae libri V (containing interpretations of rare words found in the comedies of Plautus)
- De Similitudine Verborum libri III (on regularity in forms and words)
- De Utilitate Sermonis libri IIII (on the principle of anomaly or irregularity)
- De Sermone Latino libri V (?) (addressed to Marcellus, (Note: Several people called Marcellus lived during Varro's time. The identity of this one is unclear.) on orthography and the metres of poetry)
- De philosophia (cf. Augustine, 'De civitate dei' xix. 1.)
- De Bibliothecis (in three books)

Most of the extant fragments of these works (mostly the grammatical works) can be found in the Goetz–Schoell edition of De Lingua Latina, pp. 199–242; in the collection of Wilmanns, pp. 170–223; and in that of Funaioli, pp. 179–371.

== Bibliography ==
- Cardauns, B. Marcus Terentius Varro: Einführung in sein Werk. Heidelberger Studienhefte zur Altertumswissenschaft. Heidelberg, Germany: C. Winter, 2001.
- d'Alessandro, P. "Varrone e la tradizione metrica antica". Spudasmata, volume 143. Hildesheim; Zürich; New York: Georg Olms Verlag, 2012.
- Dahlmann, H. M. "Terentius Varro. Paulys Realencyclopädie der classischen Altertumswissenschaft". Supplement 6, Abretten bis Thunudromon. Edited by Wilhelm Kroll, 1172–1277. Stuttgart: Metzler, 1935.
- Ferriss-Hill, J. "Varro's Intuition of Cognate Relationships". Illinois Classical Studies, volume 39, 2014, pp. 81–108.
- Freudenburg, K. "The Afterlife of Varro in Horace's Sermones: Generic Issues in Roman Satire." Generic Interfaces in Latin Literature: Encounters, Interactions and Transformations, edited by Stavros Frangoulidis, De Gruyter, 2013, pp. 297–336.
- Kronenberg, L. Allegories of Farming from Greece and Rome: Philosophical Satire in Xenophon, Varro and Virgil. Cambridge/New York: Cambridge University Press, 2009.
- Nelsestuen, G. Varro the Agronomist: Political Philosophy, Satire, and Agriculture in the Late Republic. Columbus: Ohio State University Press, 2015.
- Richardson, J. S. "The Triumph of Metellus Scipio and the Dramatic Date of Varro, RR 3". The Classical Quarterly, volume 33, no. 2, 1983, pp. 456–463.
- Taylor, D. J.. Declinatio : A Study of the Linguistic Theory of Marcus Terentius Varro. Amsterdam: John Benjamins Publishing Company, 1974.
- Van Nuffelen, P. "Varro's Divine Antiquities: Roman Religion as an Image of Truth". Classical Philology, volume 105, no. 2, 2010, pp. 162–188.
