= Marcellus High School =

Location
- 1 Mustang Hill; Marcellus, New York 13108; United States; 42.991°N 76.340°W

Information
- Type: Public
- School district: Marcellus Central School District
- Superintendent: Michelle Brantner
- NCES School ID: 361848001665
- Principal: Brian Sevey
- Teaching staff: 42.44 (on an FTE basis)
- Grades: 9-12
- Enrollment: 453 (2023-2024)
- Student to teacher ratio: 10.67
- Campus: Rural
- Colors: Green, Black, Red and White
- Mascot: Mustangs
- Yearbook: Marcellian
- Website: www.marcellusschools.org

Marcellus High School is a public high school in Onondaga County, New York, United States. It is located in Marcellus, New York on the same campus as Marcellus Central School District's middle and elementary schools. Approximately 700 students attend the high school with over 65 teachers and staff members.

== Student activities ==
- All School Show (Musical)
- Fall Show (Play)
- Chess Club
- Class Government/Student Council
- Character Education Committee
- National Honor Society
- French Honor Society
- Mock Trial
- Teen Institute
- Yearbook
- Intramural Sports
- SADD (Students Against Destructive Decisions)
- Ski Club
- Science Olympiad
- Math League
- Book Club
- Lit Mag
- Outdoor Club
- Concert and Symphonic Band
- Concert and Select Choir
- Tap Dancing Club
- Esports Club

== Athletics ==
=== Fall ===
- Football
- Boys Soccer
- Girls Soccer
- Boys Cross Country
- Girls Cross Country
- Girls Tennis
- Women's Volleyball

=== Winter ===
- Wrestling
- Boys Basketball
- Girls Basketball
- Volleyball
- Indoor Track

=== Spring ===
- Boys Tennis
- Boys Lacrosse
- Girls Lacrosse
- Baseball
- Softball
- Boys Track & Field
- Girls Track & Field
- Boys Golf
- Girls Golf

== Courses ==
There are many courses offered at the high school with the option of doing other programs off-site. Some courses are offered through colleges/universities for dual credit. Some Advanced Placement (AP) courses are offered. Language courses include Spanish and French.
