= Marcellus Central School District =

School district in the U.S. state of New York

Marcellus Central School District is a school district in Marcellus, New York. It consists of Marcellus High School, C.S. Driver Middle School, and K.C. Heffernan Elementary school. The district was established in 1933.

As of 2023, the superintendent was Jean Sharlow.

== Budgets ==
The district was allowed to issue bonds by state law in 1979, due to overestimated anticipated revenues and surpluses. To get the bill through the legislature, it took several motions.

Like many other school districts, Marcellus Central must normally put its budget up for a public vote.

The district's use in the 2010s of "cohort survival" for enrollment management and budgeting is considered "a good tool".

In 2024, the District was set to receive $14 million in low-interest loans from the New York State Dormitory Authority, earmarked for "upgrades and renovations".

== See also ==
- Education in New York
