= Piero Vettori =

Italian writer, philologist and humanist

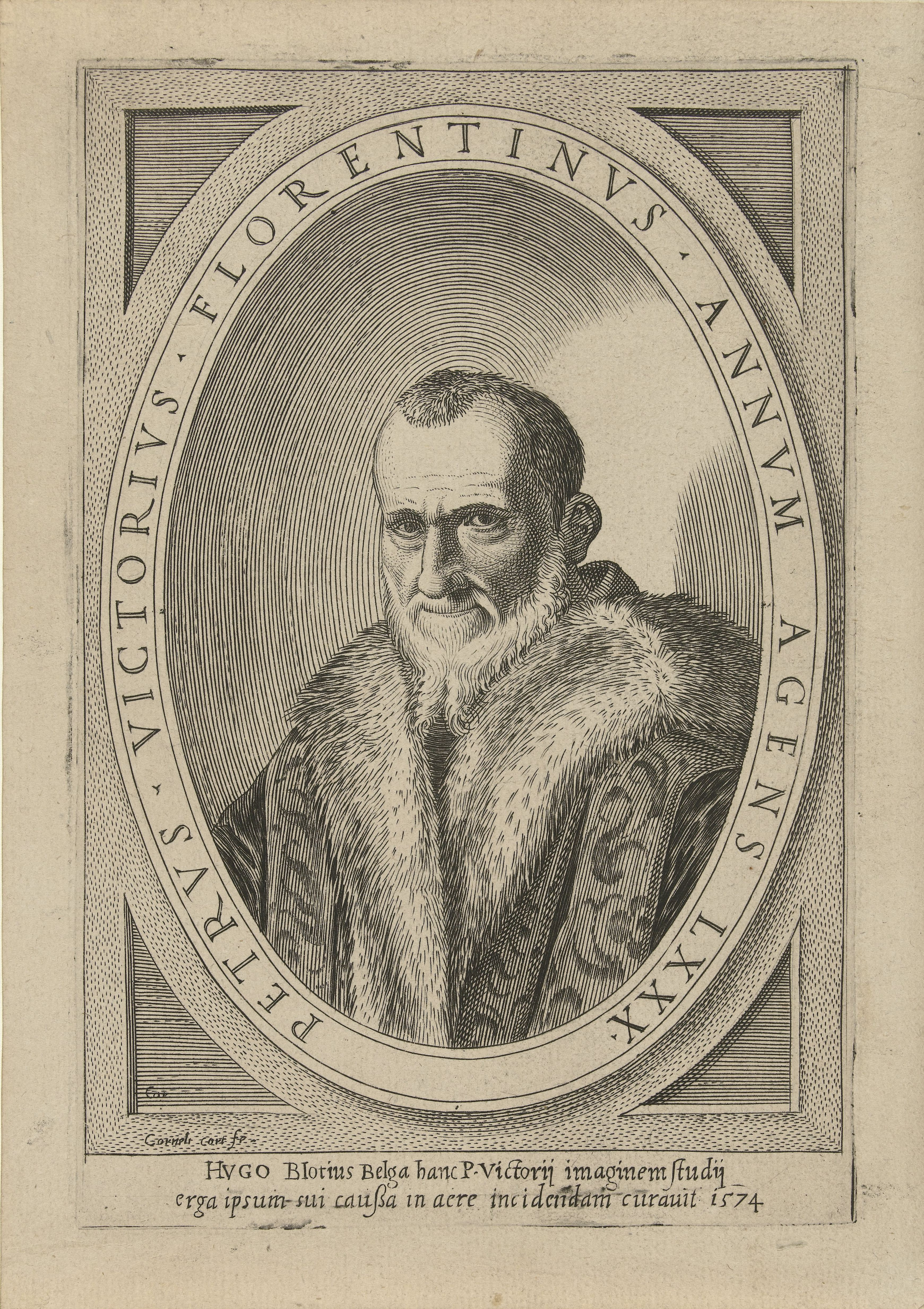
Pietro Vettori (1574)

Piero or Pietro Vettori (Latin: Petrus Victorius) (1499 – 8 December 1585) was an Italian writer, philologist and humanist.

== Life ==
Vettori was born in Florence and in his life dealt with numerous matters, from agriculture to sciences, from rhetorics to moral philosophy, and also catalogued codexes in Florence and Italy. However his main interest was the study of ancient classics, especially Greek texts.

In 1522 he traveled to Spain with his cousin Paolo Vettori, naval commander of the Papal States, and there he collected numerous ancient inscriptions which, once back to Florence, he tried to interpret. An adversary of the House of Medici, after the death of the Republic and the establishment of the Duchy of Florence in 1530, Vettori retired to San Casciano Val di Pesa, where he wrote the Trattato delle lodi et della coltivazione de gli ulivi ("Treatise on the praise and the cultivation of olive trees").

Despite previously having been a critic of Medici rule over Florence, in 1538 Duke Cosimo I de' Medici offered him a position as professor of Greek and Latin in the Studio Fiorentino, where he taught until 1583.

He died in Florence in 1585.

== Works ==
His other works include the Castigationes (commentaries) of Cicero's family letter, and editions of works by Varro, Cato, Aeschylus, Sallust, Aristotle, Euripides's Electra and others.

His edition of Aeschylus (1557) was the first printed edition to include the whole of the Agamemnon, as the earlier editors of Aeschylus Francesco Robortello and Adrianus Turnebus had only had lines 1-310 and 1067-1159 available to them. Vettori made very few textual conjectures in this edition, but Henricus Stephanus, who printed it, added an appendix with some further corrections.

He also edited the works of his friend Giovanni della Casa after the latter's death.

In 1553 he published the first 25 books of the Variarum lectionum, followed by another thirteen in 1569 and republished integrally in 1582.

== Sources ==
- Lo Re, Salvatore (2006). "La crisi della libertà fiorentina: alle origine della formazione politica e intellettuale di Benedetto Varchi e Piero Vettori". Studi e testi del Rinascimento europeo (29)). Rome: Istituto nazionale di studi sul Rinascimento.
