= De re rustica (Varro) =

Book by Marcus Terentius Varro

De re rustica, also known as Res rusticae, Rerum rusticarum libri tres, and On Agriculture, is a work consisting of 3 books about the management of large slave-run estates and general agriculture by Varro. It was published in c. 37 BC, and was written by Varro when he was 80 years old.

Varro was regarded as a prolific and learned writer, publishing works on a variety of topics including architecture, Roman history, liberal arts, poetry, grammar, humor, and agriculture.

== Summary ==
The work consists of 3 books, each addressing aspects of managing a farm. Book I focuses on general agriculture, Book II on domestic cattle, and Book III on other farm stock such as poultry and bees.

Book I discusses the types of soil and land, where to situate a farm, what to plant, when to harvest, and practical tips on how to manage a farm. There are references to Cato's work De agri cultura throughout.

Book II covers the care of domestic cattle, a term in modern times understood to refer to cows; Varro groups pigs, sheep, cows, horses, dogs, and other large animals under the category of cattle. Instruction is given as to the breeding, feeding, keeping, pasturing, and buying of these cattle.

Book III is about the care of smaller animals on a farm, including bees, fish, peafowl, ortlans, buntings, blackbirds, geese, ducks, chickens, turtledoves, hares, snails, and dormice. Throughout all 3 books, Varro frequently discusses the etymology of various words.

== Style ==
The style of this work is practical and straightforward. It is systemically arranged by topic, with lucid, straightforward prose. It is considered "inferior" to the similar but more voluminous work De re rustica by Columella, yet still regarded as a treatise of immense practical value that was quoted by later authors including Virgil and Pliny the Elder.

== Manuscripts ==
De re rustica is inextricably tied to Cato the Elder's work De agri cultura. All of the manuscripts of Cato's treatise include a copy of De re rustica. J.G. Schneider and Heinrich Keil, a scholar of ancient language, showed that the existing manuscripts directly or indirectly descend from a long-lost manuscript called the Marcianus, which was once in the Biblioteca Marciana in Venice and described by Petrus Victorinus as liber antiquissimus et fidelissimus (lit. 'a book most ancient and faithful'). The oldest existing manuscript is the Codex Parisinus 6842, written in Italy at some point before the end of the 12th century. The editio princeps was printed at Venice in 1472; Angelo Politian's collation of the Marcianus against his copy of this first printing is considered an important witness for the text.

== Editions ==
- Hooper, William Davis; Ash, Harrison Boyd (1934). Cato and Varro on Agriculture. Harvard University Press: Loeb Classical Library. ISBN 9780674993136.
- Flach, Dieter (1996–2002). Marcus Terentius Varro, Gespräche über die Landwirtschaft). 3 volumes. Darmstadt: WBG (critical edition, German translation and commentary).
- Flach, Dieter (2006). Marcus Terentius Varro, Über die Landwirtschaft. Darmstadt: WBG (completely revised version of Flach's edition and translation in one volume without the commentary).

== See also ==
- Columella
- De agri cultura
