= Crossness =

Coordinates: 51.508288°N 0.138295°E

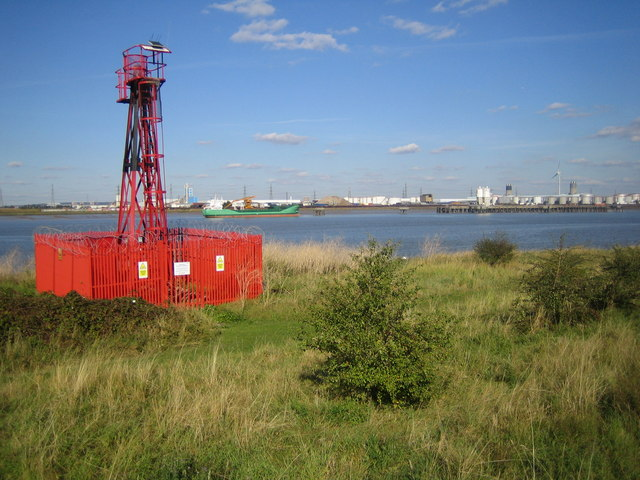
- Crossness lighthouse, built 1895 by Trinity House, now operated by the Port of London Authority.

- Location within Greater London
- London borough: Bexley
- Ceremonial county: Greater London
- Region: London
- Country: England
- Sovereign state: United Kingdom
- Dialling code: 020
- Police: Metropolitan
- Fire: London
- Ambulance: London
- London Assembly: Bexley and Bromley

Crossness is a location in the London Borough of Bexley, close to the southern bank of the River Thames, to the east of Thamesmead, west of Belvedere and north-west of Erith. The place takes its name from Cross Ness, a specific promontory on the southern bank of the River Thames. In maritime terms, the tip of Cross Ness, in the past referred to as 'Leather Bottle Point', marks the boundary between Barking Reach and Halfway Reach. An unmanned lighthouse on Crossness is a navigational aid to shipping.

== Sewer ==
Crossness is the location of the Crossness Sewage Treatment Works, which includes the historic Victorian Crossness Pumping Station, built at the eastern end of the Southern Outfall Sewer as part of the London sewerage system designed by Sir Joseph Bazalgette and constructed between 1859 and 1865.

== Lighthouse ==
Crossness lighthouse is a steel lattice structure. The light is at an elevation of 41 feet (12.5 m) and gives a white 5-second flash visible for 8 miles (12.9 km). In 2024, the Port of London Authority consulted on replacement of the lattice structure with a light on a drop-down mast.

== Access and recreation ==
Crossness Nature Reserve is east of the sewage works.

The Ridgeway path, owned by Thames Water and built on top of the southern outfall sewer, stretches 3.5 miles (5.6 km) between Plumstead railway station and the Crossness sewage treatment works. The nearest station to Crossness is Abbey Wood, almost 2 miles (3.2 km) away.

The Thames Path Extension - from the Thames Barrier to Crayford Ness - runs along the southern bank of the river through Crossness.

== See also ==
- Northern Outfall Sewer
- Beckton Sewage Treatment Works
- Mogden Sewage Treatment Works
- Riverside Sewage Treatment Works, Rainham
