= Old Ford Island =

Nature reserve in the London Borough of Newham

Coordinates: 51.5364°N 0.02032°W

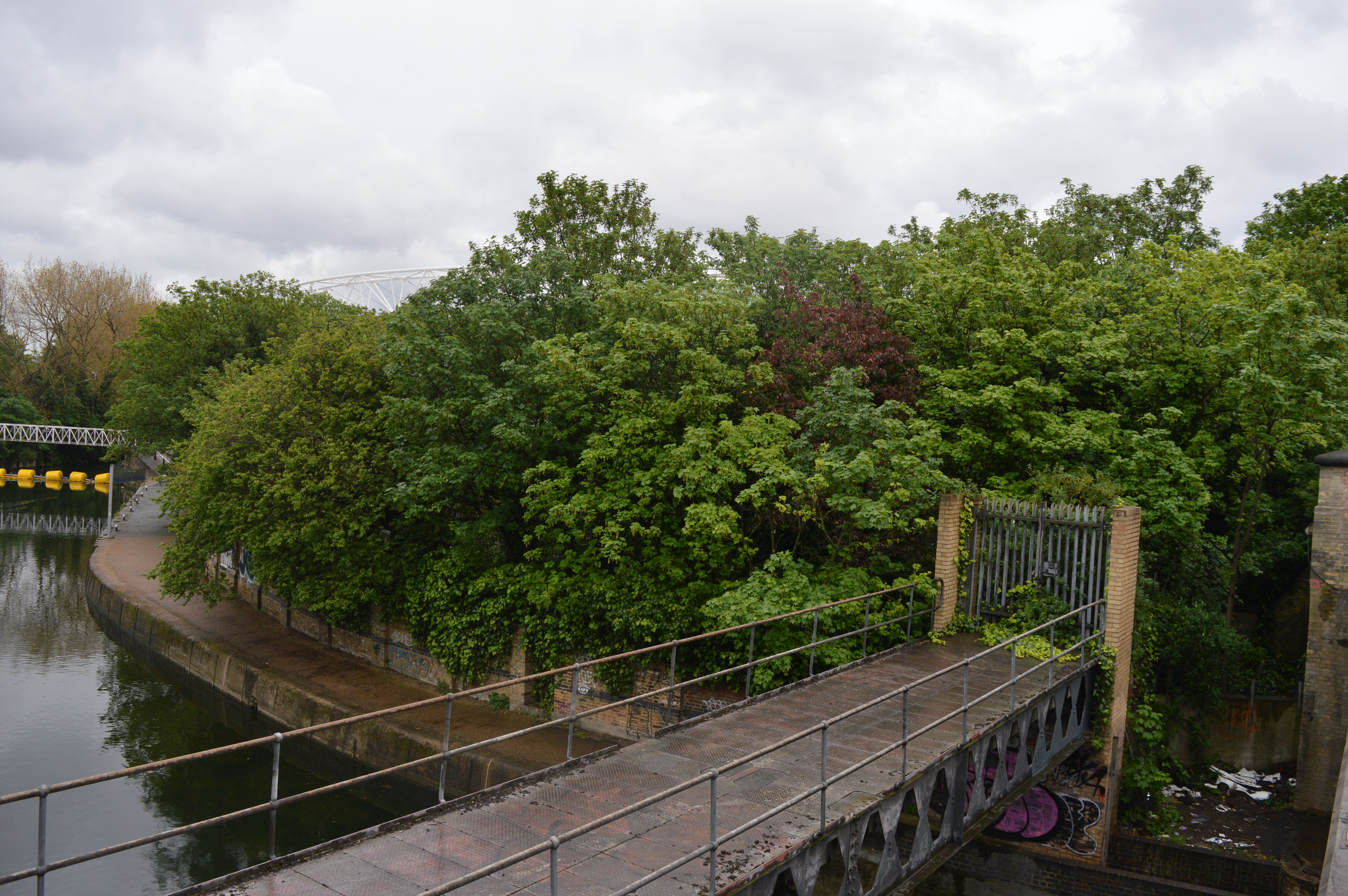
A bridge leading to the island

Old Ford Island is a nature reserve within the Queen Elizabeth Olympic Park in the London Borough of Newham.

This site has woodland, meadow, tall herbs and scrub. It has a variety of breeding birds and is important for butterflies, including the small heath, small copper, wall and common blue.

The nature reserve is owned by Thames Water and is the site of the Old Ford Water Recycling Plant, which takes wastewater from the Northern Outfall Sewer and recycles it into non-potable water for use in flushing toilets and irrigation within the Olympic Park. It is private land with no public access.
