= Southern Outfall Sewer =

London sewer

Coordinates: 51°30.3′N 0°8.4′E

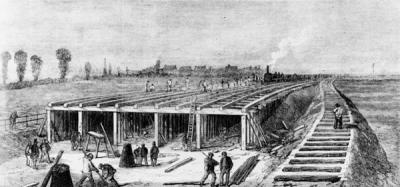
Bazalgette's Northern Outfall Sewer under construction

The Southern Outfall Sewer is a major sanitary sewer taking sewage from the southern area of central London to Crossness in south-east London. Flows from three interceptory sewers combine at Greenwich pumping station and then run under Greenwich, Woolwich, Plumstead and across Erith Marshes. The Outfall Sewer was designed by Joseph Bazalgette after an outbreak of cholera in 1853 and the Great Stink of 1858.

== History ==
By 1859, the Metropolitan Board of Works had been set up and taken over the work of the Metropolitan Commission of Sewers. The board issued tenders for the construction works and the contract for the Southern outfall was let to Rowland Brotherhood.

Work started on the southern outfall sewer in 1860 and it was finally opened on 4 April 1865 by H.R.H. the Prince of Wales.

Until this time, central London's drains were built primarily to cope with rainwater, and the growing use of flush toilets frequently meant these became overloaded, flushing mud, shingle, sewage and industrial effluent into the River Thames. Bazalgette's London sewerage system project included the construction of intercepting sewers north and south of the Thames; the Northern Outfall Sewer diverts flows away from the Thames north of the river.

== Route ==
South of the river, three major interceptor sewers were constructed:

- The high-level sewer starts at Herne Hill, and heads eastward under Peckham and New Cross to a pumping station at Deptford.
- The middle-level sewer starts on Balham Hill and runs under Clapham High Street, under Stockwell and Brixton, through Camberwell to Deptford.
- The low-level sewer begins in Putney and runs through Battersea, Vauxhall, and under the Old Kent Road and Bermondsey to Deptford.

At Deptford pumping station the sewage is lifted by 18.9 ft (5.76 m) to the next section of the sewer which then runs east under Greenwich and Woolwich. From Plumstead to Crossness Pumping Station, the covered sewer forms the southern boundary of Thamesmead and has been landscaped as an elevated footpath called the Ridgeway (similar to The Greenway built over the Northern Outfall Sewer).

== See also ==
- London sewer system
- Thames Tideway Tunnel
