= Ridgeway (London) =

Footpath in London, England

Coordinates: 51.496686°N 0.1079209°E

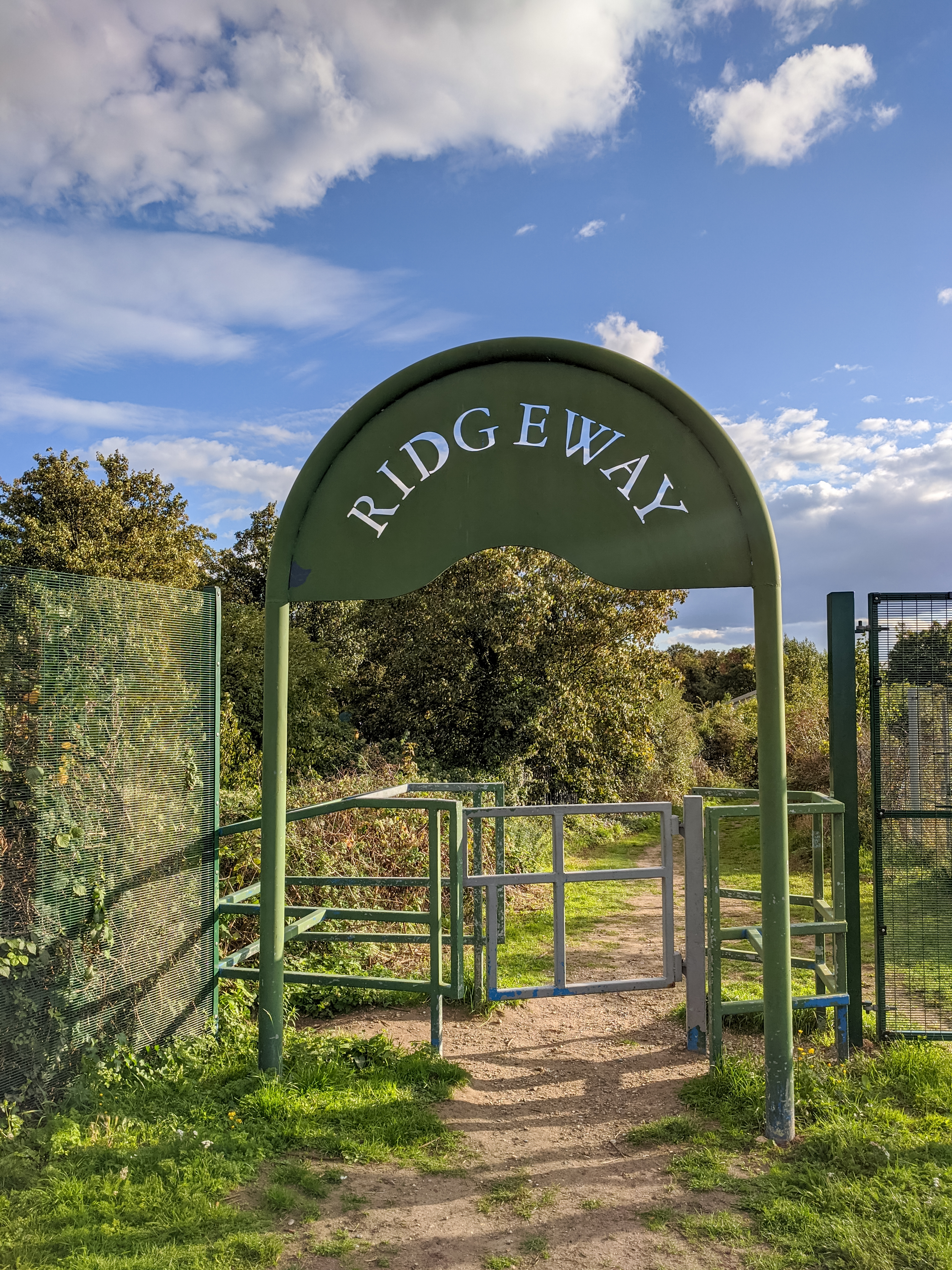
Sign marking the Ridgeway where it meets the Thames Path

The Ridgeway is a 3.5-mile (5.6 km) "cycling permitted pedestrian priority" footpath owned by Thames Water in southeast London. It runs between Plumstead and Crossness on an embankment that covers the Joseph Bazalgette Southern Outfall Sewer.

== Route ==
The Ridgeway runs ENE/WSW: the western two thirds between Plumstead railway station and The Link Thamesmead, home of the London College of Performing Arts, is in the Royal Borough of Greenwich.

The remainder of the Ridgeway towards the Thames Path and Crossness Pumping Station is in the London Borough of Bexley.

A similar path called the Greenway covers the Northern Outfall Sewer.

== History ==
The sewers were installed after an outbreak of cholera in 1853 and the "Great Stink" of 1858.

== Development ==
The pathway at the Greenwich end of the Ridgeway was refurbished in 2010 and the pathway at the Bexley end of the Ridgeway was refurbished in 2017.

The Ridgeway is incorporated in to the Thamesmead 5K and family 1 mile runs organised by the Thamesmead running club and Peabody Trust.

The Ridgeway and several surrounding areas have been recognised by the Mayor of London and the London boroughs as a site of importance for nature conservation (SINC) since 2016.

In 2018, the Plumstead entrance to the Ridgeway was refurbished, with public art work installed by local artist Sam Skinner and Ninth Seal. Further changes to the Plumstead entrance and surrounding public realm are planned in 2024 as a result of issues highlighted in the Plumstead Area Framework conducted by Greenwich council in 2016.

A petition was created by local users of the Ridgeway for litter bins to be installed along its length. The petition was rejected by Greenwich council in January 2018.

In 2018, the American artist Duke Riley installed a temporary art installations at the end of the Ridgeway, on land previously used as the driving range for the Thamesview Golf centre. The event organised as part of the London International Festival of Theatre (LIFT) 2018 was called 'Fly By Night' and featured 1,500 LED-lit, trained pigeons flying above the River Thames.

In 2023, the Ridgeway featured in the 'Thamesmead Light Festival: Light The Way' which incorporated a number of light sculptures on a walking trail between the Lakeside Arts Centre, Crossway Park and Sporting Club Thamesmead. That year, the Ridgeway was also included as one of the 22 sites selected by the Mayor of London for the second round of his Rewild London Fund. The funding aimed to create a 'Thamesmead Pollinator Corridor' and was led by the North West Kent Countryside Partnership in collaboration with the BumbleBee Conservation Trust, Bow Arts, University of East London and the Ridgeway Users community group. Subsequently, the rare brown-banded carder bee has been recorded on sites that had been planted as part of the pollinator corridor project. As part of the Thamesmead Pollinator Corridor project, the artist, Ellen Strachan was commissioned to create two interpretation boards on the Ridgeway. These boards were unveiled by the Mayor of Bexley on 8 April 2024.

In 2023, the Belgium artist and film-maker, Elise Guillaume held a 'Listening to the Bees' workshop on the Ridgeway organised as part of the Three Rivers Bexley Alliance with the BumbleBee Conservation Trust and the Ridgeway Users community group.

In 2025, Gallery No. 32 held a winter sculpture park at the end of the Ridgeway, on the former Thamesview golf centre.

Between 2024 - 2029 the Ridgeway Biodiversity Project will be undertaken. It is funded through a biodiversity offsetting agreement between Thames Water, the landowner and Cory Riverside Energy. It will involve 'removing denser areas of scrub and non-native species, while restoring and extending the areas of more open habitats such as grassland, wildflowers and bare ground' and will take place in two phases over five years.

At the western end of the Ridgeway, the housing association Peabody Trust in association with Berkeley Group built 1,964 homes adjacent to Plumstead bus garage. As part of the planning process for this development, extensive archaeological excavations were carried out along Pettman Crescent adjacent to the Plumstead end of the Ridgeway. Improvements to existing public spaces around the development included improvements to pathways that pass the Ridgeway and the creation of the 'ColourWay' by the artist Adam Nathaniel Furman, Adams & Sutherland Architects, Many Hands Murals and Make:Good design studios in 2026.

There is a Facebook group, Instagram page, and Twitter page for Ridgeway Users.

== Future proposals ==
There is an option to extend the Royal Arsenal Narrow Gauge (RANG) steam railway from Crossness car park to Plumstead railway station via the Ridgeway.

Proposals have been put forward by the Pharaoh Project to create a 'biodome' within the underpass at Pettman Crescent adjacent to the Plumstead entrance of the Ridgeway.

Planning applications have been submitted for the construction of film studios opposite the entrance to the Ridgeway and Kellner Road, and within the disused Plumstead power station on White Hart Road to the South of the Ridgeway.

Devon and Cornwall Railways Limited have had plans approved to reinstate the Plumstead Goods Yard next to the Ridgeway as a fully active freight site to receive aggregate and other rail imported material to serve London.

Peabody Trust have been working to open up access to the Ridgeway from the Thames Path and have partnered with Sustrans to work on proposals to develop a route from Southmere Lake via the Ridgeway through the former Thamesview Golf Centre to the River Thames.

Greenwich Council have put forward plans to construct a new traveller site on a triangular area of land off Church Manorway near Sewell Road next to the Ridgeway.

=== TfL rail proposals ===
In a presentation by TfL to the Greenwich Council, they proposed an extension of the Gospel Oak to Barking London Overground train service from the new Barking Riverside station to Thamesmead Central and via Plumstead to Woolwich Arsenal that would take a route along the eastern section of the Ridgeway or Belvedere station using the eastern section of the Ridgeway. However, other Overground and DLR options would not be using the Ridgeway.

== Media ==
The Ridgeway was the subject of a radio show on Resonance FM in 2011. It also features in an app produced by London Borough of Bexley to promote heritage walking trails. To celebrate the launch of the Elizabeth line on 24 May 2022, the YouTuber Runderground Matt featured the Ridgeway in his run across the core section of the line from Abbey Wood to Paddington. The YouTube channel called 'Cripple Cruise' has featured the Ridgeway in several of their POV style videos taken from the perspective of a mobility scooter user. The Ridgeway is featured in the book, Everything from the Egg, by the British artist Stephen Turner and published by The Artist Agency in 2023. The book describes the journey of his art installation, the Exbury Egg, including its residency at the Lakeside Centre in Thamesmead in 2019, next to the Ridgeway.

== Gallery ==
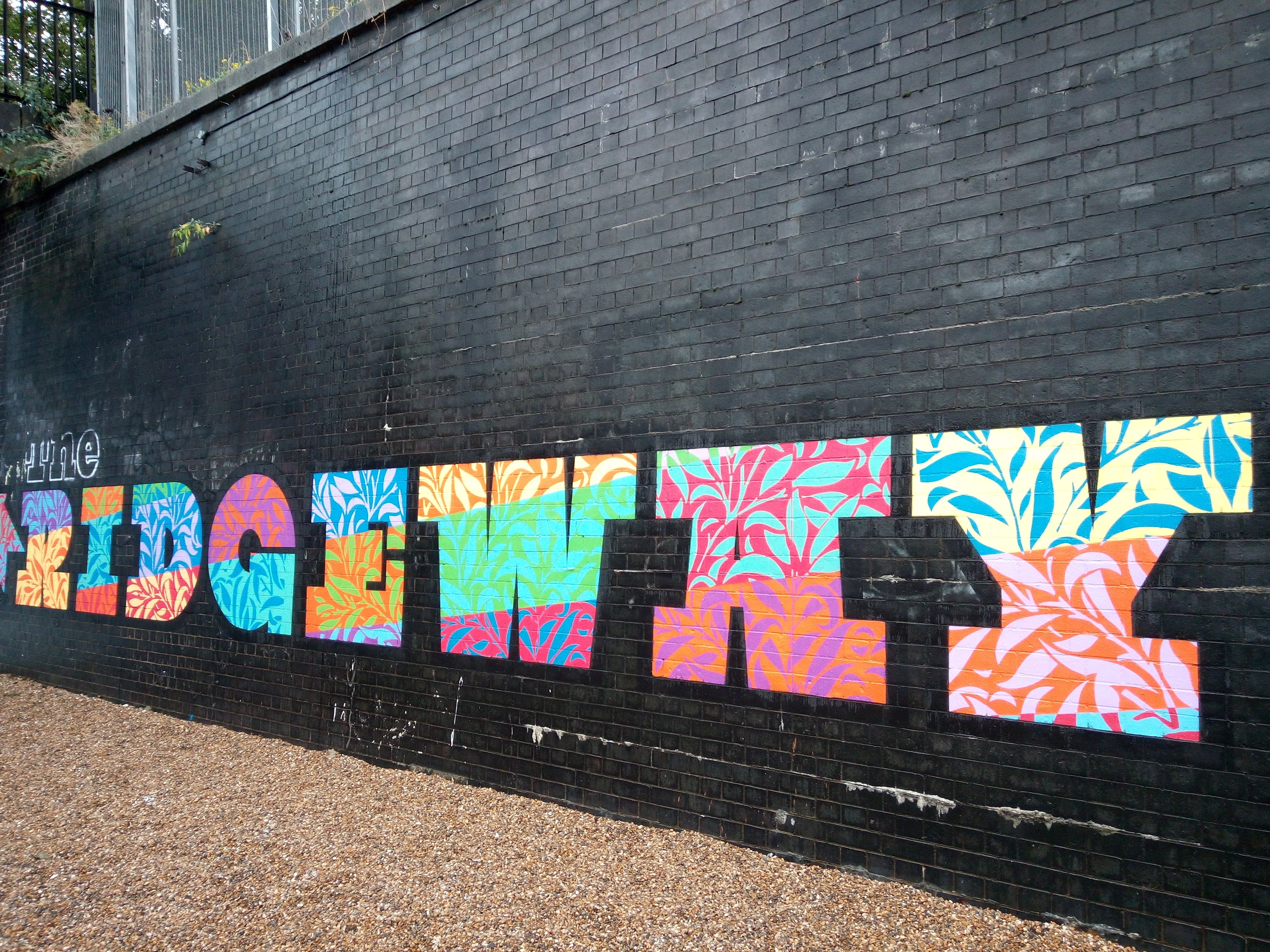
Sign outside Ridgeway Plumstead lower entrance

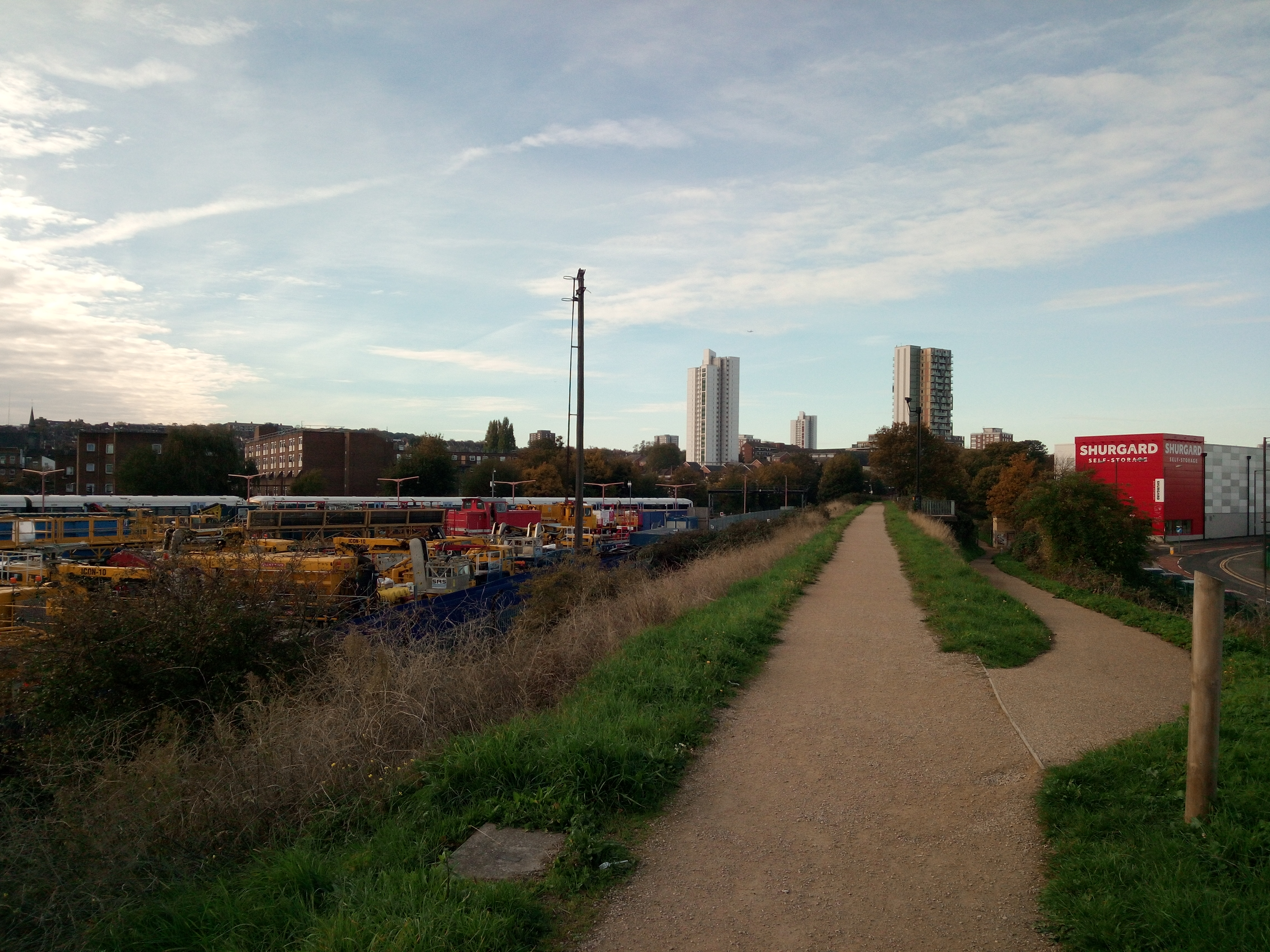
Ridgeway upper level looking towards Plumstead and Nathan Road exit. Close to the site of the Manor Ground arena

Ridgeway entrance on the Thames Path

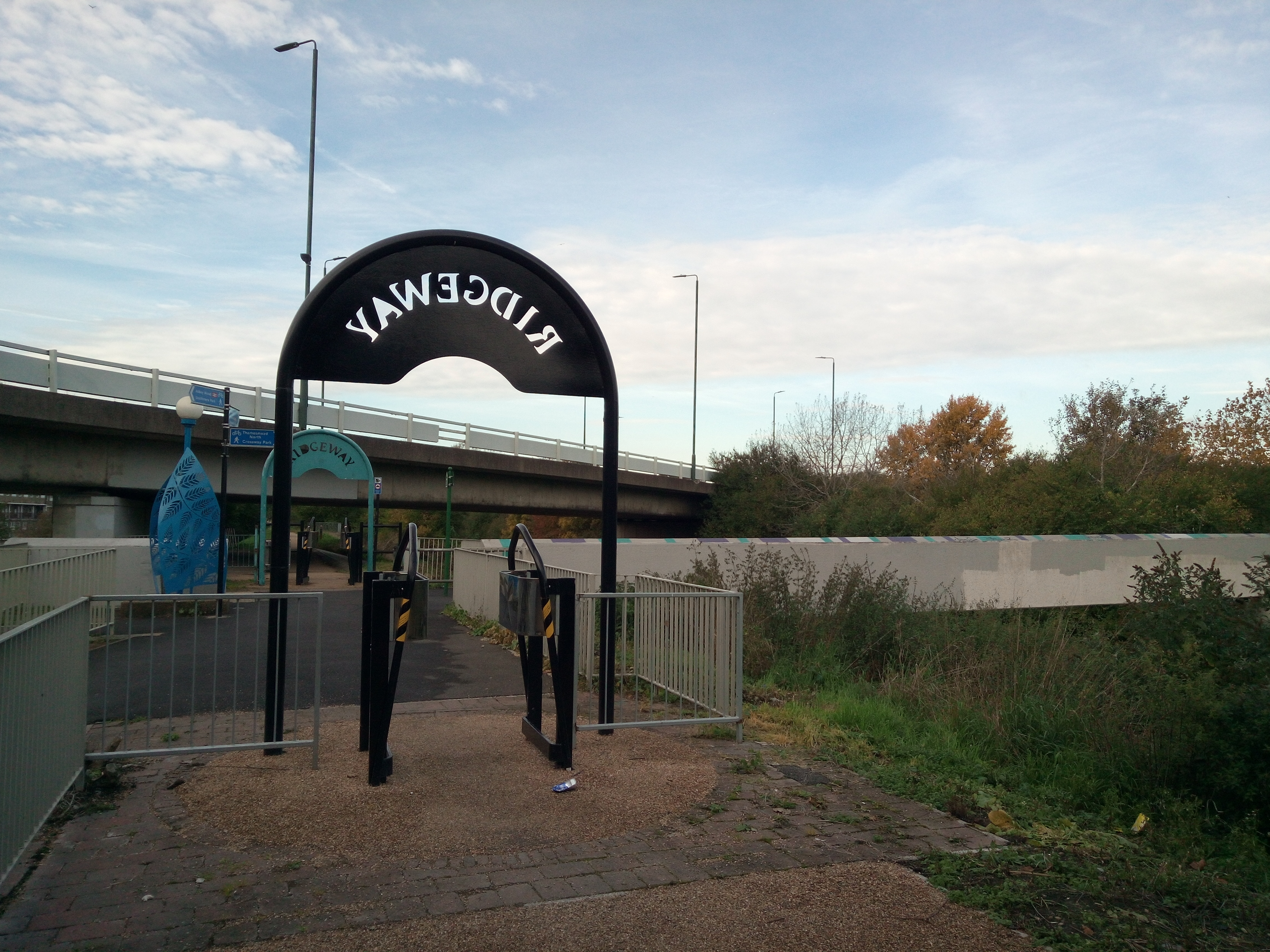
Example of arch signs along the route

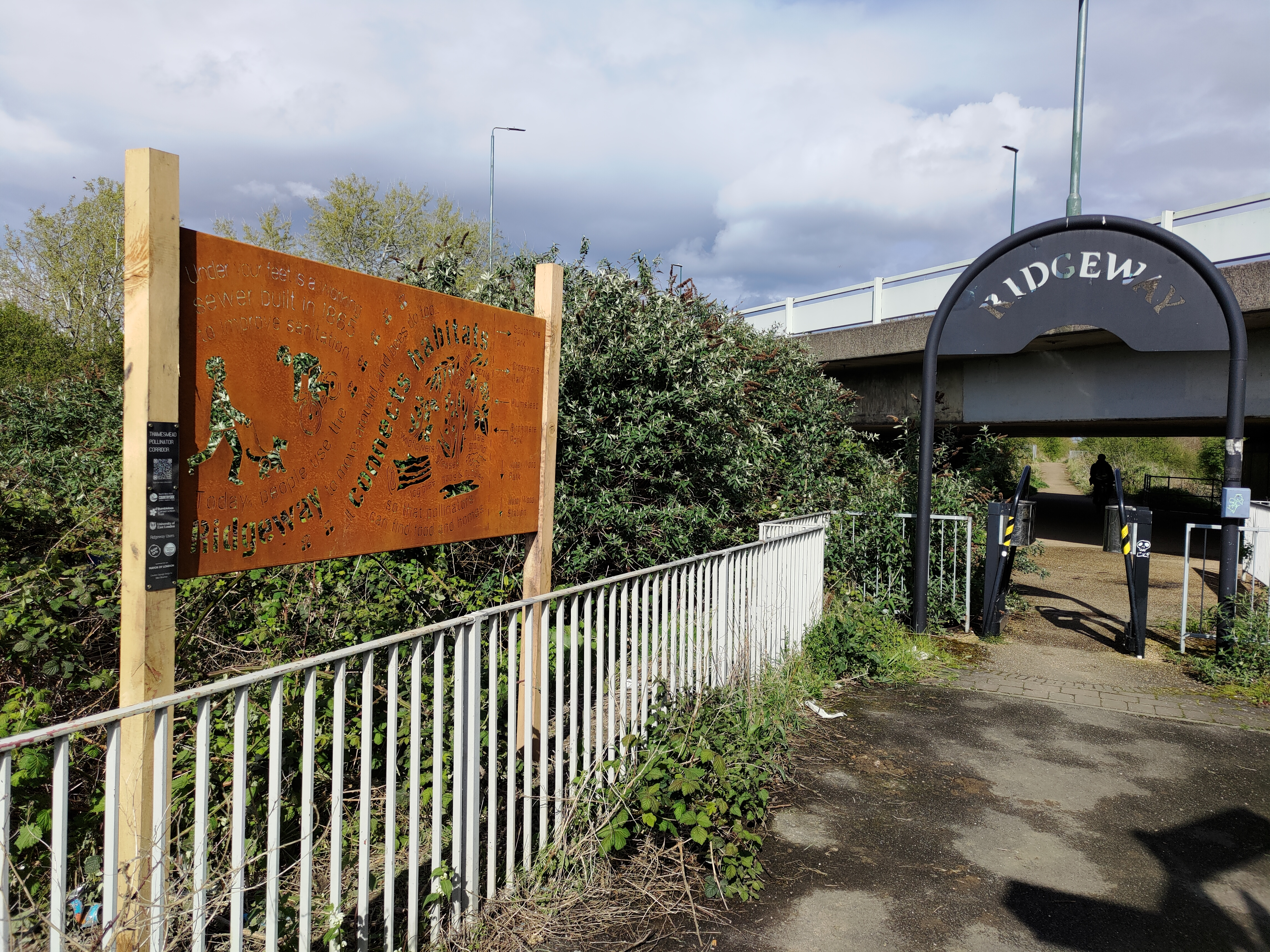
Ridgeway interpretation board (on the left) at Cory Bridge by Abbey Wood based artist, Ellen Strachan
