= Church Manor Way Halt railway station =

Former railway station in England

Church Manor Way Halt
- Interactive map of Church Manor Way Halt

General information
- Location: Abbey Wood
- Local authority: Greenwich
- Number of platforms: 2

Railway companies
- Original company: South Eastern Railway

Key dates
- 1 January 1917: Opened
- 1 January 1920: Closed

Other information
- Coordinates: 51.4905°N 0.1027°E

Church Manor Way Halt was a halt station in south-east London, between Plumstead and Abbey Wood on the North Kent Line of the South Eastern and Chatham Railway.

It was built to serve munitions workers at Woolwich Arsenal during the First World War. It was opened in 1917 and closed in 1920. The halt was named Church Manor Way after the road in which it was situated.

Preceding station	Historical railways	Following station
Plumstead	South Eastern and Chatham Railway North Kent Line	Abbey Wood
