= Erith Marshes =

Marsh in Bexley, England

Coordinates: 51.499°N 0.138°E

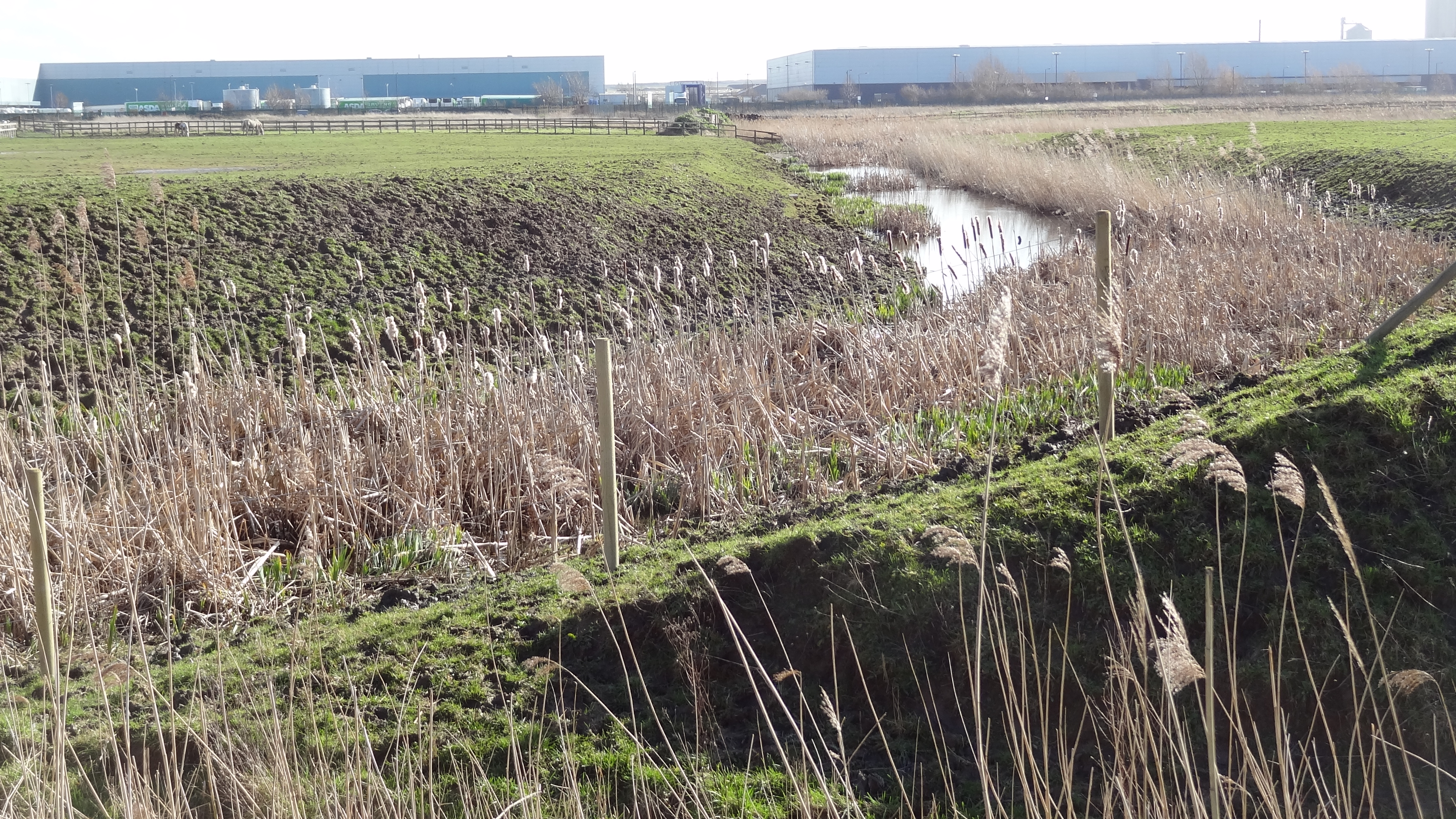
A view of Crossness Nature Reserve one of the fragments of the marshes that has remained undeveloped

Erith Marshes is an area of grazing marsh beside the south bank of River Thames in London, England. It is located next to the Crossness Sewage Treatment Works and is owned by Thames Water. It is a Site of Metropolitan Importance for Nature Conservation in the London Borough of Bexley. It can be accessed by London Buses routes 177, 180, 229, 401 and 472.

The bulk of the marshes which once existed from Woolwich to Erith have now been built upon. The small part that remains is owned by Thames Water, who manage a wildlife area.

Between 2007 and 2010 two construction projects built over more than half of the marsh that remained. Tilfen Land built a new industrial/commercial complex, and London's incinerator expanded.
