= Greenway footpath, London =

Shared pedestrian and bicycle path in London

Coordinates: 51°31′19″N 0°02′58″E

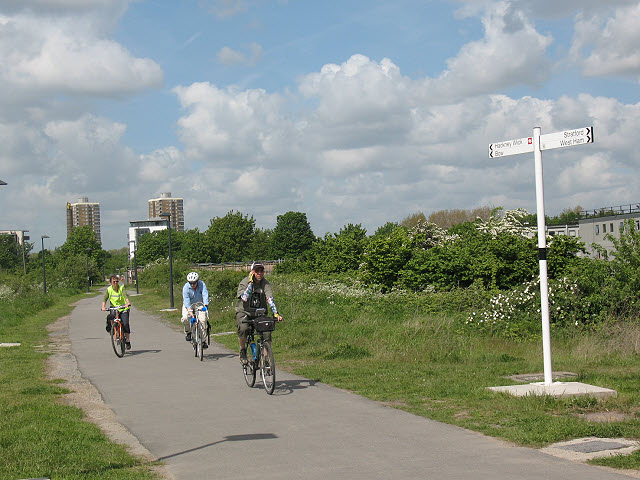
The Greenway at Stratford Marsh

The Greenway is a 7-kilometre (4.3 mi) long footpath and cycleway in London, mostly in the London Borough of Newham, on the embankment containing the Northern Outfall Sewer designed by Joseph Bazalgette.

== Route ==
The western end of the Greenway is Victoria Park, London (London Borough of Tower Hamlets). The route runs alongside Wick Lane, under the East Cross Route to Fish Island. It then crosses the River Lea into Newham, continuing to Stratford and West Ham. The eastern end is at Royal Docks Road in Beckton.

The Capital Ring walking route (section 14) follows the Greenway for most of its distance, which also forms part 4 of the 2012 Jubilee Greenway

The western half of the Greenway embankment is roughly at house eaves height giving a view over the surrounding area. Between Stratford High Street and Beckton the route is flat. There is a renewed tarmac surface along its full length, with grass kept short on either side and bushes/trees on the embankment sides. The tarmac area is the width of a narrow two way road allowing easy passing of pedestrians and cyclists, with approx the same width of grass on either side.

The Greenway and several surrounding areas have been recognised by the Mayor of London and the London boroughs as a Site of Importance for Nature Conservation (SINC) since 2016.

In mid-2018, Transport for London designated the section of the Greenway between the A13 and A118 as Quietway 22.

A similar path called the Ridgeway covers the Southern Outfall Sewer.

== Renovation ==
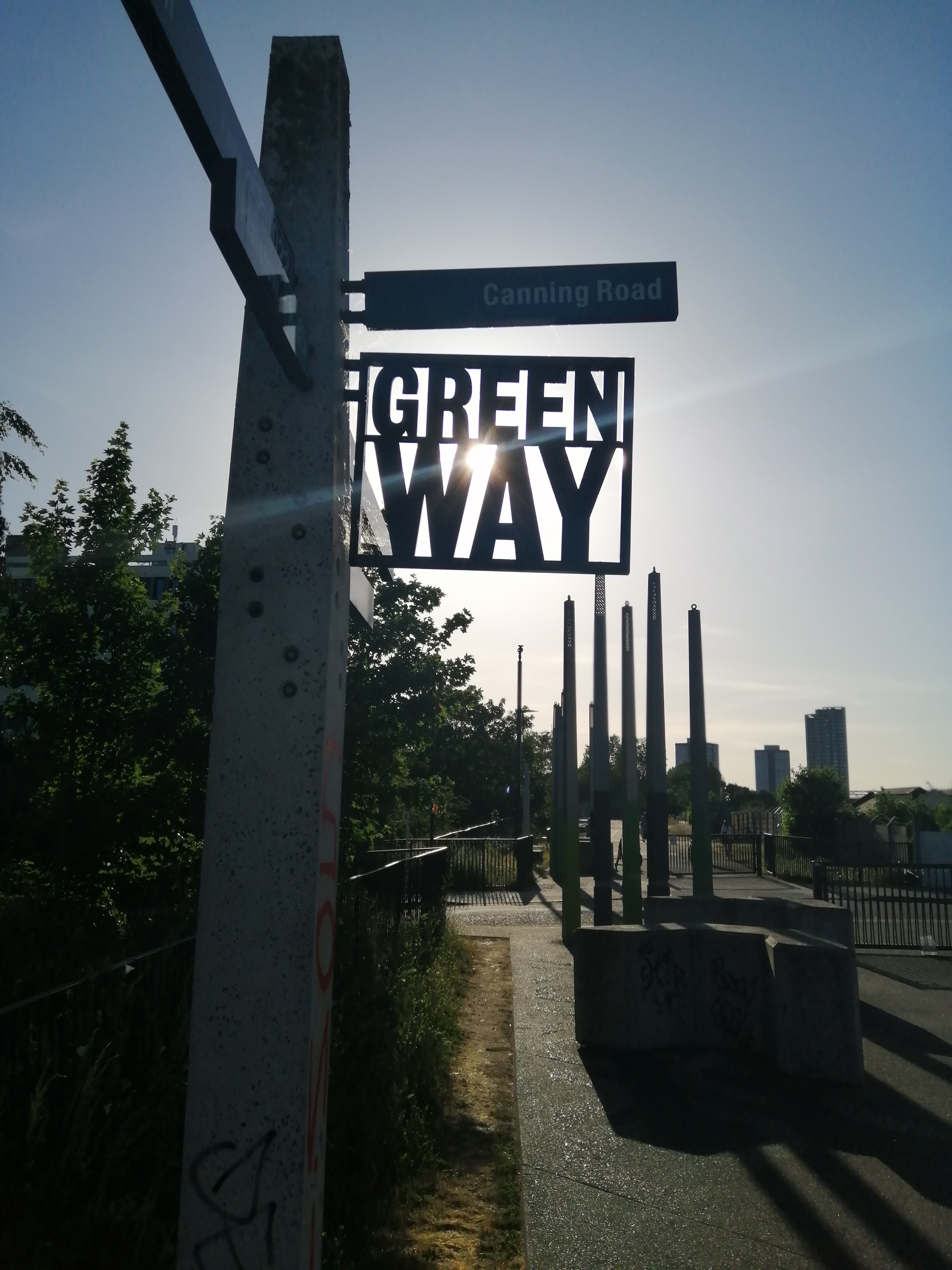
London Greenway Sign with logo

Work has taken place to resurface and renovate the route—especially around the Olympic Park.

A community group was set up in 2016 for Greenway users, and Newham Council began piloting better lighting, with a view to opening the Greenway 24 hours a day. Greenway Users have subsequently set up a Greenway Action Group to improve the recording of incidents by logging crimes on the pathway.

The renovation of the Greenway was finished in July 2019, after the completion of major water supply works by Thames Water along the western half and the opening of the bridges over the Waterworks River and the City Mill River.

In 2022, the Greenway was the site of one of 19 projects selected by the Mayor of London's Rewild London Fund to help 'rewild the city and recover nature'.

The View Tube, made from recycled shipping containers, is a viewing platform on the Greenway incorporating the Container Café.

Bow Goods yard, a large plot of land situated between the Greenway and the railway tracks between Stratford and central London is set to become a rail freight campus and last-mile logistics hub.

== History ==
The older alternative name for the route is Sewerbank, with the name Greenway introduced after a renovation in the mid-1990s.

In 1931 Mahatma Gandhi visited London for a period of three months for talks on the future of India, he based himself at Kingsley Hall in Bromley-by-Bow. His host there, the Christian Socialist Muriel Lester described his long early morning walks, beginning before sunrise, and which often took in the Sewerbank through Stratford to Plaistow. Gandhi enjoyed the elevated view the bank offered, and on these walks he would always gather a collection of well-wishers eager to speak to him. Gandhi loved these everyday interactions with ordinary workmen, housewives and children, telling the News Chronicle: "I love the East End, especially the little urchins in the streets. They give me such friendly greetings".

== Gallery ==
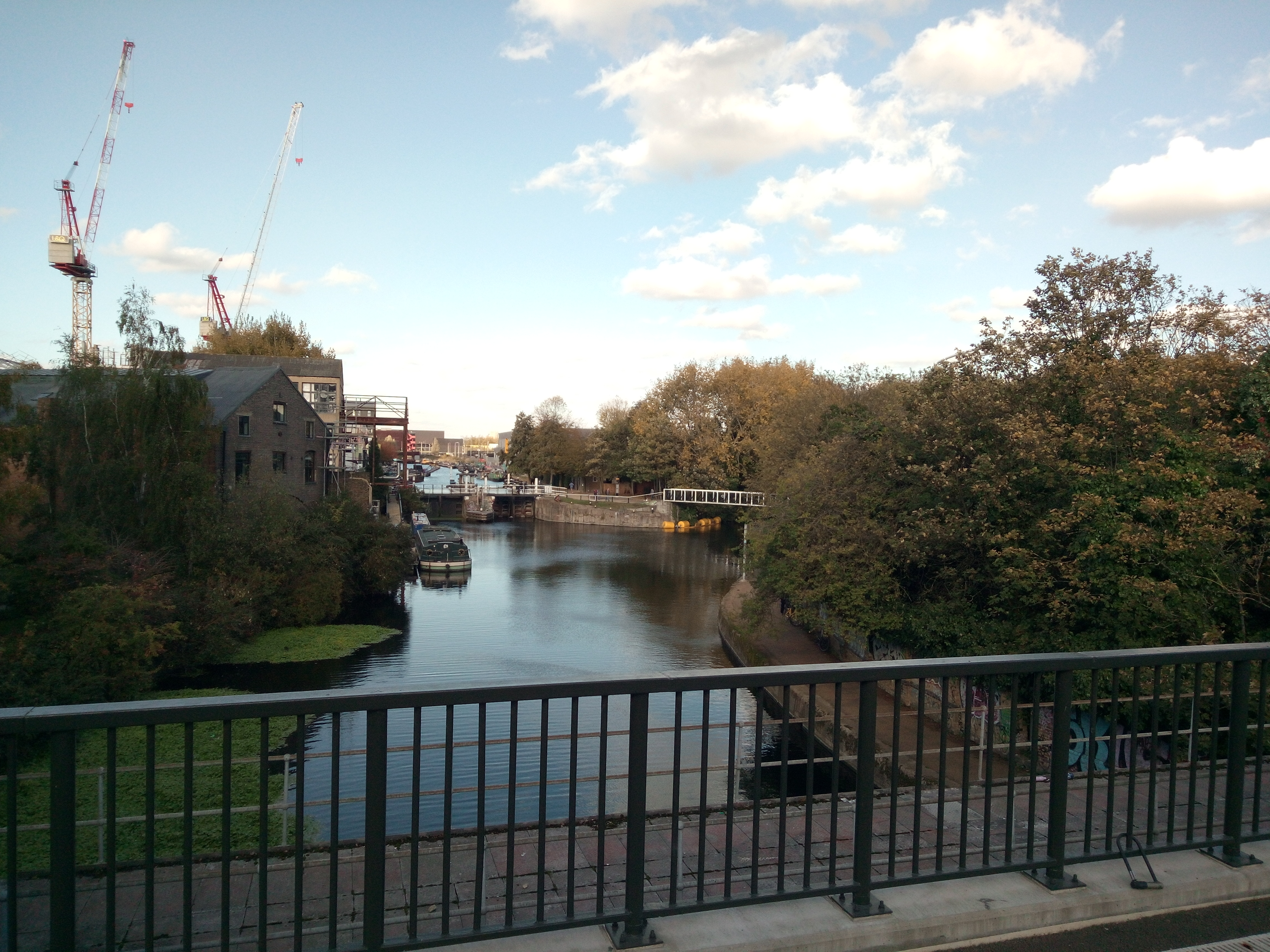
Greenway bridge over the River Lea looking north

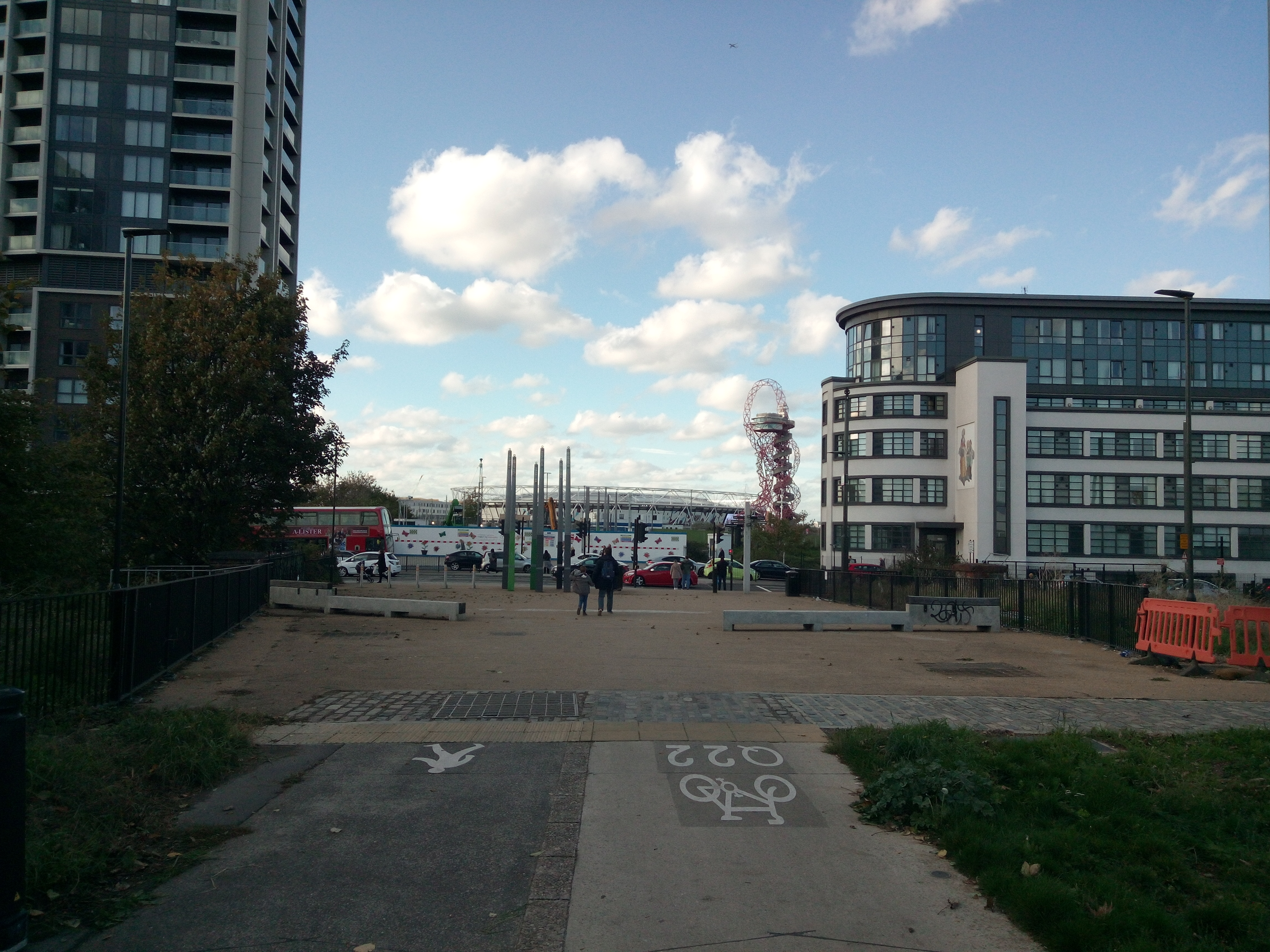
Greenway junction with Stratford High Street (A118) looking west

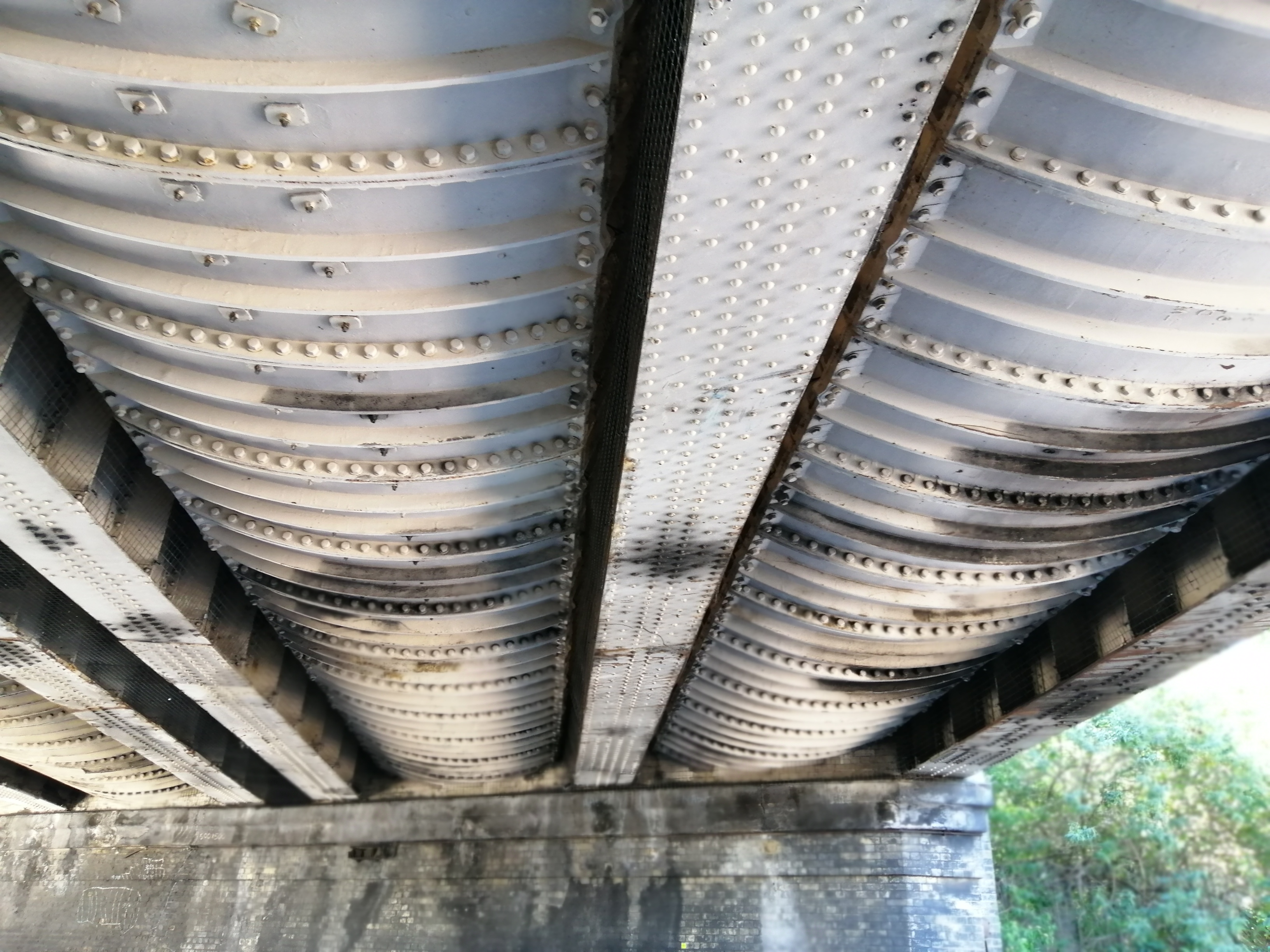
Northern Outfall Sewer (Greenway) over Manor Road A1011

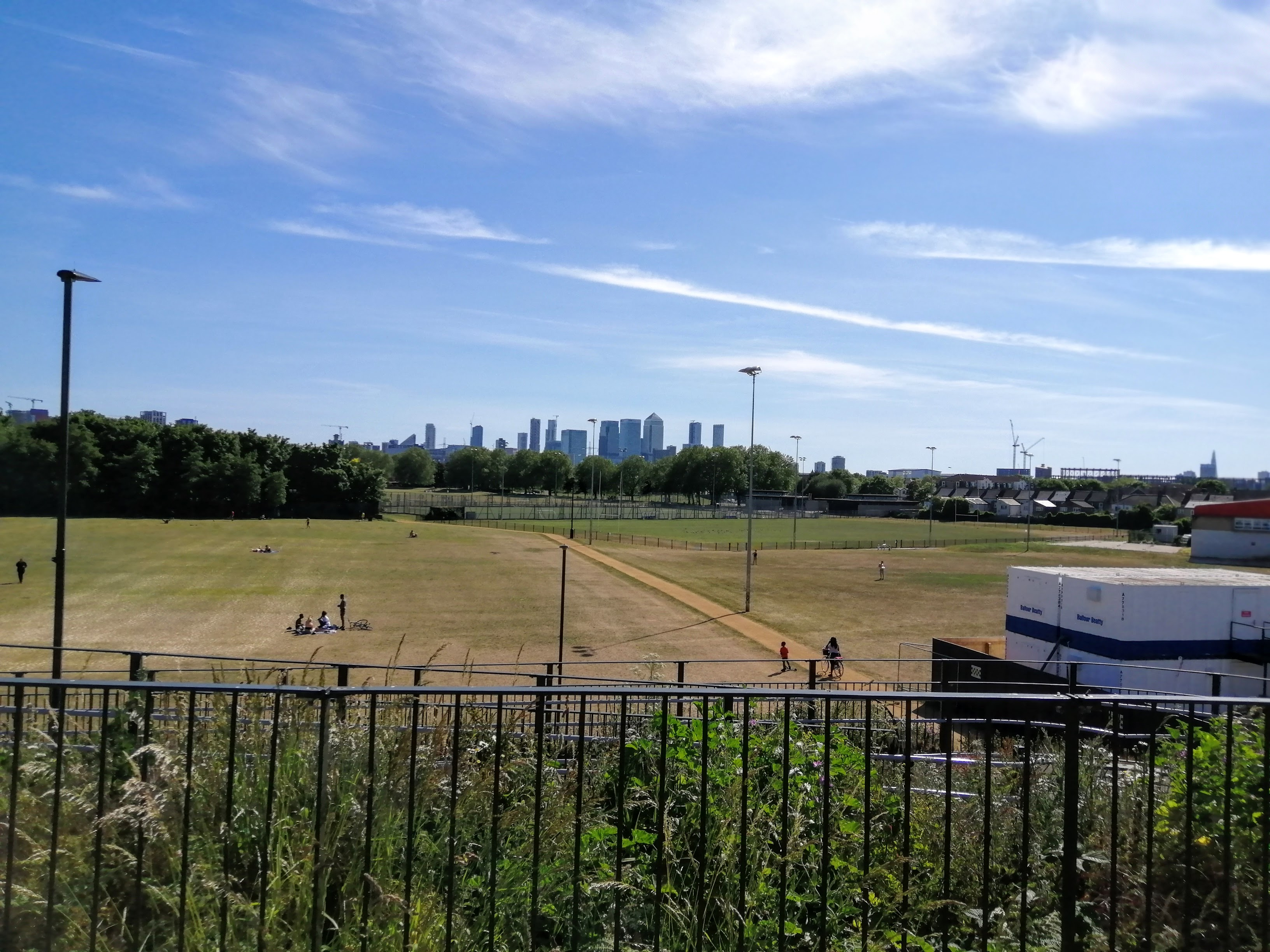
London Greenway footpath looking towards Canary Wharf

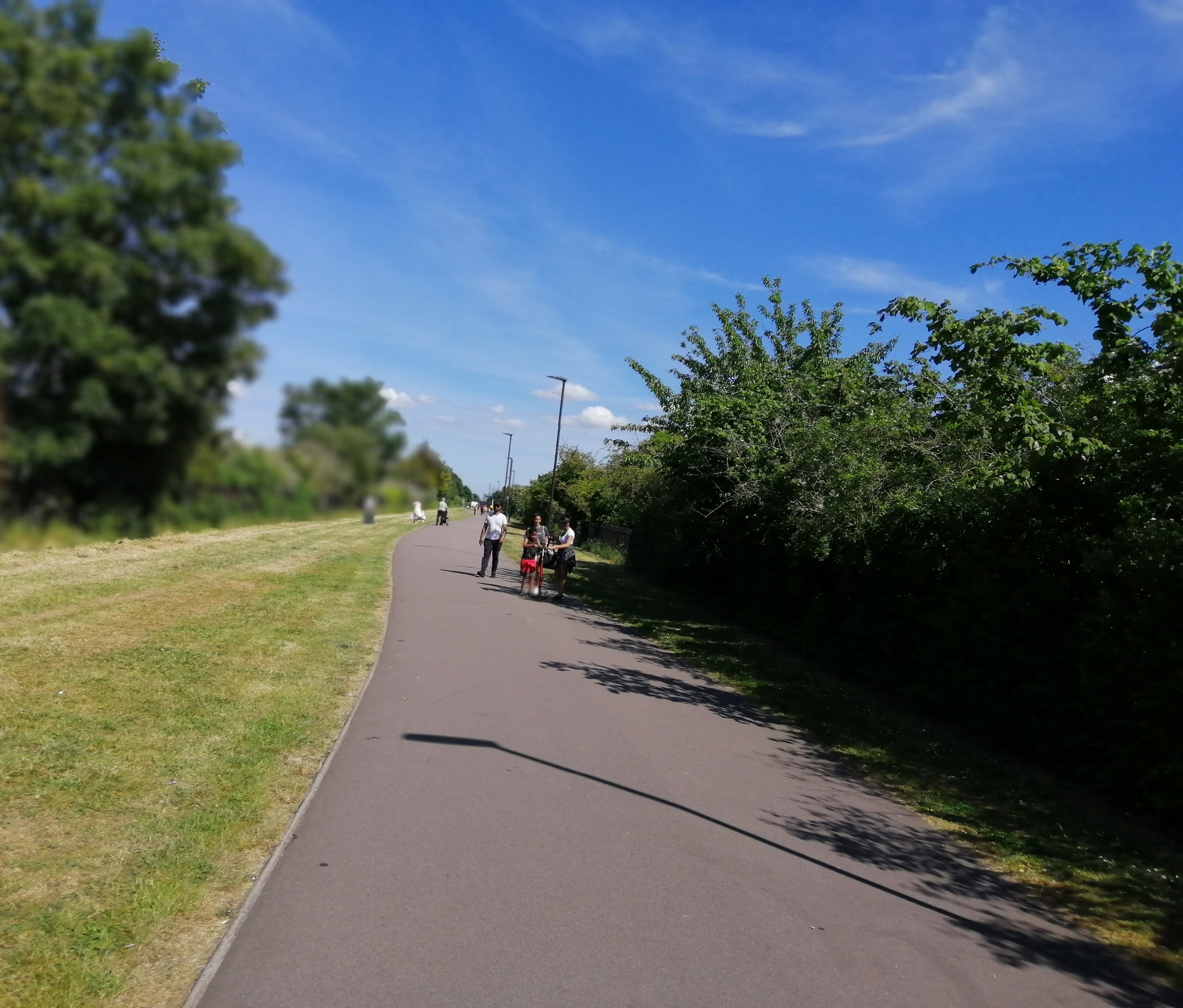
Greenway footpath, London looking south east

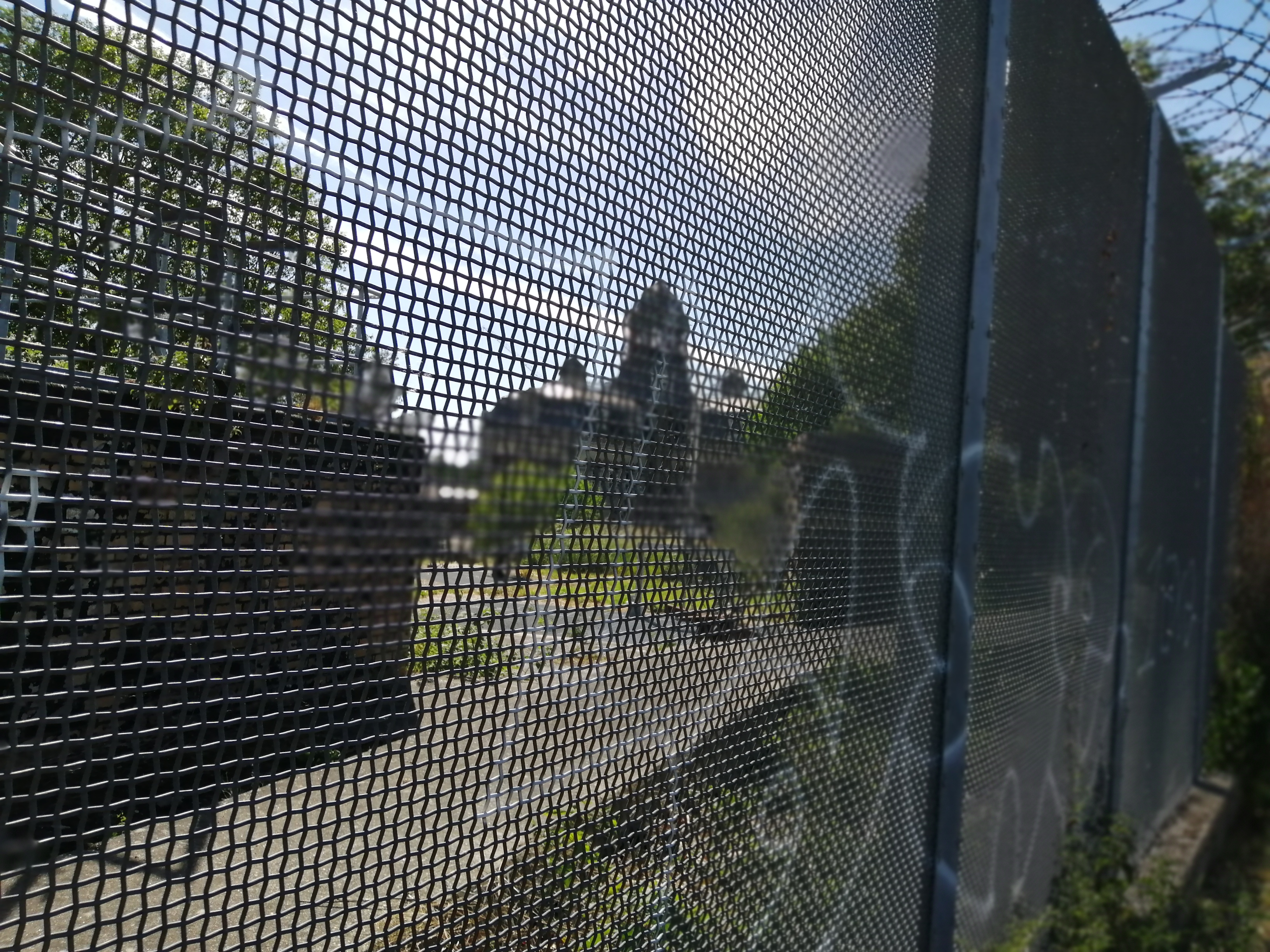
Greenway footpath, London looking at Abbey Mills pumping station

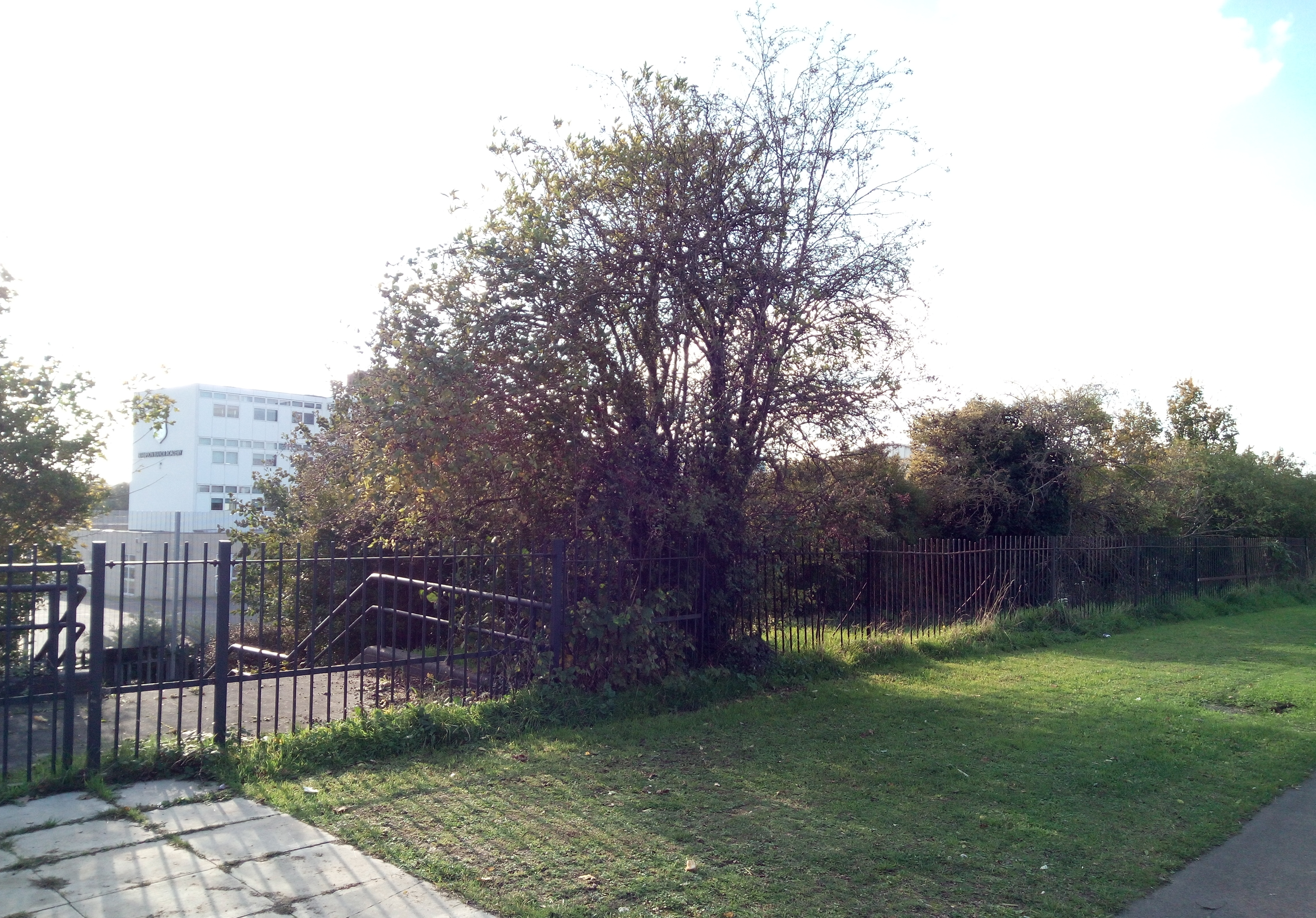
Greenway overlooking Brampton Manor Academy

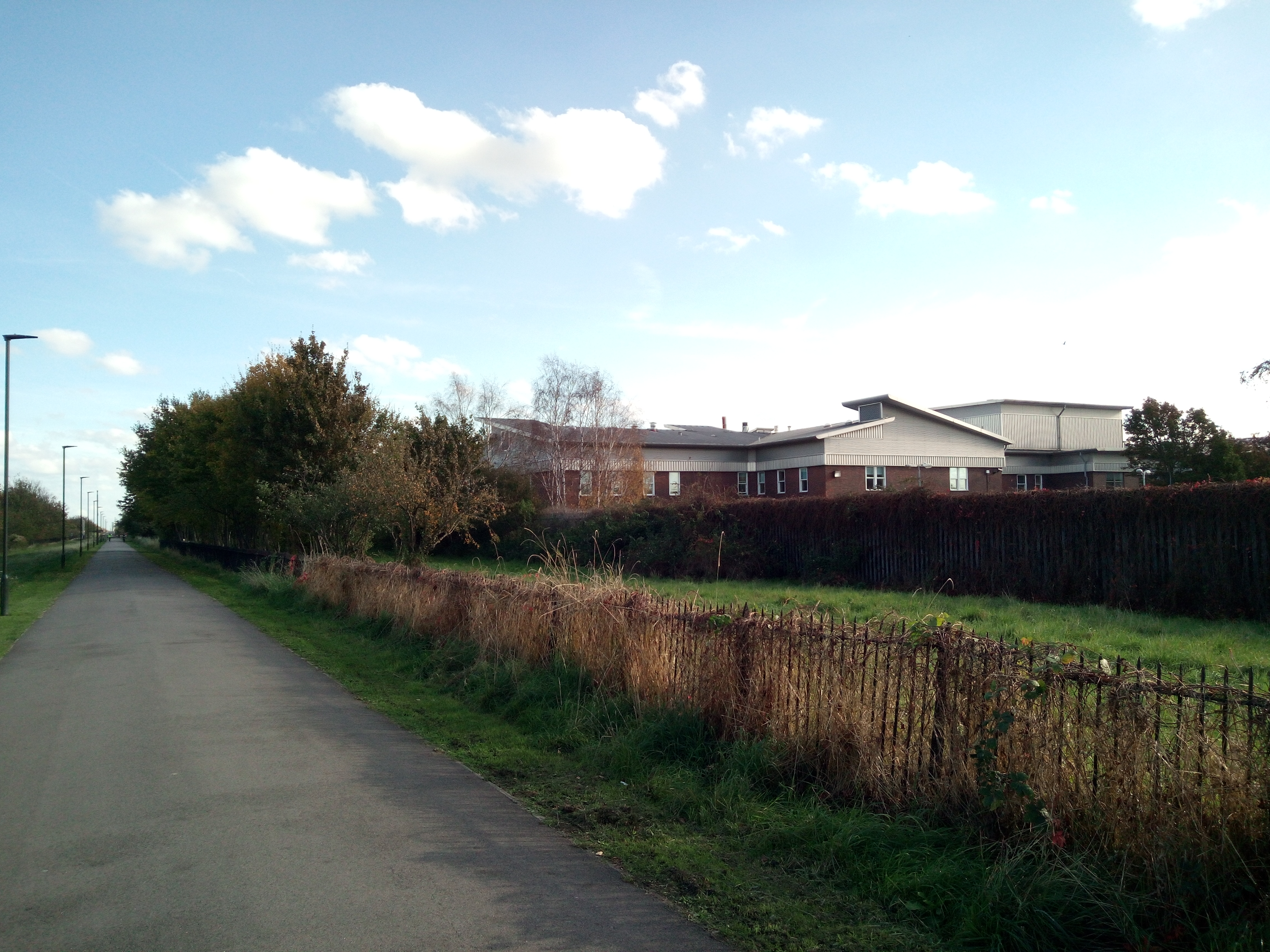
Greenway overlooking Newham University Hospital

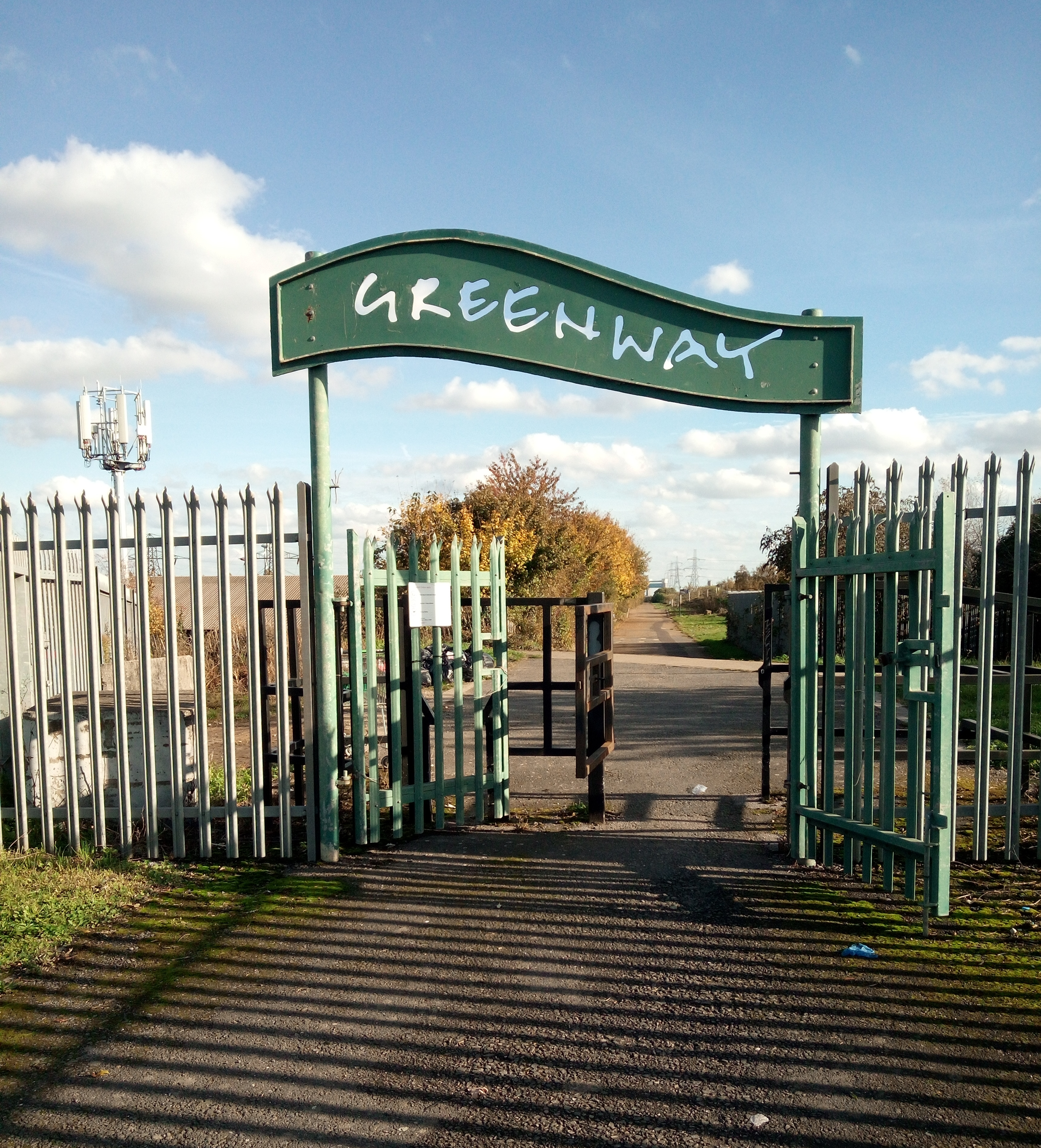
Greenway entrance at Newham Way (A13) looking east
