= Jubilee Greenway =

Walking and cycling route in London, England

Coordinates: 51.5005°N 0.0651°W

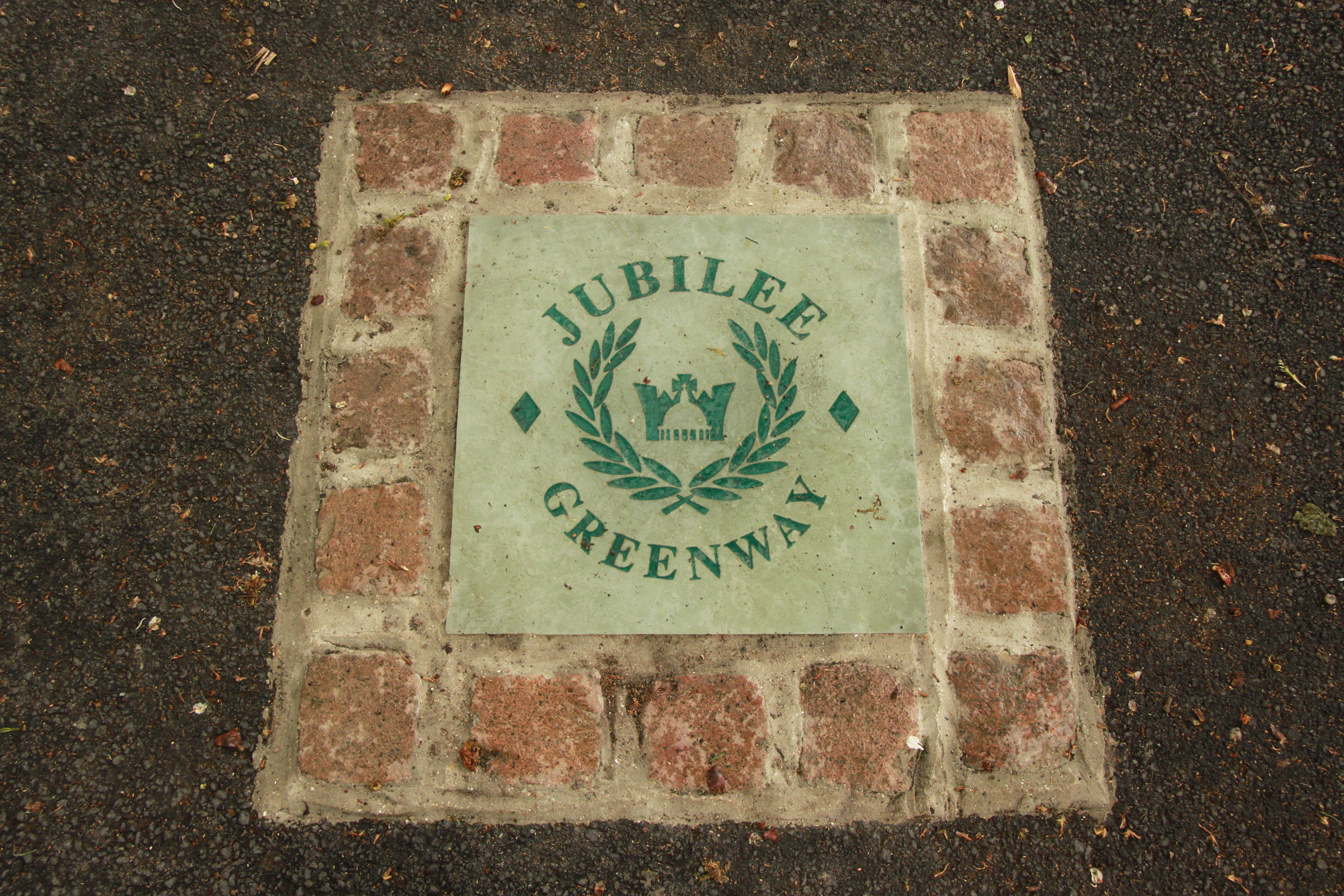
- Sign marking the route in Victoria Park.
- Length: 60 km (37 mi)
- Location: London, England
- Established: 2012
- Trailheads: Circular
- Use: Walking, Cycling
- Difficulty: Easy
- Season: All year
- Sights: Kensington Palace, Little Venice, Chapel Market, Victoria Park, Queen Elizabeth Olympic Park, The O2 Arena, Greenwich Park, HMS Belfast, Shakespeare's Globe, Buckingham Palace, Regent's Park, Camden Market, Beckton District Park North, Woolwich foot tunnel, Thames Barrier

The Jubilee Greenway is a walking and cycling route in London, England. It was completed in 2012 to mark the Diamond Jubilee of Elizabeth II. The 60 kilometres (37 mi) route of continuous paths links 2012 Olympic and Paralympic venues with parks, waterways and other attractions.

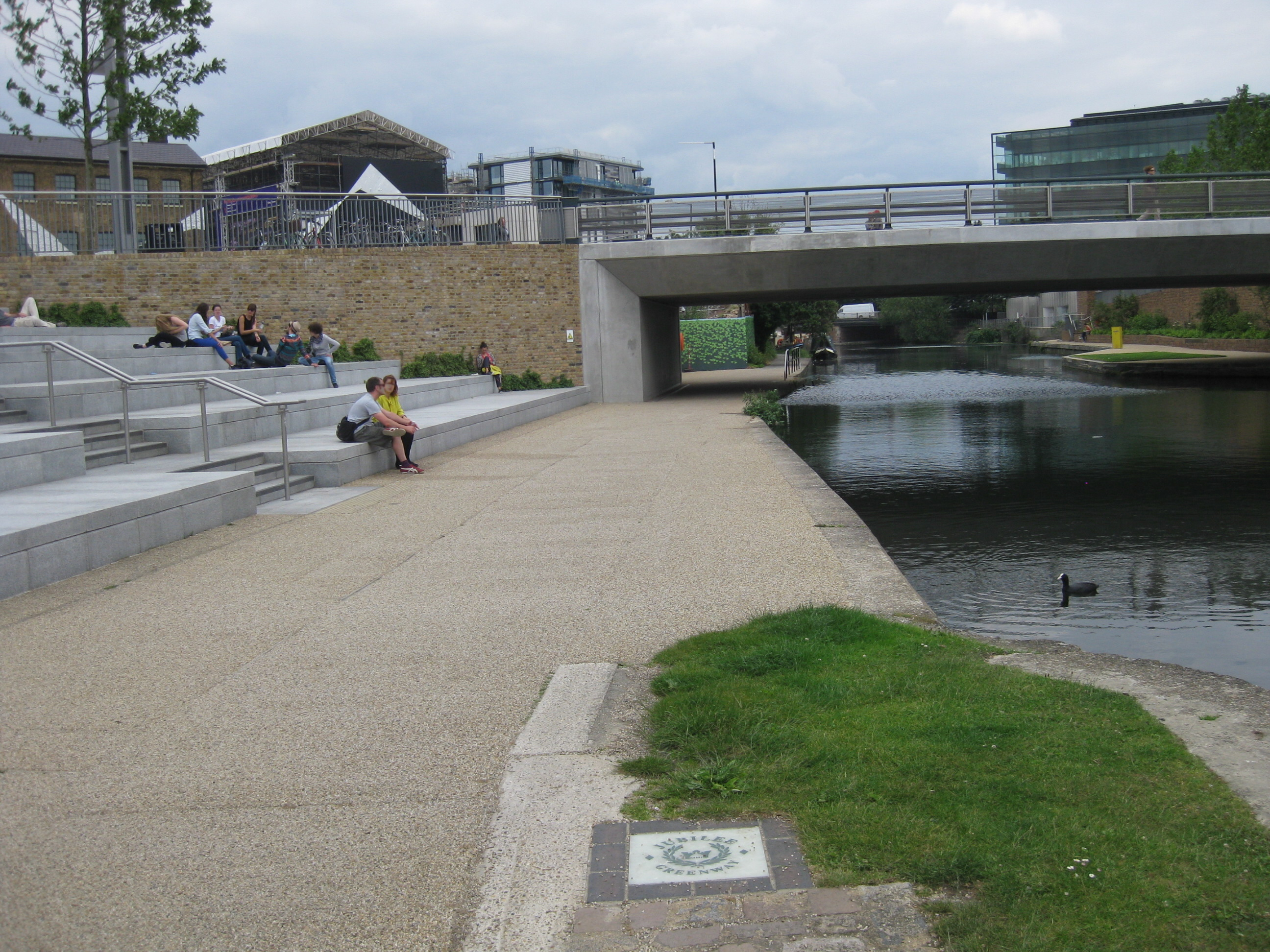
Jubilee Greenway near St Pancras Lock on the Regent's Canal, Camden

== Background ==
The Jubilee Greenway is part of the Inspire programme, run by the London Organising Committee of the 2012 Summer Olympics and 2012 Summer Paralympics.

== Route ==
The Jubilee Greenway makes use of existing walking and cycling routes wherever possible beginning at Buckingham Palace and joining Green Park, Hyde Park and Kensington Gardens with Paddington Station and the Grand Union Canal at Little Venice. Following the Regent's Canal through Camden Town, The Greenway then connects to East London through Victoria Park to the River Thames where the Woolwich foot tunnel ties Greenwich and the South Bank to the Jubilee Walkway at Tower Bridge and back to St James's via Westminster.
