= Crossness Nature Reserve =

Nature reserve in Crossness, London, England

Coordinates: 51.501°N 0.148°E

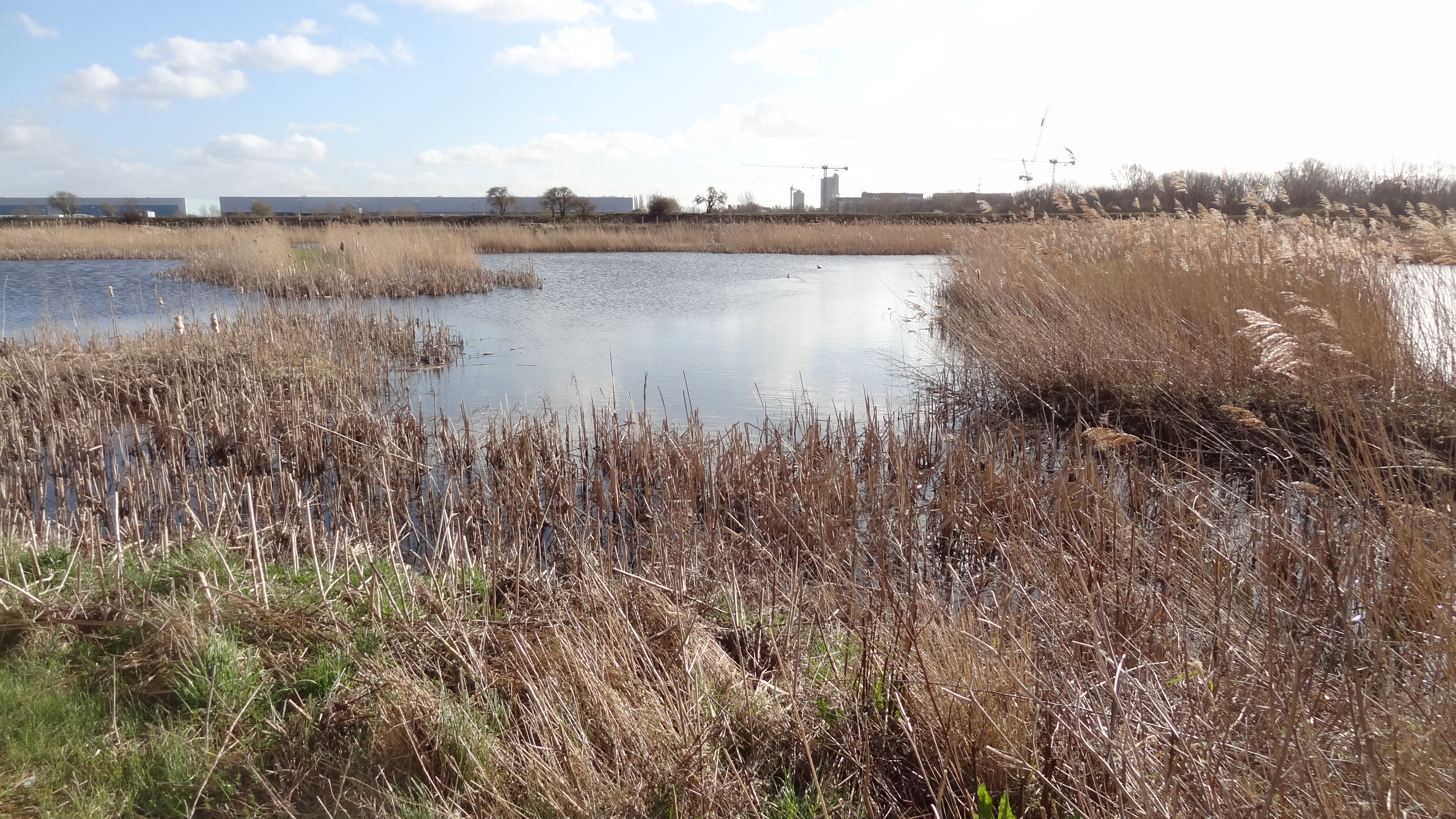
One of the many ponds in Crossness Nature Reserve

Crossness Nature Reserve is a 25.5 hectare local nature reserve in Crossness in the London Borough of Bexley. It is part of the Erith Marshes Site of Metropolitan Importance for Nature Conservation. The site is adjacent to Crossness Sewage Treatment Works; the works form the reserve's western boundary. It was created under a planning condition (Section 106 agreement) in 1994 and is owned and managed by Thames Water. At the northern edge of the reserve is a waste management facility owned and operated by Cory.

Crossness is part of the original Thames floodplain called Erith Marshes. It is one of the few remaining areas of grazing marsh in London, and it has the largest reedbeds in Bexley. It also has ponds and ditches, and areas of scrub and rough grassland. It is a major site for water voles, and 130 species of birds have been recorded, together with some rare invertebrates, including five species of water beetles and one of the UK's rarest wild bumblebee species, the Shrill Carder bee. Scarce plants include Borrer's saltmarsh grass and frog rush, a species that was previously thought to be extinct in Kent.

Thames Water created a Friends of Crossness Nature Reserve (FoCNR) group which helps to manage protected areas of the nature reserve not open to the public.

== Developments ==
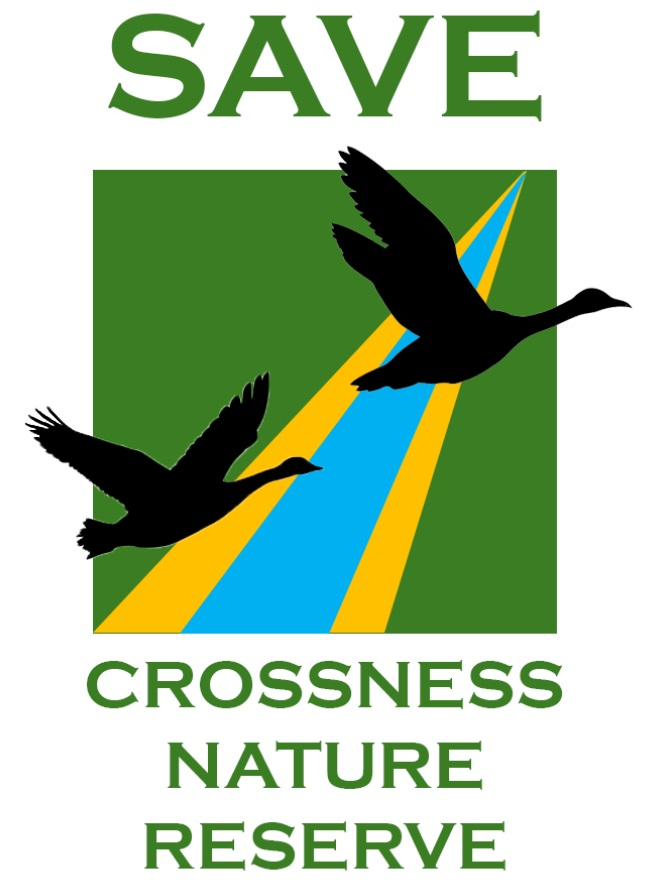
Save Crossness Nature Reserve Campaign logo

Between 2005 and 2011 the Belvedere Green Links project saw £1,000,000 spent on restoring Erith southern marsh and Crossness Nature Reserve, including the stable block. This was funded by the Homes & Communities Agency (HCA), the European Regional Development Fund (ERDF) and the Greater London Authority (GLA). Bexley Borough Council were key stakeholders.

In the early 2020s, Cory announced plans to create one of Europe's largest Carbon Capture and Storage (CCS) facilities in Belvedere, on a site including 11.7% of the 25.5 hectares of land at Crossness Nature Reserve. In December 2023, a campaign group (Save Crossness Nature Reserve) and petition was established to oppose the development. The petition generated 2,790 signatures. In June 2024, the campaign group sought to raise funds to fight the plans.

Despite the opposition to the development of the CCS, the Parliamentary Under Secretary of State, Martin McCluskey MP made the decision to approve the development, on behalf of the Secretary of State for Energy Security and Net Zero, Ed Miliband MP on 5th November 2025.
