= Crossness Pumping Station =

Sewage pumping station in London

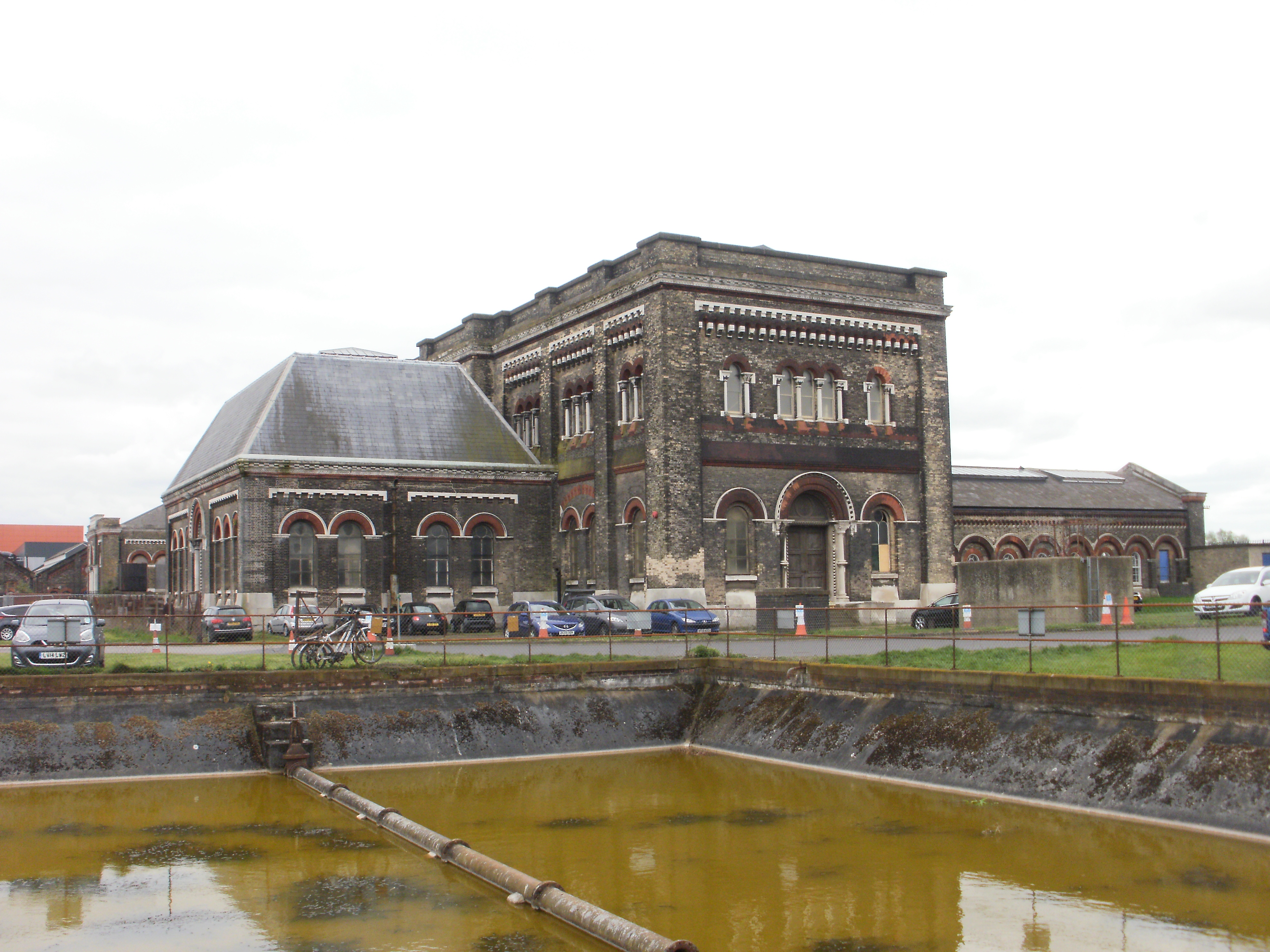
- Western exterior of the Crossness Pumping Station

- Location within London Borough of Bexley
- 51°30′33″N 0°08′18″E
- Location: Crossness Sewage Treatment Works; London, SE2; United Kingdom
- OS grid reference: TQ4849781080

History
- Built: 1859–1865

Site notes
- Architect: Charles Henry Driver
- Architectural style: Romanesque
- Owner: Thames Water

Listed Building – Grade I
- Designated: 24 June 1970
- Reference no.: 1064241

Crossness Pumping Station is a former sewage pumping station designed by the architect Charles Henry Driver for the Metropolitan Board of Works's chief engineer Sir Joseph Bazalgette. It is located at Crossness Sewage Treatment Works, at the eastern end of the Southern Outfall Sewer and the Ridgeway path in the London Borough of Bexley. Constructed between 1859 and 1865 by William Webster, as part of Bazalgette's redevelopment of the London sewerage system, it features spectacular ornamental cast ironwork, described by architectural historian Nikolaus Pevsner as "a masterpiece of engineering – a Victorian cathedral of ironwork". It was decommissioned in 1956. Subsequently the building has been extensively restored and was opened to the public in 2016.

It is adjacent to Erith Marshes, a grazing marsh, the northern part of which is designated as Crossness Nature Reserve. This provides a valuable habitat for creatures ranging from moths to small amphibians and water voles.

== Opening ==
The Southern Outfall Works, as the complex was originally called, was officially opened on 4 April 1865, by Edward, Prince of Wales, attended by Prince Alfred, the Duke of Cambridge, Prince Edward of Saxe-Weimar, the Archbishop of Canterbury, the Archbishop of York and the Lord Mayor of London, and many other persons of rank.

Following an address by Joseph Bazalgette, the Royal party toured the works and reservoirs, and the Prince then turned the wheel which started the engines and, as the Illustrated London News observed, "a sensible vibration was felt throughout the building, showing that the enormous beams, lifting-rods and flywheels were in operation."

== Operation ==
At Crossness, the incoming liquid was raised some 30 to 40 feet (9–12 m) by the application of four large steam driven pumps. The engines were of enormous size and power. They were built by James Watt & Co. to Joseph Bazalgette's designs and specification, and were named "Victoria", "Prince Consort", "Albert Edward" and "Alexandra".

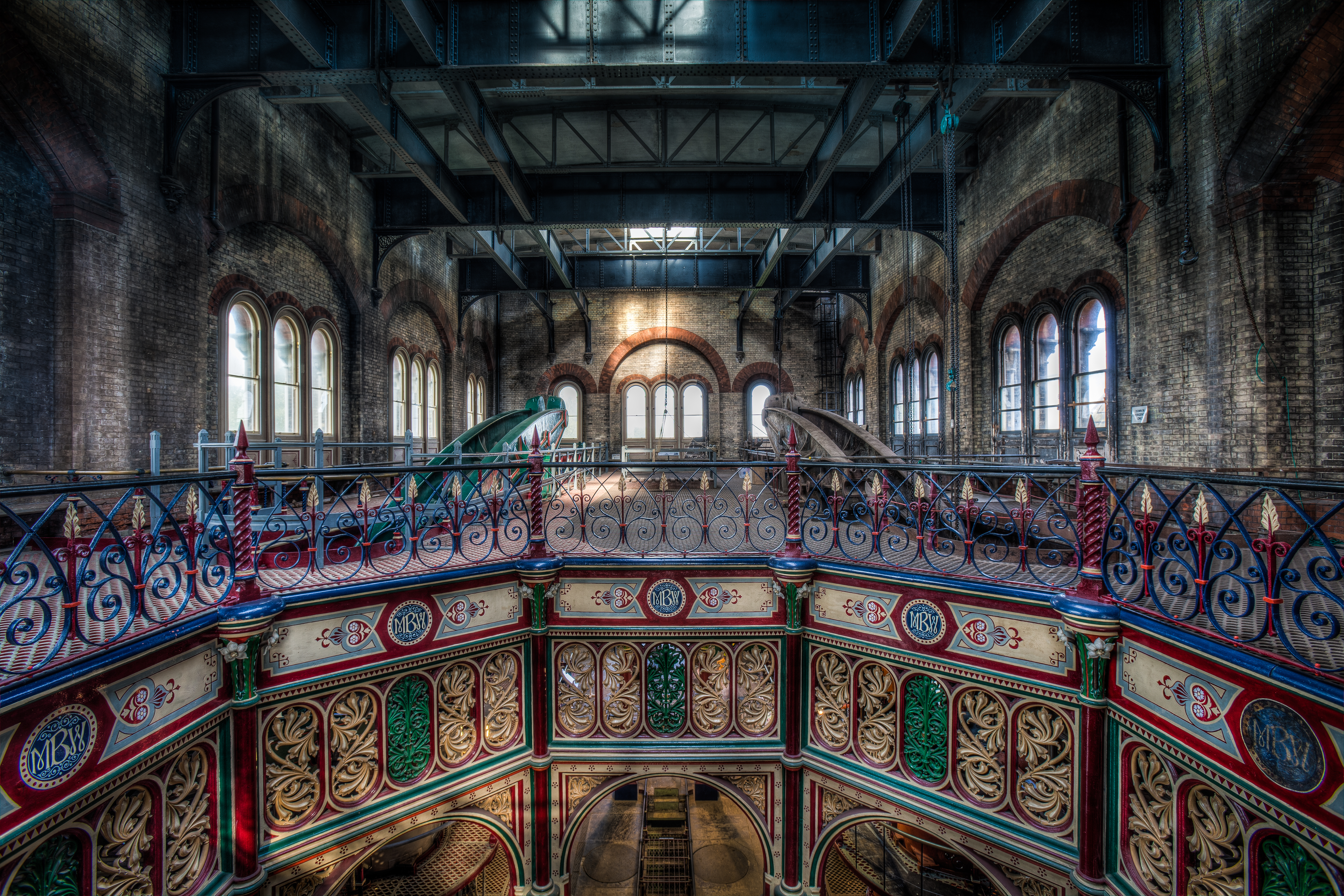
Interior of the pumping station

At 11 revolutions per minute, 6 tons (approximately 1,500 imp gal or 6,800 L) of sewage per stroke per engine were pumped up into a 27-million-imperial-gallon (120,000 m^{3}) reservoir, and was released into the Thames during the ebbing tide. The steam required to power these engines was raised by 12 Cornish boilers with single "straight-through" flues situated in the Boiler House to the south of the Engine House, and which consumed 5,000 tons of Welsh coal annually.

The Crossness Works merely disposed of raw sewage into the river seawards, and in 1882, a Royal Commission recommended that the solid matter in the sewage should be separated out, and that only the liquid portion remaining should be allowed, as a temporary measure, to pass into the river. In 1891, sedimentation tanks were added to the works, and the sludge was carried by steam boats and dumped further out into the estuary, at sea.

During the 1880s, chemical engineer William Webster developed a system for the electrolytic purification of sewage (patent application filed on 22 December 1887; US patent awarded on 19 February 1889), trialled in 1888 at the Southern Outfall works which had been built by his father's firm over 20 years earlier.

By 1897, additional pumping capacity was needed, and four extra pumps operated by triple-expansion steam engines were installed in an extension, designed to fit in with Bazalgette's main engine house, to the north of the older building. Later, in 1899, a further increase in London's population necessitated an increase in the efficiency of the original Watt engines, and considerable alteration to their design was carried out by Goodfellow & Co of Hyde, Manchester, for London County Council. They were converted from simple to compound engines, with the original single cylinders augmented by high and intermediate pressure cylinders. The additional steam required was provided by replacing the earlier Cornish boilers by more efficient Lancashire boilers with double flues and in 1901, the improved engines were fully working.

In 1913, the triple expansion steam engines were replaced by diesel engines, which are still to be seen in the triple expansion engine house, and by 1956, the Watt-Goodfellow engines had been decommissioned, (Prince Consort having been temporarily put back in steam in 1953 to assist with draining the flooding of the eastern Royal Arsenal and Abbey Wood) and were left, with the rest of the ironwork, to rust and to vandals.

== Restoration ==
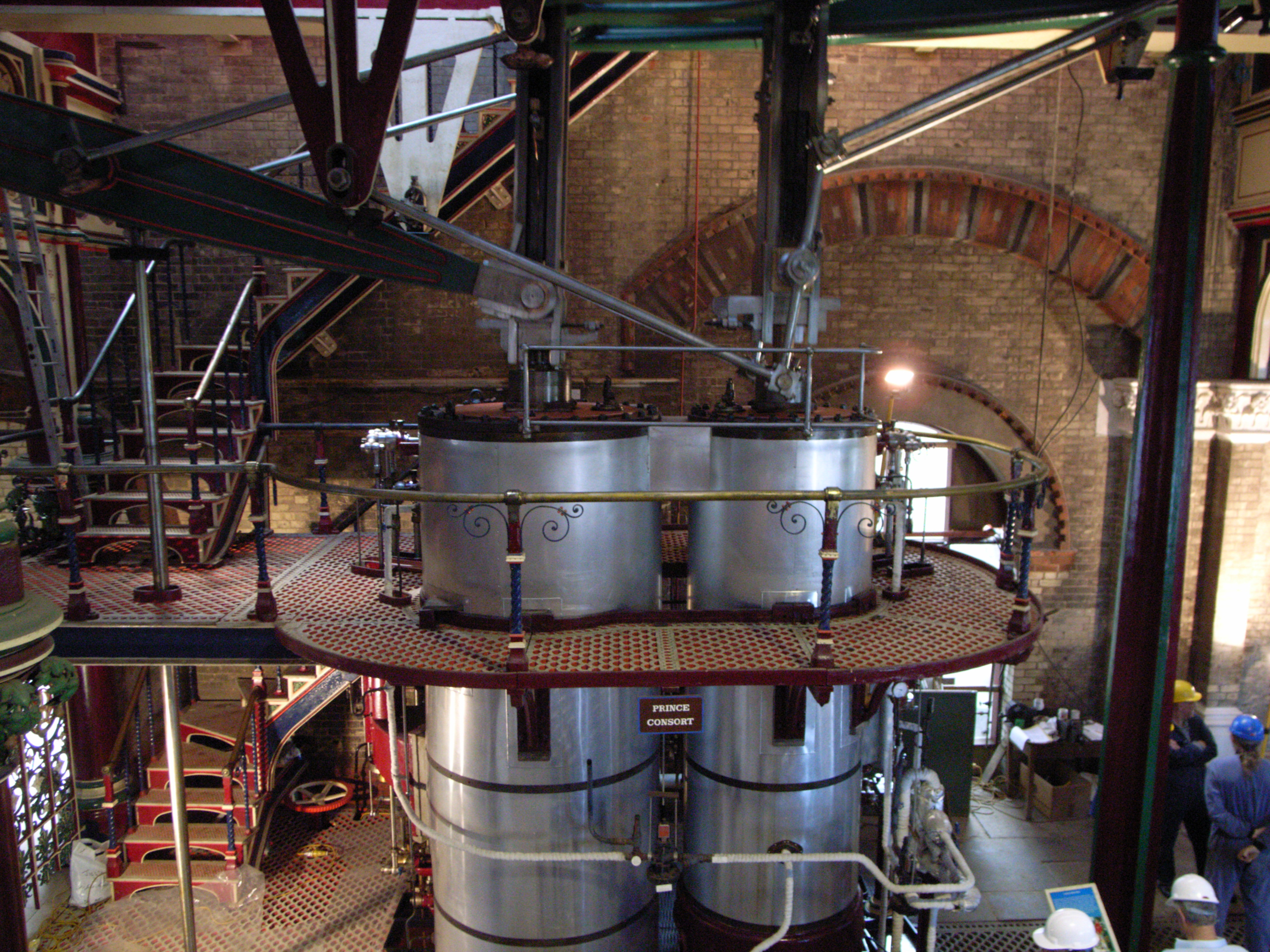
The Prince Consort pumping engine.

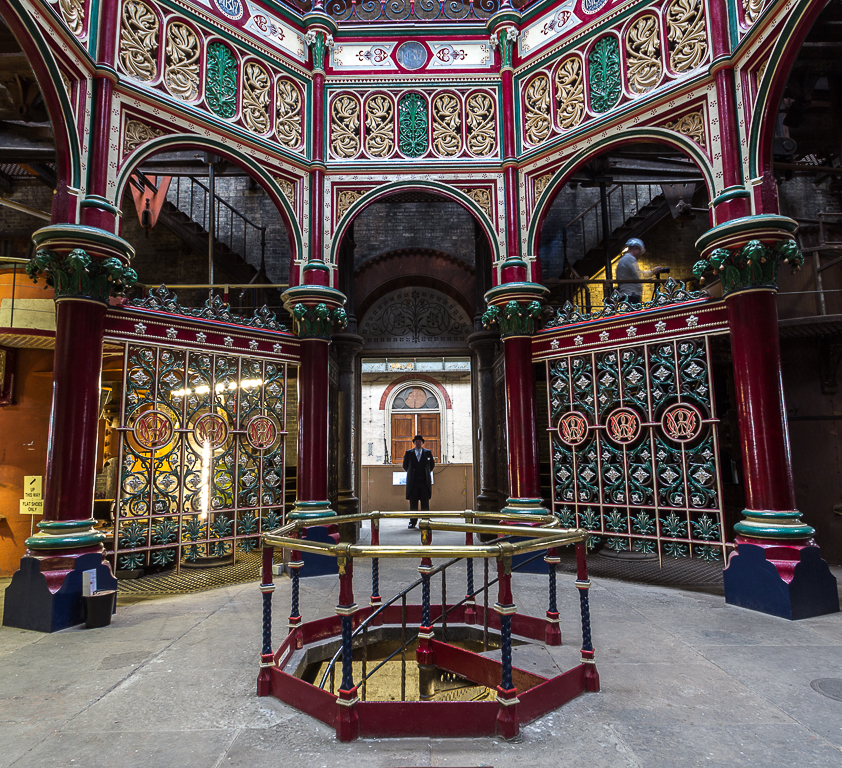
Elaborate decorative ironwork in the Octagon.

When the pumping station was decommissioned in the 1950s, it was not considered economic to dismantle the engines, as the cost of doing so far exceeded any scrap value. The more valuable metal items (made from brass), such as the engine oilers, much pipework, and even the handrails from the stairs, were removed. The remaining building and engines were left to decay and over the decades were subject to much vandalism.

The pumping station became a Grade I listed building in 1970 and remains on the Heritage at Risk Register. The Crossness Engines Trust, a registered charity, was formed in 1987 to oversee the restoration project. The four pumping engines are thought to be the largest remaining rotative beam engines in the world, with 52-ton flywheels and 47-ton beams.

As Prince Consort was the last steam engine decommissioned, in 1953, it is this engine on which the restoration activity has been concentrated. After fifteen years of effort, by 2003 the engine was in working order again and is run on the open days organised by the Trust. Work has since begun on the restoration of Victoria.

When the buildings were abandoned, the pumps and culverts and all the subterranean areas below the Beam Engine House were filled with sand to reduce the risks from methane. This has meant that some 100 tons of this sand has had to be excavated from around and underneath the pumps before there was any hope of moving the beam and flywheel. There was also a large ingress of rain water, resulting in serious rusting of the engine parts.

The original boilers did not survive, and Prince Consort is now steamed by a small "off the shelf" boiler. While it only has a fraction of the steam capacity of the originals, this is not a problem as the engine no longer operates under load.

=== Museum ===
Having received over £2 million in initial funding, including, in 2008, £1.5 million from the Heritage Lottery Fund, £150,000 from English Heritage and £700,000 in match funding from the Department for Communities and Local Government, work began at the site to build an access road, protect the buildings and to develop a museum. Financial and other support was also provided by Thames Water, Tilfen Land, the London Borough of Bexley and the City Bridge Trust.

A further £1.5 million in funding from the Heritage Lottery Fund was secured in April 2015, the 150th anniversary of Crossness's official opening. This was to help fund a museum exhibition focused on the "Great Stink" of 1858 and the role of Crossness in improving London's sewerage system.

Crossness Pumping Station was opened to the public in 2016. The Guardian described it as a "glorious monument to the towering genius of Victorian engineering."

== In popular culture ==
Prince Consort engine under steam

The 2003 BBC Series Seven Wonders of the Industrial World: The Sewer King episode featured a segment filmed in the pumping station.

The pumping station has been used as a filming location for the 2009 film Sherlock Holmes and for the 2011 BBC production of Michel Faber's The Crimson Petal and the White. The building was also used as the setting for the final mission of the video game The Getaway: Black Monday. The pumping station is used as the interior of Gustafson's factory in the 2020 film Jingle Jangle: A Christmas Journey, and was the location for the 2021 revival of GamesMaster.

== Gallery ==
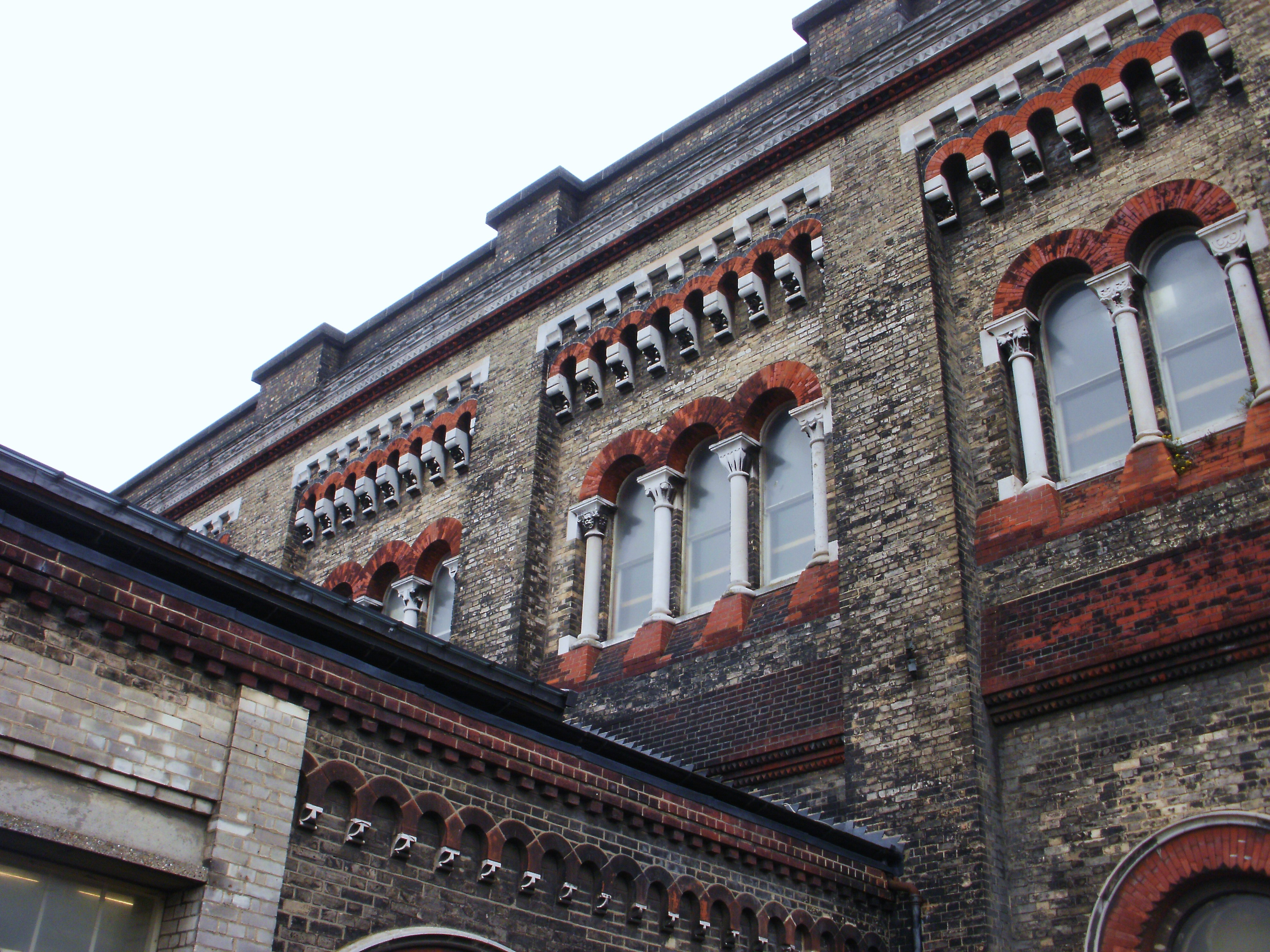
Exterior detail

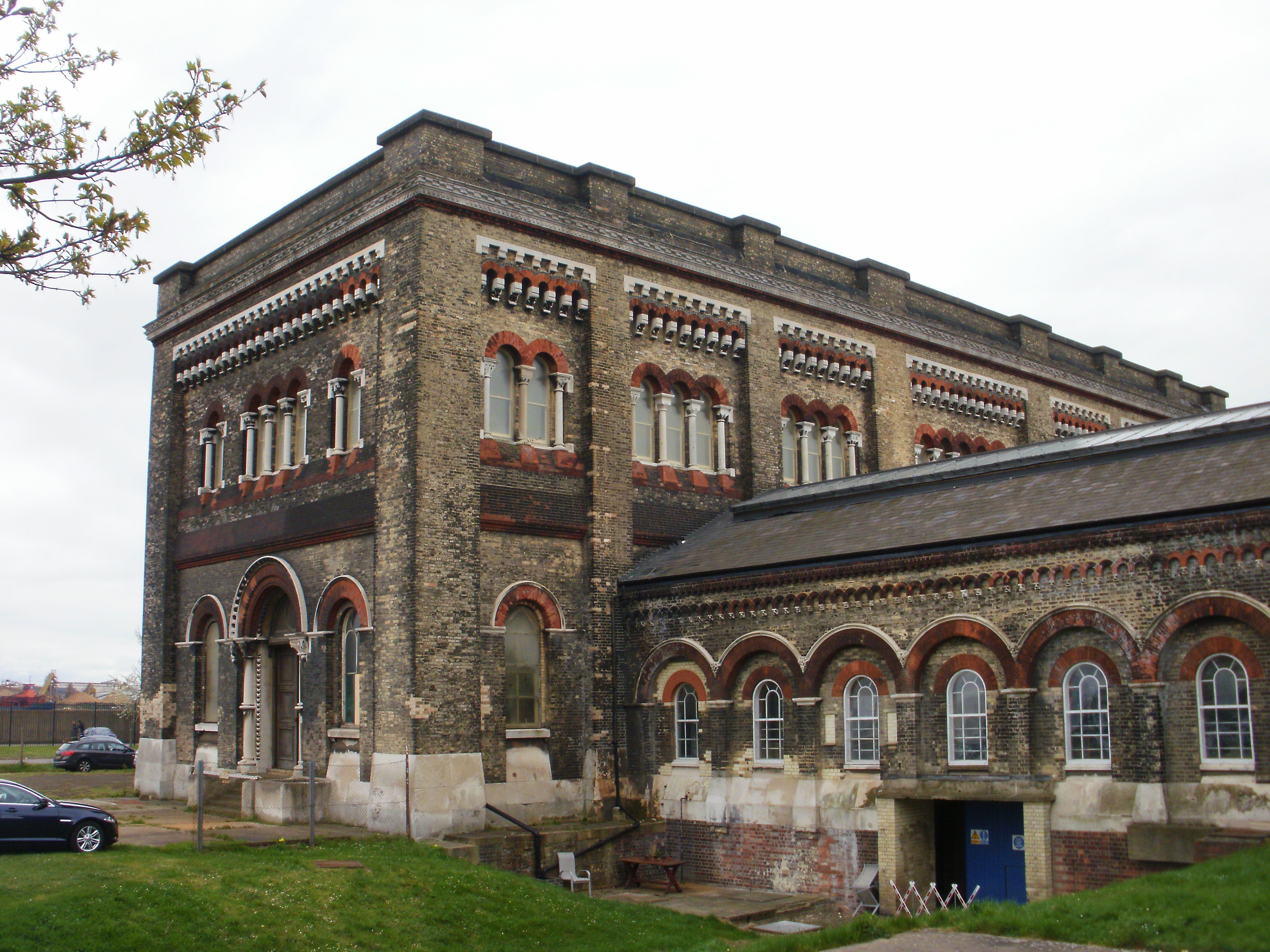
Exterior

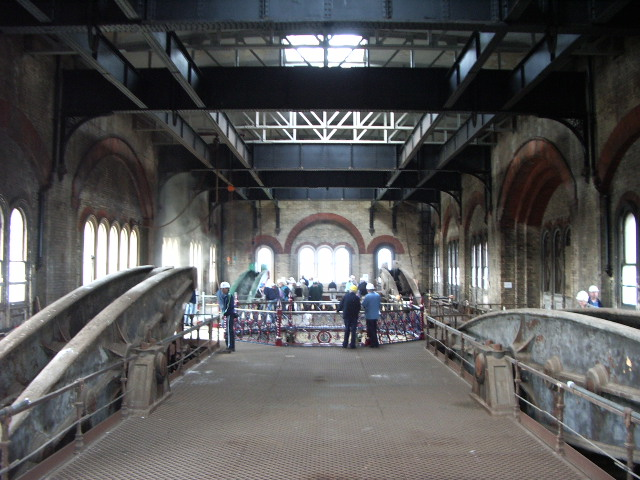
Beam Floor

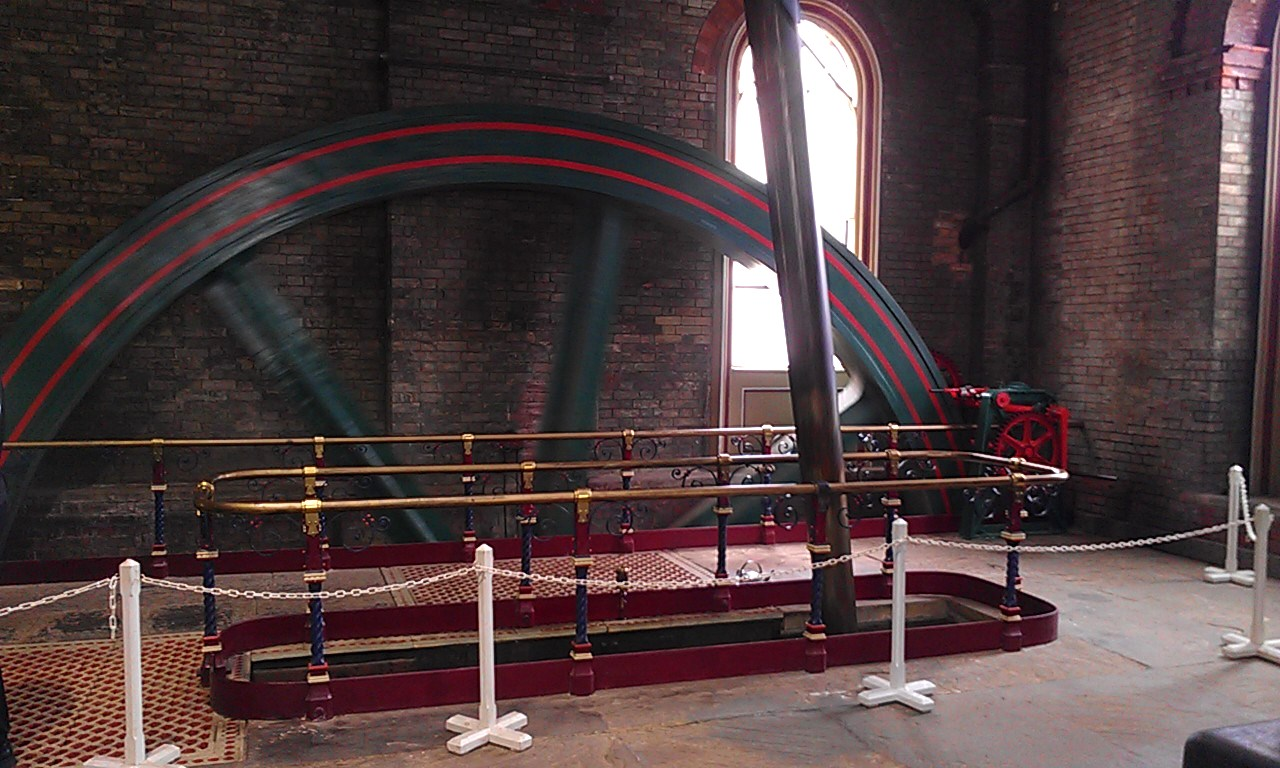
The Prince Consort fly wheel

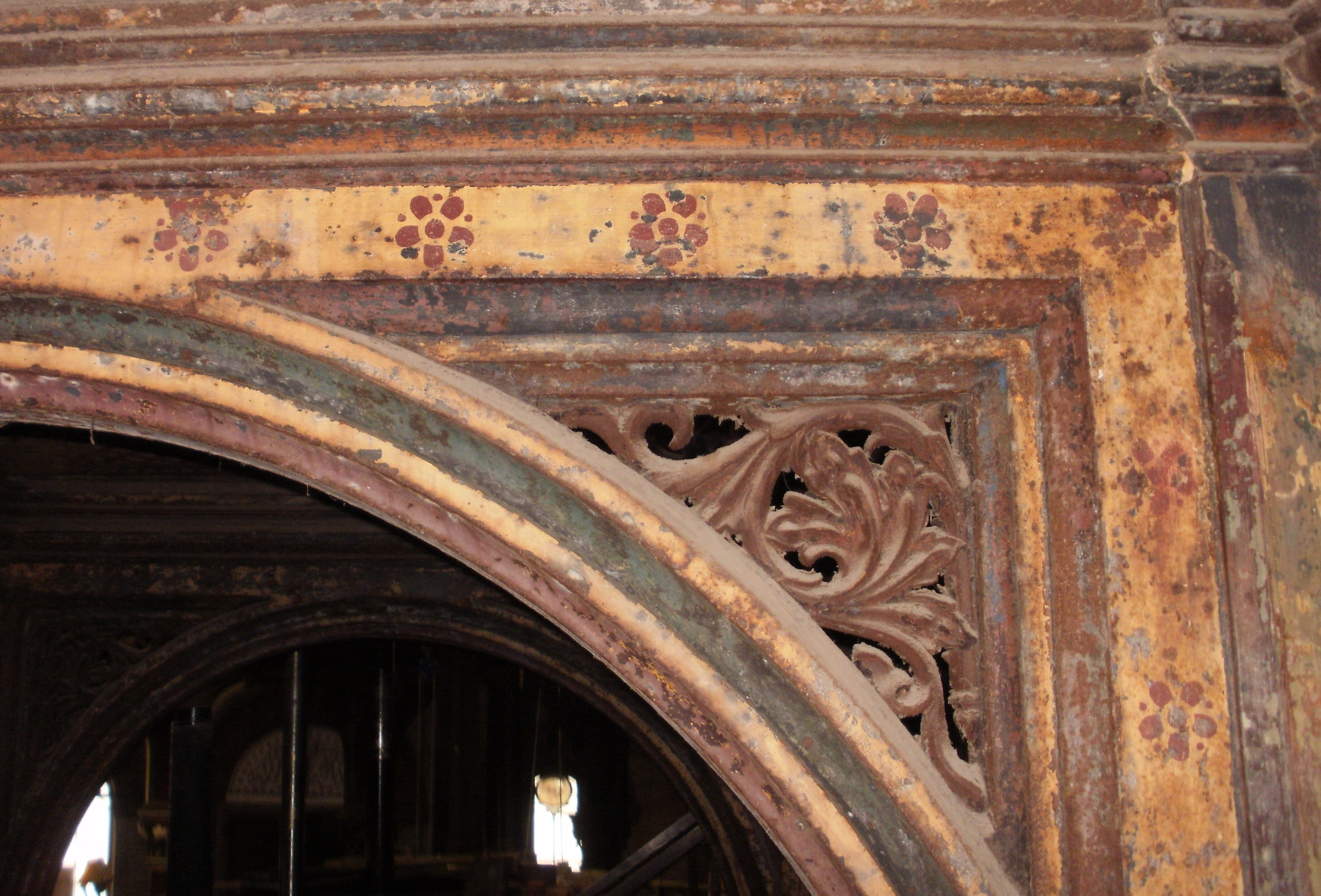
Interior original paintwork

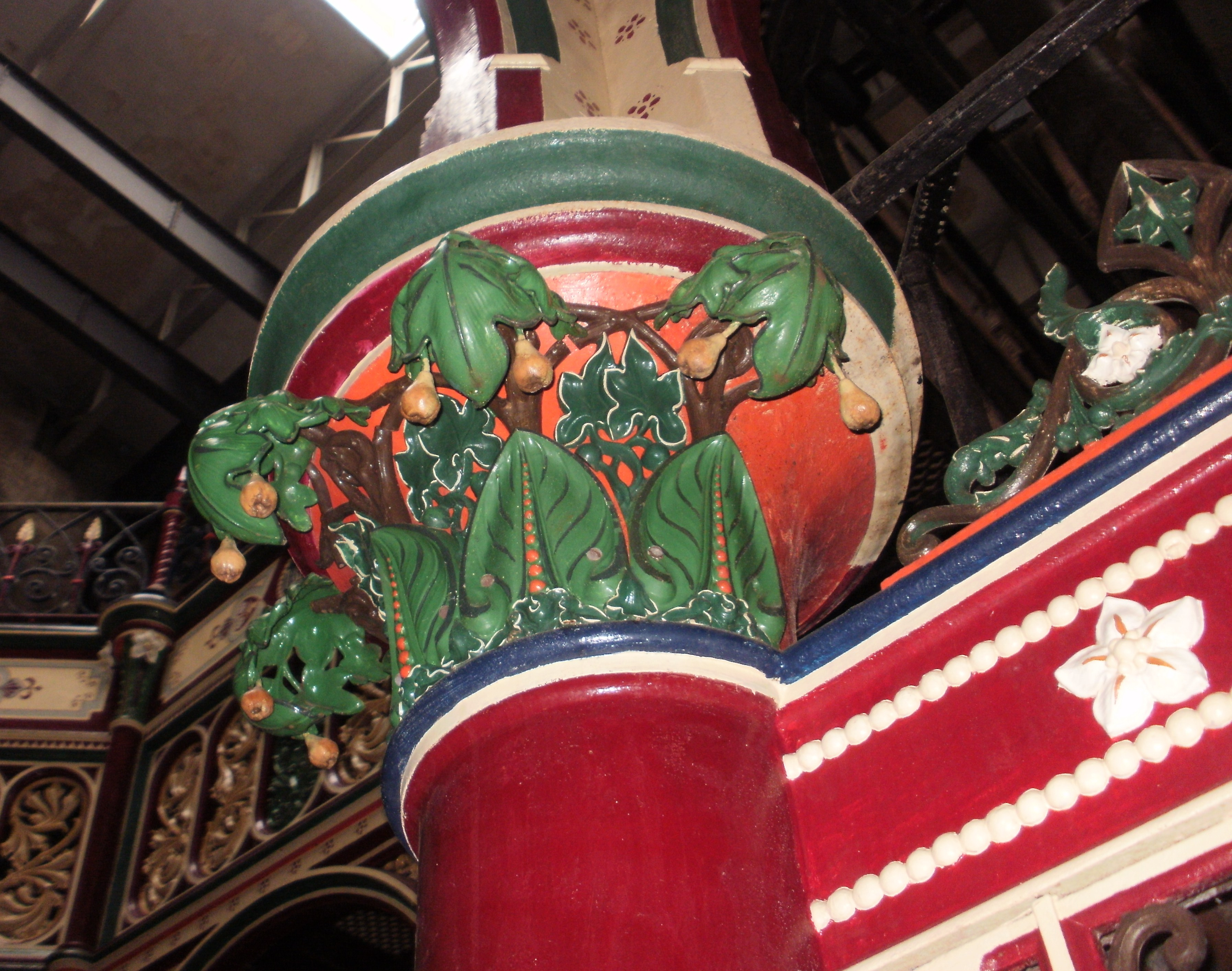
Restored decoration

== See also ==
- Abbey Mills Pumping Stations – a pumping station for the Northern Outfall Sewer.
- Markfield Beam Engine and Museum
