= Plumstead railway station =

National Rail station in London, England

Plumstead
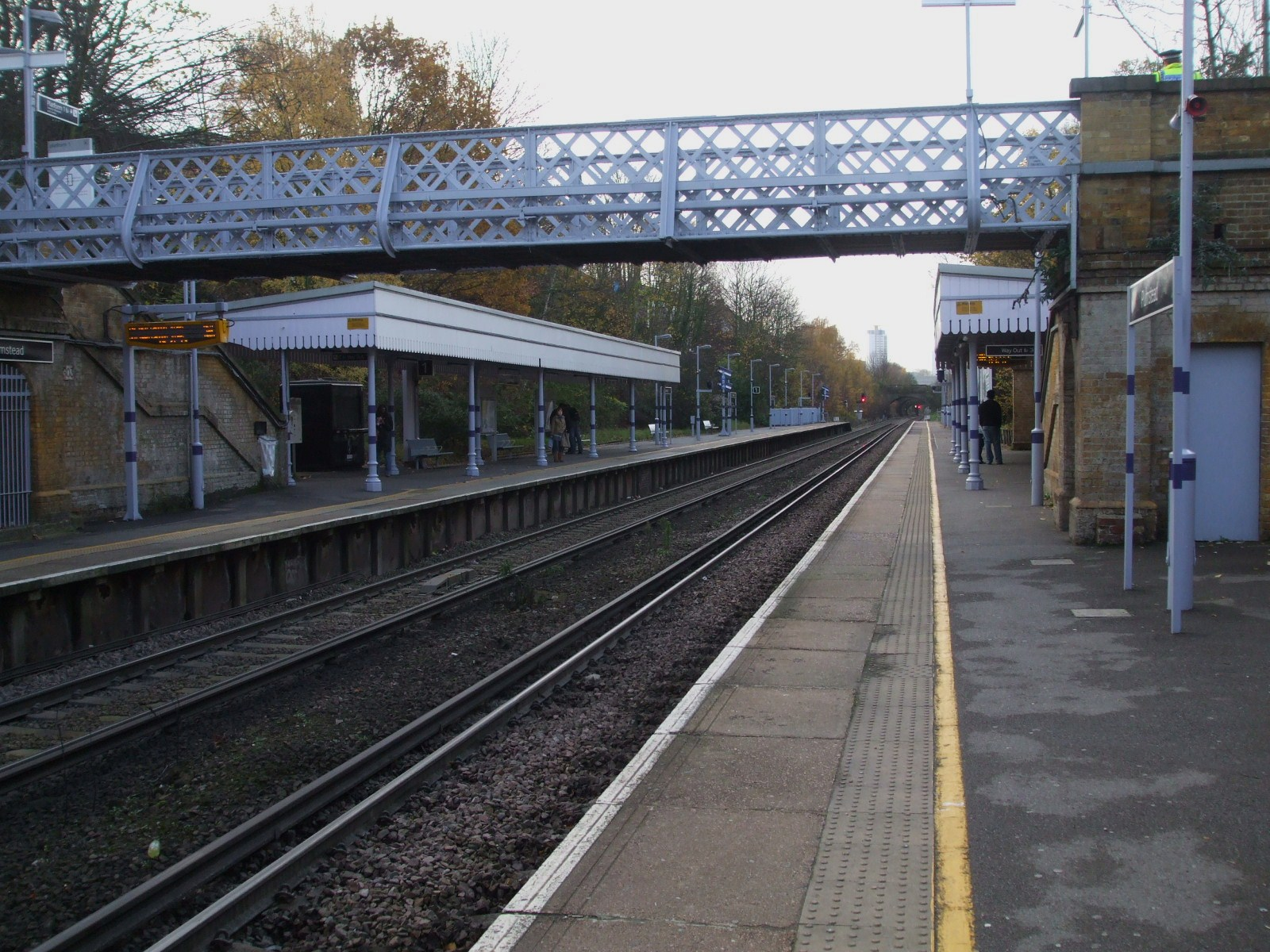
- Interactive map of Plumstead

General information
- Location: Plumstead
- Local authority: Royal Borough of Greenwich
- Managed by: Southeastern
- Station code: PLU
- DfT category: D
- Number of platforms: 2
- Accessible: Yes
- Fare zone: 4

National Rail annual entry and exit
- 2020–21: ▼0.622 million
- 2021–22: ▲1.225 million
- 2022–23: ▼1.006 million
- 2023–24: ▼0.874 million
- 2024–25: ▲0.923 million

Key dates
- 16 July 1859: Opened

Other information
- External links: Departures; Facilities
- Coordinates: 51.4897°N 0.0844°E

Plumstead railway station serves the suburb of Plumstead, in the Royal Borough of Greenwich, east of Woolwich Arsenal. It is 10 miles 1 chain (16.1 km) measured from London Charing Cross. It is managed by Southeastern and also served by Thameslink.

Plumstead is on the North Kent Line and was opened 10 years after the line opened on 16 July 1859. The platforms are below road level: the gabled station buildings stand on an overbridge at the country end. At this point, there are sidings: the station used to be where the railway system operating within the Royal Arsenal joined the main line.

There were plans for the Docklands Light Railway to be extended to Plumstead Railway Station. However, Woolwich Arsenal station was chosen instead.

The station is located at the western end of the Ridgeway pedestrian and cycle path, and is in London fare zone 4

In November 2024, £4.6 million worth of improvement works, including the installation of two new lifts at the station, were unveiled at the station, with the facilities officially opened by the local Member of Parliament, Abena Oppong-Asare MP.

== Services ==
Services at Plumstead are operated by Southeastern and Thameslink using Class 376, 465, 466, 700 and 707 EMUs.

The typical off-peak service in trains per hour is:

- 4 tph to London Cannon Street (2 of these run via Greenwich and 2 run via Lewisham)
- 2 tph to Luton via Greenwich
- 2 tph to Barnehurst, returning to London Cannon Street via Bexleyheath and Lewisham
- 2 tph to Dartford
- 2 tph to Rainham via Chatham

Additional services, including trains to and from London Cannon Street via Sidcup call at the station during the peak hours.

Preceding station	National Rail	Following station
Woolwich Arsenal	Southeastern North Kent Line	Abbey Wood
Woolwich Arsenal	Thameslink North Kent Line	Abbey Wood
	Historical railways	
Woolwich Arsenal	South Eastern and Chatham Railway North Kent Line	Church Manor Way Halt
