= Northern Outfall Sewer =

Sewer in London

Coordinates: 51°31′44″N 0°0′52″E

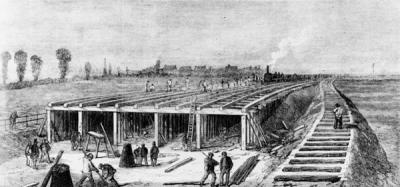
The Northern Outfall Sewer Under Construction

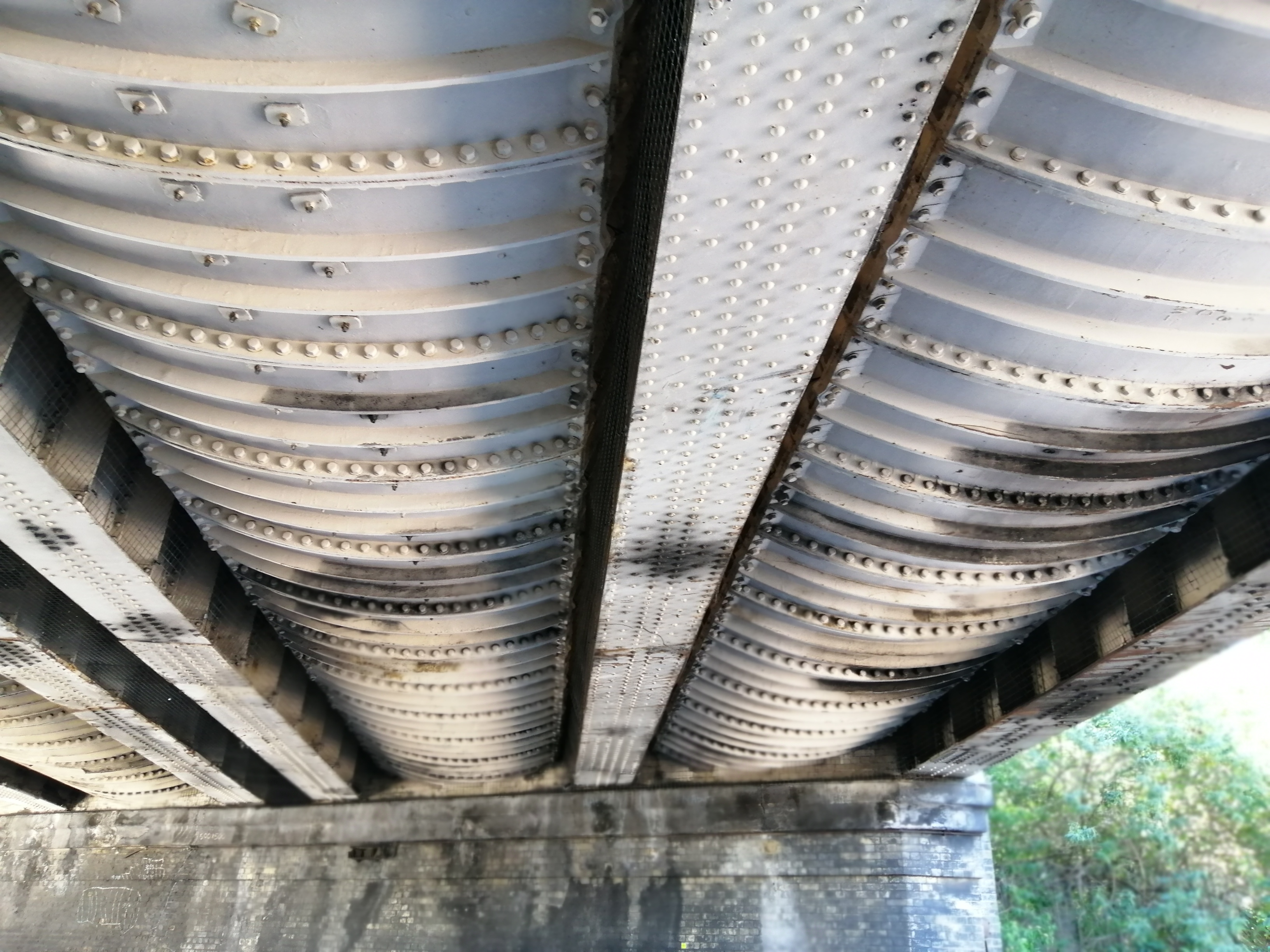
Northern Outfall Sewer (Greenway) over Manor Road A1011

The Northern Outfall Sewer (NOS) is a major gravity sewer which runs from Wick Lane in Hackney to the Beckton Sewage Treatment Works in east London. Most of it was designed by Joseph Bazalgette, as a result of an outbreak of cholera in 1853 and the "Great Stink" of 1858.

Prior to the work, drains in central London were built primarily to cope with rain water, but the growing use of flush toilets frequently meant that they became overloaded, causing sewage and industrial effluent to flow into the River Thames. Bazalgette's London sewerage system project included the construction of intercepting sewers north and south of the Thames. The Southern Outfall Sewer network diverts flows away from the Thames south of the river.

In total, five interceptor sewers were constructed north of the Thames. Three were built by Bazalgette, and two were added 30 years later:

- The northernmost (Northern High Level Sewer) begins on Hampstead Hill and is routed past Kentish Town and Stoke Newington and under Victoria Park to the start of the Northern Outfall Sewer at Wick Lane.
- Two middle level sewers serve parts of central London and also join the Northern Outfall Sewer at Wick Lane:
  - One begins close to Kilburn and runs along Edgware Road, Euston Road and past King's Cross, through Islington to Wick Lane.
  - The other runs from Kensal Green, under Bayswater and along Oxford Street, then via Clerkenwell and Bethnal Green to Wick Lane.
- Two low-level sewers stretch from west London:
  - One starts from near Ravenscourt Park, passes under Hammersmith and Kensington, Piccadilly, the Strand, Aldwych, the City and Aldgate to Abbey Mills Sewage Pumping Station.
  - The second begins in Hammersmith, crosses under Fulham and then runs along the King's Road and Cheyne Walk from where it becomes an integral part of the Thames Embankment. Western Sewage Pumping Station near Chelsea Bridge helps maintain the necessary gravity flow, taking sewage on along Millbank, the Victoria Embankment and Tower Hill, then north-east under Whitechapel, Stepney and Bow to Abbey Mills.

The flows from the two low-level sewers are raised by some 40 feet (12 m) into the Northern Outfall Sewer at Abbey Mills Pumping Station, to join the flows from the High and Middle Level sewers.

The remaining sections of the NOS carry the sewage from Abbey Mills to the treatment plant at Beckton. The creation of the NOS was a massive undertaking, and involved the construction of huge embankments and several bridges. Today, the eastern end of the Northern Outfall Sewer, running some 4 1/2 miles (7 km) from Wick Lane to Beckton, has been landscaped to form a public footpath/cycleway called The Greenway, with access points along its length.

== See also ==
- Crossness Pumping Station
- Southern Outfall Sewer
