= Bazalgette =

Bazalgette is a surname, originating in the Cévennes region of Southern France. It is believed that there is a single Bazalgette family that comes from the hamlet of La Bazalgette, situated midway between Mende and Ispagnac in the Lozère département. All those listed below are related and belong to the British branch of the family.

- Christopher Bazalgette (1938–2023), English cricketer
- Derek Bazalgette (1924–2007), Royal Navy officer
- Edward Bazalgette, lead guitarist of 1980s rock group the Vapors, BBC television producer and director and third cousin of Peter Bazalgette
- George Bazalgette, officer in the Royal Marines, and commander of the Royal Marines Light Infantry in colonial-era British Columbia
- Ian Willoughby Bazalgette (1918–1944), Lancaster bomber pilot, Squadron Leader DFC VC. The VC was because he stayed in his damaged Lancaster aircraft and tried to land it, but was killed. He was a descendant of Sir Joseph Bazalgette (see below)
- John Bazalgette (1784–1868), Lieutenant Governor of Nova Scotia
- Sir Joseph Bazalgette (1819–1891), Victorian civil engineer responsible for the London sewers
- Léon Bazalgette (1873–1928), French literary critic, biographer and translator
- Sir Peter Bazalgette (born 1953), great-great-grandson of Joseph, chairman of Endemol UK, and producer of Big Brother
- Simon Bazalgette (born 1962), group chief executive of The Jockey Club
- Charles Bazalgette (born 1944), Author of "Prinny's Taylor, the Life and Times of Louis Bazalgette, 1750-1830".

== See also ==
- Bazalgette Range, a mountain range in British Columbia named for George Bazalgette
