= Greenwich pumping station =

- Location within Royal Borough of Greenwich

General information
- Status: In use
- Type: Pumping station
- Architectural style: Italianate
- Location: 101 Greenwich High Road, London, England
- Coordinates: 51°28′38″N 0°01′06″W
- Construction started: 1865

Design and construction
- Engineer: Joseph Bazalgette

Listed Building – Grade II
- Designated: 16 December 1988
- Reference no.: 1213334

Greenwich Pumping Station, known until c. 1986 as Deptford Pumping Station, is a sewage pumping station in the London Borough of Greenwich built in 1865 to the east of Deptford Creek. It is part of the London sewerage system devised by Sir Joseph Bazalgette in the mid 19th century. Today operated by Thames Water, it is located on the western side of Norman Road, approximately 0.5 km (0.31 mi) south west of Greenwich town centre, on the eastern bank of Deptford Creek, around 0.5 km (0.31 mi) south of its confluence with the River Thames.

== History ==
After an outbreak of cholera in 1853 and "The Big Stink" of 1858, central London's sewerage system was designed by Joseph Bazalgette to intercept sewage flows and prevent them flowing into the Thames.

Deptford pumping station was constructed to raise sewage from the southern interceptor sewers by 18 ft (5.5 m) into the Southern Outfall Sewer, where it would flow onwards to Crossness Sewage Treatment Works. In the year 1919/20 the Deptford pumps handled 21,890.1 million imperial gallons (99,514,000 m^{3}) and the running costs were £28,818. Deptford was the south London equivalent of Abbey Mills pumping station, which performed a similar function for the Northern Outfall Sewer.

The original Deptford pumping station building, now a Grade II listed building, was built in London stock brick in an Italianate style, and comprised two engine houses with a linking boiler house. It initially housed four steam-powered beam engines (later replaced by diesel and electric pumps). When installed, the engines at Deptford were the largest ever built. Two adjacent coal sheds are also Grade II listed.

Over 150 years later, in the early 2020s, the Greenwich pumping station site was the location of a shaft used to drive the Greenwich connection tunnel to Chambers Wharf on the Thames Tideway Scheme, currently under construction, and intended to partly supersede Bazalgette's system.
