= Long Reach sewage treatment works =

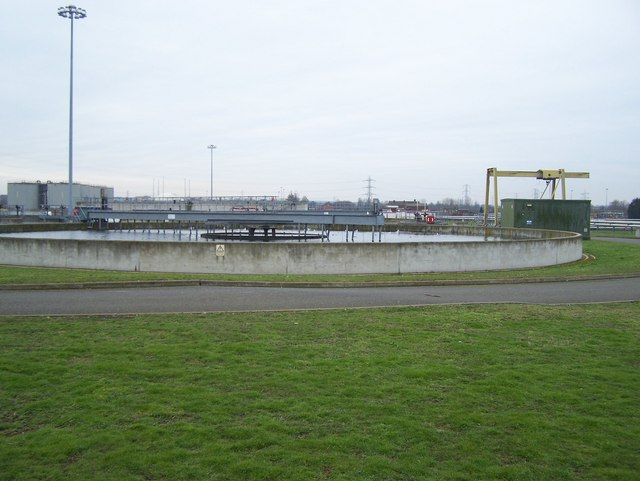
One of four large tanks in Sewage Works This sewage works is on the River Thames. Near Littlebrook power station.

The Long Reach sewage treatment works is located in Dartford, Kent adjacent to the River Thames. It treats the sewage from a population of 837,000 in a catchment area of 518 km^{2} (200 sq mi) in south and south east London and west Kent. The treatment capacity of the works is 346 million litres per day (Ml/d).

== Names ==
The Long Reach sewage treatment works was originally called the West Kent Outfall Works and later the West Kent sewage works. The name Long Reach refers to the so-named section of the River Thames where the sewage works is located (51.4675°N 0.2350°E).

== History ==
The West Kent Main Drainage Scheme was proposed by the West Kent Main Sewerage Board, founded in 1875, and was designed by Sir Joseph Bazalgette. The initial scheme was completed in 1879. It comprised a sewer from Beckenham to an outfall into the Thames on Dartford Marshes. The sewer was egg shaped six feet (1.83 m) by four feet (1.22 m) and ran 40 to 50 feet (12.2 to 15.2 m) below the ground surface. The main sewer was 58,528 feet (17.84 km) long, and the Cray Valley Branch Sewer was 34,736 feet (10.59 km) long. At the outfall the sewage could be discharged into the Thames at all states of the tide. The sewer was constructed of Portland cement concrete which was less expensive than brick. Bazalgette proposed that the sewer should be extended west to Croydon, Mitcham, Merton and Kingston.

== Operations ==
Initially no treatment of the sewage was undertaken, it was discharged directly into the Thames.

Later primary sedimentation tanks were added to separate solids from the liquid effluent. The works were expanded with new sedimentation tanks in 1926 and 1960. Sludge handling equipment was installed at various times between 1931 and 1951.

The operating parameters of the works 1950–1962 were as follows:

Operating parameters of the West Kent sewage works 1950–1962
Year	Discharge, million gallons per day	Biochemical Oxygen Demand (BOD), parts per million	BOD load, tons per day
1950–53	22.6	230	23.2
1954–56	23.8	221	23.5
1957–59	25.0	191	21.3
1960–62	28.9	220	28.3

West Kent works was in the top three or four largest sewage works that discharge into the tidal Thames.

Sewage works discharging into the tidal Thames, 1960-62
Sewage works	Flow		BOD load	
Sewage works	million gallons per day	Per cent	tons per day	Percent
Beckton	211	43.1	91	32.4
Crossness	109	22.3	95.5	34.0
Mogden	92.4	19.0	27	9.6
West Kent	28.9	5.9	28.3	10.0
18 others (sum)	47.7	9.7	39.2	14.0
Total	489	100	281	100

New works were designed in 1964 capable of treating a dry weather flow of 36 million gallons per day (164 Ml/d) and of giving an effluent with a biochemical oxygen demand of 20 parts per million (ppm).

By 2000 the works was a conventional activated sludge plant, with a capacity of 311 Ml/d. The catchment area includes: Bexley, Bromley, Croydon, Dartford Sevenoaks, Tandridge, and Tonbridge and Malling. The works comprised:

- Fine screens
- Constant velocity grit channels
- Screening conditioning and grit washing plant
- Primary sedimentation tanks
- Aeration lanes using diffused air aeration
- Final settlement tank
- Return activated sludge facilities
- Sludge treatment
- Storm tank
- Pumping stations

In 2000 the power station at the works was destroyed in a fire. A combined heat and power biogas power station was built. The station used biogas from the sewage to generate by gas engines 2.3 MW of electricity which is sufficient for the sewage works load of 1.8 MW with surplus exported to the National Grid. In addition the power station generates 2 MW of heat for the digester load.

In association with the Thames Tideway Scheme an upgrade to the works was commissioned in 2012. New plant included:

- Three aeration lanes (80 m long, 8.3 m wide, 6 m deep) and new blowers
- Two 15 m diameter picket fence thickeners
- Two belt thickeners
- Odour control units comprising a primary biofilter and secondary dry carbon polisher
- Upgrades to the existing blowers

These works increased the capacity of the works to 346 Ml/day.

Sludge from the works was used for agricultural purposes. In 2015 a thermal hydrolysis unit was commissioned.

== Owners ==
The works was owned by the West Kent Main Sewerage Board from 1875 to 1974. It was then owned by the Thames Water Authority, and from 1989 by Thames Water.

== See also ==
- London sewer system
