= Thames Tideway Tunnel =

Sewerage upgrade project in London, England

Overview
- Location: Inner London
- Status: Completed
- Start: Acton
- End: Lee Tunnel, Abbey Mills, near Stratford

Operation
- Work began: 2016
- Constructed: Various (see article)
- Opened: 7 May 2025
- Owner: Bazalgette Tunnel Ltd; (trading as Tideway)
- Operator: Bazalgette Tunnel Ltd
- Character: Combined sewer

Technical
- Design engineer: Various (see article)
- Length: 25 km (16 mi)
- Max elevation: −30 m (−98 ft) at Acton
- Min elevation: −70 m (−230 ft) at Abbey Mills
- Width: 7.2 m (24 ft)
- CSOs intercepted: 34
- Cost: £5 billion (2024 estimate)

The Thames Tideway Tunnel is a deep-level sewer along the tidal section of the River Thames in London, running 25 kilometres (16 miles) from Acton in the west to Abbey Mills in the east, where it joins the Lee Tunnel which connects to Beckton Sewage Treatment Works. The tunnel is designed to capture almost all the raw sewage and rainwater from combined sewers which would otherwise overflow into the river during heavy rain. The sewage can be stored in the tunnel until it can be treated at Beckton.

Bazalgette Tunnel Limited (BTL), backed by investors Allianz, Amber Infrastructure, Dalmore Capital and DIF, is the licensed infrastructure provider for the tunnel's finance, building, maintenance and operation. On 3 November 2015, the license award was made by Ofwat, ensuring the start of the project. Since then, BTL also trades as Tideway.

Construction of the Tideway Tunnel began in 2016 and the project was due to be completed by 2024, but the COVID-19 pandemic delayed this to early 2025. The first sewage flowed into the tunnel in September 2024. It became fully operational in February 2025, and was officially opened in May 2025.

The estimated capital cost – excluding financing, operations and maintenance – was £3.8bn with an additional £1.1bn for preparatory works. Due to the COVID-19 pandemic, additional costs of £233m were incurred. The 2021-22 annual report gave an updated cost of £4.3bn. The final cost was £5bn.

The main tunnel has an internal diameter of 7.2 m (24 ft) and runs at a depth of between 30 m (98 ft) at the western end, and 70 m (230 ft) in the east. The tunnel drains 34 of the most polluting combined sewer overflows and is expected to lead to the overflows operating for 3.7% of the time on a maximum of four days per year at the time of commissioning.

== Background ==
Built between 1859 and 1875, Sir Joseph Bazalgette's original London sewerage system was designed to capture both rainwater and the sewage produced by four million people. As a failsafe, to prevent sewage backing up and flooding people's homes, Bazalgette's system had the ability to overflow into the Thames via 57 combined sewer overflows (CSOs) along the banks of the river.

In 2001, London's population density was 18,457 people per square kilometre, compared to just 6,825 per square kilometre in Bazalgette's day. As the population grew, so did development, and this altered the natural drainage of the sewerage catchment so that more rainfall flowed into London's sewers, rather than being naturally absorbed into permeable ground. A permeable area twice the size of Hyde Park was lost to hard surfacing every year up to 2001.

In the 2011 census returns Greater London hosted just over 8.1 million residents and Thames Water in a leaflet of that year explained how its works and how sewers needed expansion. The older inner boroughs have combined sewerage systems which cannot cope with the extra hard standings. As London continued to grow the new developments and suburbs were equipped with separated foul water and rainwater drainage pipe work. Extending such separate systems would stop sewage flooding of homes and businesses, as well as into the rivers and the estuary, would reduce carbon emissions, and be cheaper in the long term, than the multitude of pumped water tanks otherwise needed to stop homes flooding plus the Tideway tunnel. Pipes would be laid in a number of streets in each borough each year over say twenty years, limiting traffic diversions. By 2011 overflows into the river took place more than once a week and as little as 2 mm of rainfall could trigger a discharge. The mean total of this was 39,000,000 m^{3} (3.9×10^{10} L), that is 39 million tonnes, of storm sewage entering the river. These discharges, a mixture of raw sewage and rainwater, needed to be cut to comply with the EU's Waste Water Treatment Directive (UWWTD). If cut to such levels, it would restore the ecology of the river to that of 1865–70 or better, that is, before such growth took place.

== Options assessment ==
Instigated in 2001, the Thames Tideway Strategic Study, conducted by a group comprising Thames Water, the Environment Agency, DEFRA and the Greater London Authority, was intended to assess the impact of the CSO discharges into the Thames and to identify objectives and propose potential solutions, while keeping costs and benefits in mind.

=== Outcomes ===
After four years, the Thames Tideway Strategic Study report was published in 2005, and outlined the following objectives:

1. To protect the ecology of the Tideway;
2. To reduce aesthetic pollution due to sewage-derived litter; and
3. Protect the health of recreational water users

=== Potential strategies ===
Four potential strategies were discussed:

1. Adoption of source control and sustainable urban drainage;
2. Separation of foul and surface drainage and local storage;
3. Screening, storage or treatment at the discharge point to river; and
4. In-river treatment

After evaluation of alternatives it was decided that only one strategy, the screening, storage or treatment at the point of discharge, would meet the estuary objectives fully. The remainder were found to be either impractical or insufficient to provide a solution, although the evidence from the outer London Boroughs is that separated storm drainage can sustainably prevent all pollution. In a 2006 report commissioned for Ofwat, Jacobs Babtie strongly recommended using the computer model of the existing system to do detailed studies of the effects of laying separate storm water pipes, but their advice and that from Ofwat in 2007 concerning the poor value of the tunnel was not followed. A number of parties questioned the integrity of the TTSS study, in particular the dismissal of separation and future SUDs/blue-green infrastructure as a solution. Some groups that opposed the tunnel stated that it is an unsustainable 19th-century solution to a 21st-century problem. They argued that rainwater from roads should be sent directly to canals, rivers or the estuary, and that landowners could install soakaways for their roof run off, making them eligible for discounted water treatment bills. This would reduce pressure on the foul system and take away the need for the tunnel. In November 2010 the draft National Policy Statement for Waste Water (NPSWW) was issued, and eventually published largely unaltered, despite Parliamentary objections that it promoted the Tideway Tunnel as the only solution.

=== Screening, storage and treatment ===
The three-part solution to implement screening, storage and treatment was collectively known as the London Tideway Improvements.

==== Stratford to Beckton: Lee Tunnel ====
This earliest phase was the Lee Tunnel: a deep, broad storage and conveyance tunnel dug and lined from Jenkins Lane, Beckton to Abbey Mills, Stratford, sloping down the reverse way. This 6.9 km (4.3 mi) tunnel, running down to 75 m (246 ft) deep from Abbey Mills to Beckton is forecast to capture 16,000,000 m^{3} (1.6×10^{10} L), or 16 million tonnes annually from the greatest-polluting CSO point in London. Thames Water awarded the £635 million construction contract to the MVB joint venture of Morgan Sindall, VINCI Construction Grands Projets and Bachy Soletanche, in January 2010. Construction began in 2010 and on 28 January 2016 the Mayor of London, Boris Johnson, confirmed the tunnel open.

==== Sewage treatment works modernisation ====
The second part was the £675 million project to modernise and extend London's five major sewage treatment works to treat more sewage, thus greatly reducing the need for storm discharges to the river:

- Mogden Sewage Treatment Works – a £140 million upgrade to extend treatment capacity by 50%
- Crossness Sewage Treatment Works – a £220 million upgrade to extend treatment capacity by 44%
- Beckton Sewage Treatment Works – a £190 million upgrade to extend treatment capacity by 60%
- Riverside Sewage Treatment Works – an £85 million upgrade to improve water quality and produce renewable energy on site
- Long Reach Sewage Treatment Works – a £40 million upgrade in Dartford

These intend to improve the standard to which the sewage is treated, thus improving the Tideway's water quality.

==== Acton to Stratford ====
The final part is the Thames Tideway Tunnel, which intercepts outflows from London's most polluting CSOs, stores them and directs (conveys) them to sewage treatment works for processing.

== Thames Tideway Tunnel planning and consultation ==
=== Initial design and phase 1 consultation ===
Following the Thames Tideway Strategic Study, Thames Water consulted with relevant authorities to get feedback from stakeholders who would potentially be affected by the construction of the Thames Tideway Tunnel. Thames Water sought feedback on the proposed tunnel routes and potential locations of construction sites.

Three tunnel routes were considered:

1. River Thames Route – such an alignment, broadly, would follow the river from west London to Beckton STW and would cut across the Greenwich Peninsula, reducing the length of the tunnel where there are no CSOs to be intercepted.
2. Rotherhithe Route – a similar alignment, but this would have cut additionally across the Rotherhithe Peninsula, reducing the length of the main tunnel by approximately 1.8 km (1.1 mi) but requiring longer connection tunnels from some CSOs.
3. Abbey Mills Route – this route would connect the Thames Tunnel to the head of the Stratford to East Ham part at Abbey Mills Pumping Station. This would follow the same route but deviate north-east to Abbey Mills. The main tunnel length would be about 9 km (5.6 mi) less than the River Thames Route and save about £900 million.

=== Route and sites selection ===
A long list of 373 potential sites was created using a desktop survey of the land on either side of the 34 most polluting CSOs (as identified in the Thames Tideway Strategic Report). These sites were then further evaluated against more detailed planning, engineering, environmental, property and community considerations resulting in a shortlist of sites.

The three tunnel routes, as well as the shortlist of sites, were then put out for consultation between September 2010 and January 2011. In total 2,389 feedback forms (both online and hard copy), 480 pieces of correspondence and five petitions were received.

In response to the comments received, changes and improvements to some of the sites, including the potential use of alternative sites and alternative technical solutions, were considered. Based on this a round of interim engagement took place from March to August 2011. Residents around 11 specific sites were sent letters explaining that these sites were being considered as alternative sites, and invited to attend drop-in sessions to pose questions and gain a better understanding of the project. In total ten two-day sessions and one community liaison meeting were held. These were attended by over 800 people. In all 168 comment cards and 147 pieces of site specific correspondence were received and considered.

Based on this first round of consultation and interim engagement it was recommended that, for the project to be as cost-effective as possible and cause the least disruption, while still meeting the requirements of the UWWTD, the preferred scheme for the Thames Tideway Tunnel would need to involve:

- the Abbey Mills route
- a main tunnel 23 km (14 mi) long with an internal diameter of 7.2 m (24 ft);
- direct interception of 21 CSOs;
- indirect interception of a further 12, and a local solution for the remaining CSO;
- selection of five out of 52 possible access shafts to be built including three to be combined with CSO interception; and
- selection of seventeen out of 71 CSO alternate positionings from the final shortlist.

The new preferred route and sites were then sent out for a second round of public consultation and feedback.

=== Phase 2 and targeted consultation ===
The second phase of consultation was carried out between November 2011 and February 2012 when local authorities, land owners, local businesses and communities were consulted on:

- The need for the project and whether a tunnel was the most appropriate solution
- The preferred tunnel route (including the detailed alignment of the tunnel)
- Preferred sites and permanent works (taking into account the feedback received from the first phase of consultation such as the move from greenfield to brownfield sites)
- Detailed proposals for the preferred sites (again taking into account feedback from the phase one consultation)
- The effects the project would have (as outlined in the preliminary environmental information report)

A total of 1,374 feedback forms (online and hard copy), 4,636 pieces of correspondence and nine petitions were received.

Following this consultation, and taking into consideration all the feedback received, the proposed route was finalised as the Abbey Mills route and the preferred construction and drive sites were identified. Several sites were also identified as needing further, targeted consultation which resulted in further refinement and improvement of designs at those sites.

==== Site list and type ====
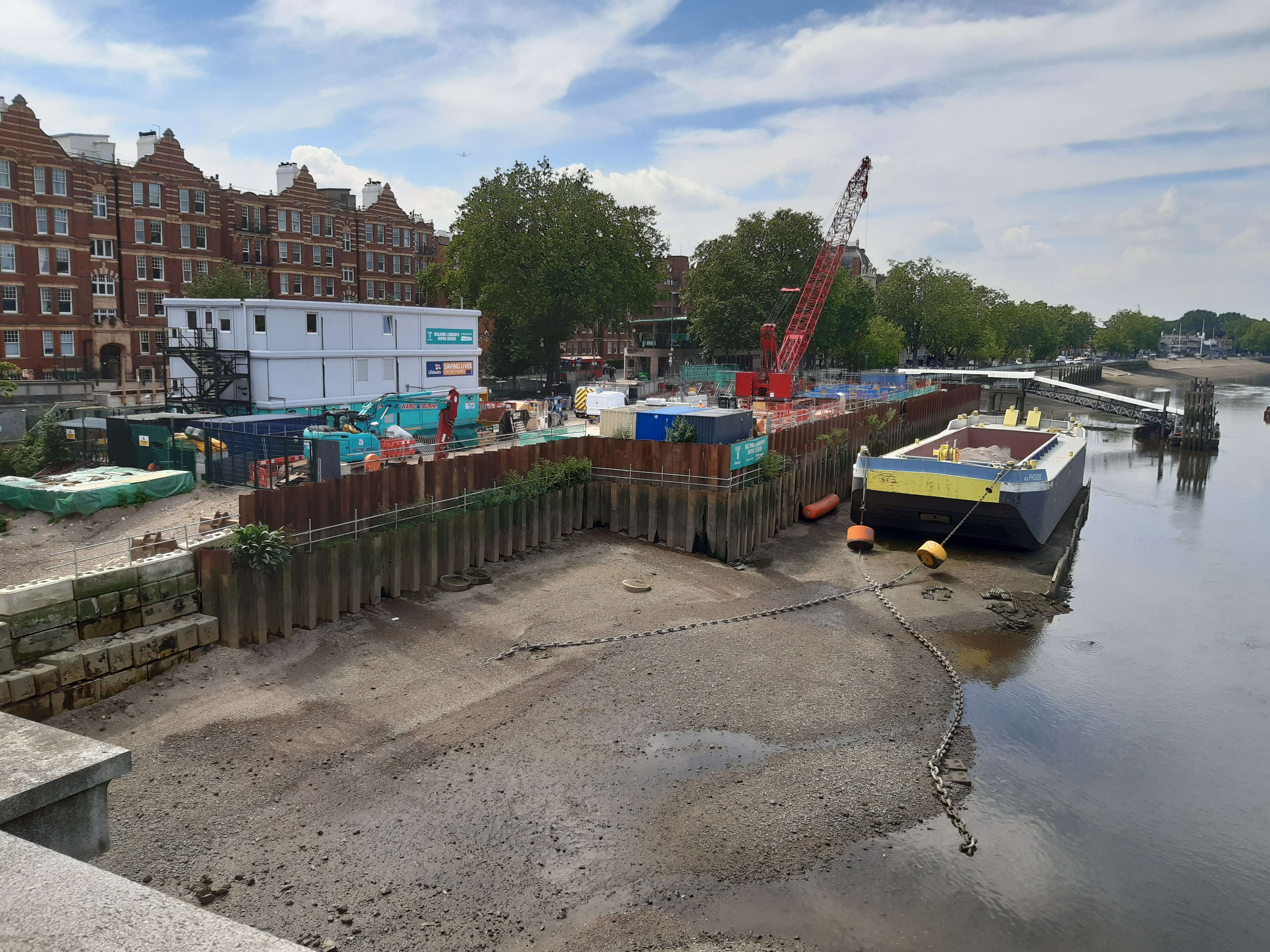
Thames Tideway construction site, Putney, 2021

- Acton Storm Tanks – main tunnel reception and CSO interception
- Hammersmith pumping station – CSO interception and connection tunnel drive site
- Barn Elms – CSO interception and connection tunnel drive site
- Putney Embankment foreshore – CSO interception and connection tunnel drive site
- Carnwath Road riverside – main tunnel drive and reception and connection tunnel reception site
- Dormay Street CSO – interception and connection tunnel drive site
- King George's Park – CSO and connection tunnel reception site
- Falconbrook pumping station – CSO and connection tunnel drive site
- Cremorne Wharf Depot – CSO interception and connection tunnel drive site
- Chelsea Embankment foreshore – CSO interception and connection tunnel drive site
- Kirtling Street – main tunnel double drive site
- Heathwall pumping station – CSO interception and connection tunnel drive site
- Albert Embankment foreshore – CSO interception and connection tunnel drive site
- Victoria Embankment foreshore – CSO interception and connection tunnel drive site
- Blackfriars Bridge foreshore – CSO interception site
- Shad Thames pumping station – system modification site
- Chambers Wharf – main tunnel drive and reception site
- Earl pumping station – CSO interception site
- Deptford Church Street – CSO interception site
- Greenwich pumping station – CSO interception and connection tunnel drive site
- King Edward Memorial Park – CSO interception site
- Bekesbourne Street – system modification site
- Abbey Mills pumping station – main tunnel reception site

==== Proposed design and construction ====
To build the Thames Tideway Tunnel, four tunnel boring machines (TBMs) were needed to excavate the main tunnel plus two others for smaller connection tunnels. It also required two types of construction sites: main tunnel sites, where the TBM was either launched or received, and CSO sites, where interception tunnels and a connection culvert were built to connect the existing sewer to the new tunnel.

Construction of the shafts at the CSO sites, to transfer flows from the existing sewer to the tunnel, would vary depending on the depth, the amount of flow they need to carry and the geology. The shaft would be a concrete cylinder with an internal diameter of 6–24 m (20–79 ft) and 20–60 m (66–197 ft) deep. Ventilation structures at CSO sites to allow air in and out of the shaft were also required. Construction at these sites was expected to take between 2½ and 3½ years and once complete each site would be landscaped.

At the main drive sites, four main activities took place: shaft construction (where a concrete cylinder 25–30 m (82–98 ft) in diameter and about 40–60 m (130–200 ft) deep was constructed), tunnelling preparations (preparing the site for arrival of the TBM), TBM assembly and lowering into the shaft, and then driving the TBM to excavate the main tunnel.

As the TBM moved forward, precast concrete segments were brought in and fixed together to create the tunnel wall. Excavated material would be transported out the tunnel via a conveyor belt and processed before being taken off-site. In order to minimise disruption, Thames Water committed to use the river as much as possible to transport materials both in and out of the construction sites. At the main tunnelling sites, work was expected to occur 24 hours a day.

In 2017, the public voted on a short-list of 17 to name the six TBMs. They were named after female pioneers of their fields linked to where each began to dig. One began tunnelling from Fulham in 2018, the Rachel Parsons, after the engineer and advocate for women's employment rights, who set up the first women-only engineering company in Fulham. The others were cryobiologist Audrey 'Ursula' Smith and suffragist Millicent Fawcett for the Central area and suffragist Charlotte Despard for the Frogmore Connection Tunnel from Wandsworth to Fulham. The TBM for the east section from Bermondsey was named after doctor Selina Fox who set up Bermondsey Medical Mission for Southwark's poor and disadvantaged residents. The machine for the Greenwich Connection Tunnel was named after Annie Scott Dill Russell, the first female scientist to work at the Greenwich Observatory.

=== Planning application ===
In October 2012, the deadline of the tunnels' Section 48 consultation closed. This lasted 12 weeks and was the last opportunity for the public to have their say on the updated proposal.

The Application for Development Consent – for the final, detailed plan for the construction – was delivered to the Planning Inspectorate on 28 February 2013. The Inspectorate then had 28 days to decide whether the application was valid and whether the consultation undertaken was adequate. On 27 March 2013, it was decided that the application was valid and that Thames Water's consultation for the project had been adequate. All the application documents were made available in their own section of the Planning Inspectorate's National Infrastructure website. Thames Water also made the documents available for scrutiny at six public places along the route, three either side of the river.

On 3 June 2013, it was announced that the Secretary of State for Communities and Local Government had appointed inspectors Jan Bessell, Libby Gawith, Emrys Parry, Andrew Phillipson and David Prentis as the examining authority to consider any matters arising. As part of this process, interested parties were able to make representations.

A preliminary meeting, open to those who had registered an interest, began on 12 September 2013 at the Barbican Centre. Chaired by the Planning Inspectorate, this determined how the examination would be carried out, including consideration of more detailed hearings on site-specific matters, as well as project-wide issues. While the inspectors gave a commitment to consider the alternatives to the tunnel, in the event they were not reviewed as part of the examination. Government legislation and the NPSWW required that all efforts be made to reduce carbon emissions in new projects, but the examiners did not manage to study this issue. Once the Inspectorate concluded its examination of the application, a recommendation on whether or not to issue a development consent order would be submitted to ministers to make the final decision.

=== Planning acceptance ===
On 12 September 2014, the UK Government approved the plans, overriding some of the findings of the Planning Inspectorate. The decision gave rise to at least three judicial reviews.

== Funding and delivery ==
The budget for the scheme steadily increased since it was first estimated. For example, the budget in 2004 was estimated at £1.7bn, which included the East Ham to Stratford part and sewage treatment works upgrade costs. In the words of the Consumer Council for Water in 2011:

The estimated cost of the project has escalated, from £1.7bn in 2004 (including Stratford to East Ham part and sewage treatment civil engineering construction movements (STW) costs) to £2.2bn in 2007 (also including Lee Tunnel and STW costs) to £3.6bn now for the shorter Thames Tunnel as far as Abbey Mills, plus some £1bn for the Lee Tunnel and upgrade of works at Beckton. The total costs of all the Tideway schemes have therefore increased from £1.7bn six years ago to £4.6bn today (all costs at relevant year prices). There is no guarantee that the current estimate will not be subject to further escalation.

Less than a year later, in November 2011, a further £500 million was added to the estimate.

Following detailed analysis it was decided that the best means to deliver the project would be through a regulated infrastructure provider (IP) as this would maximise value for money. The IP, originally to be formed through a competitive process starting in the spring of 2013, would hold its own licence from the industry regulator, Ofwat, and would build, manage and maintain the tunnel.

In January 2013, it was announced the IP was to be delayed because Thames Water as main funder sought state financial assurances. This was a polemic. Opponents argued the government should not bear any such risks; Thames Water have noted the government faced EU fines if the work was not done. In a letter to the Financial Times in November 2012, Sir Ian Byatt (former Director General of Ofwat) and politician Simon Hughes MP stated:

If Thames is unwilling to make a rights issue, the owners, Macquarie, should be expected to return funds to the utility. If they do not, Thames should go into special administration (allowing for continued service to customers) and another company or financier allowed to take over its activities.

However, procurement for main contractors (who would eventually be contracted to the IP) for up to three packages of work valued at around £500m each started in the summer of 2013. On 29 July, Thames Water announced that a contract notice for work on the tunnel had been published in the Official Journal of the European Union (OJEU). Following prequalification questionnaires, Thames Water invited shortlisted contractors to tender between November 2013 and April 2014.

The successful contractors for the three main tunnelling contracts were announced in February 2015:

- West: Joint venture of BAM Nuttall, Morgan Sindall and Balfour Beatty Group
- Central: Joint venture of Ferrovial Agroman UK and Laing O'Rourke Construction
- East: Joint venture of Costain, Vinci Construction Grands Projets and Bachy Soletanche

In August 2015, the independent investors to finance and deliver the scheme were confirmed. Bazalgette Tunnel Limited, a new special-purpose company appointed to take the project forward, received its licence from Ofwat as a new regulated utilities business, separate from Thames Water. The special-purpose company is backed by pension funds and other long-term investors represented by Allianz, Amber Infrastructure Group, Dalmore Capital and DIF.

The funding scheme used was later named the Regulated Asset Base (RAB) model. If the cost overruns by more than 30%, the government would have to provide additional equity finance.

=== Timeline ===
- 2014: Planning decisions and approval
- 2015: Main works and financing contracts awarded
- 2016: Primary work completed; Main works preliminary construction begins
- 2018: Tunnelling begins
- 2019: Secondary lining begins
- 2022: Tunnelling ends
- 2024: All works completed
- 2025: Became fully operational

In August 2020, during the COVID-19 pandemic, a project lockdown and revised working practices meant the project was delayed by nine months and had incurred additional costs of £233m (taking the estimated project cost to £4.133bn). Completion was targeted for the first half of 2025.

Construction of the 25 km (16 mi) long tunnel was completed in March 2024 at a total cost of about £5bn. For test purposes, the first sewage was expected to flow into the tunnel during the summer of 2024 and, once testing was completed, it would be handed over to Thames Water, and become fully operational in 2025. In May 2024, a 1.5m thick reinforced concrete wall separating it from the Lee Tunnel 66m below ground was removed to allow commissioning and testing. This enabled flows captured by the Thames Tideway Tunnel to be transported to Beckton sewage treatment works for treatment. In October 2024, valves at four out of 21 sites along the Tunnel were brought into operation. In February 2025, the last of the 21 connections were completed; the project was to be tested in storm conditions over the ensuing months. The Thames Tideway Tunnel was officially opened by King Charles III on 7 May 2025. Completion of surface-level works, including new public spaces, continued into 2026. The planned July 2026 opening of a section of the Thames Path in King Edward Memorial Park in Tower Hamlets was delayed following a theft of tools and parts.

== Controversy ==
Since the initial proposal, questions focussed on the cost, the location of construction sites, duration, disruption, and whether a tunnel was the correct solution for London and for Thames Water customers.

=== Cost and reward to the business owners ===
The £4.3bn cost of the Thames Tideway Tunnel project is to be funded by Thames Water customers. This has angered customers who dispute an accounting practice confirmed by the industry regulator. Ofwat confirmed the extent of leveraging on the balance sheet, reducing tax due and allowing annual payouts of dividends – money which some feel should have cut the cost of the scheme. Thames Water maintains that it has done nothing unusual by making tax-deductible investments in the natural and proper domain of its business which reduces tax; this is conventional practice. It explains that the money raised was used for essential maintenance and upgrade works. The earliest year in which customers' bills would be affected was 2014–15, with charges rising gradually after that. The project was estimated to add up to £70 to £80 (excluding inflation) to average annual wastewater bills from around 2019. However, these figures were subsequently revised downwards. In August 2015, the impact was expected to be around £20 to £25 per year by the mid-2020s.

=== Disruption ===
Some people who live alongside proposed sites were concerned about the noise, disruption and potential loss of public space resulting from construction. To address this Thames Water put together a Code of Construction Practice to outline site-specific and project-wide requirements and measures to minimise the impacts of the construction and ensure best practice standards and requirements across all sites and contracts. The code also covered transport (both road and river), noise and vibration mitigation, air quality and water resources, land quality, waste management and resource use, ecology and conservation and historic environment. In the report that concluded its inspection of these documents, the Planning Inspectorate found that Thames Water had "underestimated of impacts on those that have been identified as having a significant effect and underestimated the number of receptors experiencing a significant effect" (12.97) and concluded "We do not consider that [Thames Water's] proposals meet the first aim of the NPS test to avoid significant adverse impacts on health and quality of life from noise" (12.357).

=== The need for a tunnel ===
Some people prefer an option that Thames Water's studies show would be up to three times more expensive. This is a sustainable urban drainage system (SUDS) under Central London streets and open spaces with small pumping stations in places of low gradient. They outline the added benefits of building green infrastructure, particularly uncovering streams and rivers in some places in inner London Boroughs where they were culverted in the past. Their most progressive arguments are for replacing paved, impermeable surfaces in London with permeable options and implementing green roofs, swales and water butts to promote the infiltration of rain-water, preventing it from reaching the combined sewer system, thus reducing peak flows and limiting the number of CSO overflows. Some of these advocates denounce Thames Water's 2011 five theoretical case studies of the solution (finding the threefold cost), citing householders' assistance such as emptying water butts, gardening more, and not using land for parking, and say this could be the cheapest option. Green infrastructure would have further benefits for London in addition to addressing the rainwater overflow problem, such as:

1. Increased resilience to drought and floods
2. Reduction in urban air pollution
3. Climate change mitigation – contrasted to the tunnel's significant carbon footprint
4. Enjoyment, aesthetics and health benefits of green spaces and nature
5. Reduced urban heat island effects with an associated reduction in cooling load and carbon emissions
6. Improved urban biodiversity
7. Earlier avoidance of EU fines for not meeting water standards than under the scheme

=== Continued overflows forecast ===
The number of CSO discharges is set to fall from an average of 60 a year to less than five. The Environment Agency is satisfied that the Tideway water quality after such discharges will be acceptable. When both the tunnels are operational, overflows will occur only after sustained periods of intense rainfall and after the tunnels have captured the most damaging 'first flush' from the foul sewers. The remaining total overflow will average 2.6 million cubic metres per year, on 2011 estimates.
