= Beckton Sewage Treatment Works =

Sewage treatment plant in Newham, East London

Coordinates: 51.52067°N 0.08663°E

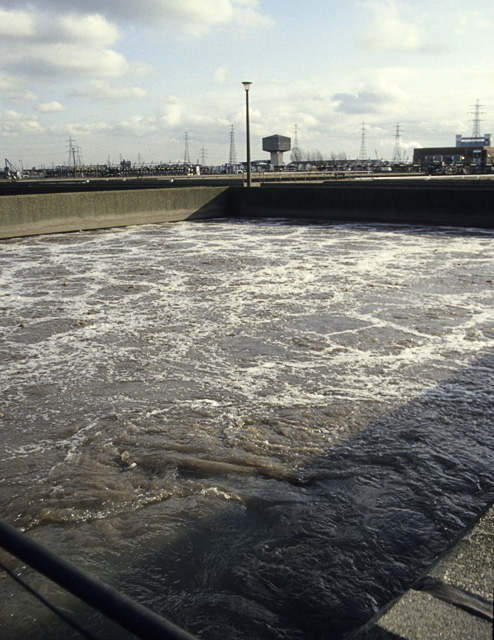
An activated sludge tank at Beckton Sewage Treatment Works

Beckton Sewage Treatment Works, formerly known as Barking Sewage Works, is a large sewage treatment plant in Beckton in the east London Borough of Newham, operated by Thames Water.

Since construction first began in 1864, the plant has been extended numerous times and now covers over 100 hectares (250 acres) – what is claimed to be the largest sewage treatment works in Europe, although this is disputed with Seine Aval treatment plant near Paris. It treats wastewater arriving from the Northern Outfall Sewer and the Lee Tunnel, serving a large portion of London north of the River Thames.

The treated effluent from the plant is discharged into the Thames at the southeast corner of the site, adjacent to Barking Creek.

== History ==
Sewage-treatment works were first established at Beckton in 1864 as part of Joseph Bazalgette's scheme to remove sewage (and hence reduce disease) from London by creating two large sewers from the capital, one on each side of the Thames and known as the Southern and Northern Outfall Sewers. In addition to the sewage from the Northern Outfall sewer, the Becton treatment works also received sewage from a pumping station at North Woolwich.

As originally conceived in 1864, the works comprised reservoirs covering 3.8 hectares designed to retain six hours' flow of sewage. No sewage treatment was provided, and the sewage was discharged on the ebb tide. The presence of raw sewage contributed to the high death toll in the 1878 Princess Alice disaster, when over 600 died in Britain's worst inshore shipping tragedy. Following the disaster, a Royal Commission was appointed in 1882 to examine metropolitan sewage disposal. It recommended that a precipitation process should be deployed to separate solids from liquids, and that the solids should be burned, applied to land, or dumped at sea. A precipitation works using lime and iron sulphate was installed at Beckton in 1887–89. Sludge was disposed of in the Barrow Deep and later in the Black Deep in the outer Thames estuary. In the year 1912–3, 1,704,000 tons of sludge was sent to sea; by 1919–20, 1.223 million tons of sludge had been sent to sea, entailing 1,223 sludge-vessel voyages.

In the year 1912–13, the total volume of sewage received at Beckton was 268 million cubic metres (9.5×10^{9} cu ft). In the year 1919–20, the volume was 271 million cubic metres (9.6×10^{9} cu ft). The costs of treating the sewage at Beckton was £73,698 or £1 4s 11d per million gallons (£1.246 per 4546.1 m^{3}) in 1912–13; by 1919–20, the cost had increased to £79,074 or £1 6s 6d. (£1.325) per million gallons.

=== Advanced treatment ===
Between 1932 and 1935, an activated sludge plant was installed which relied on surface aeration of the sewage by mechanical paddles. In 1959 a £7.5 million extension (equivalent to £152,000,000 in 2025) was completed. This comprised detritus removal, a screen house, primary sedimentation tanks, a diffused-air activated sludge plant, and sludge digestion. The works were extended in 1967 to treat 1.14 million cubic metres per day of sewage, although they were capable of accepting a flow of 2.6 million cubic metres per day. These works cost £21 million (equivalent to £335,000,000 in 2025).

The Beckton plant comprised:

Treatment tanks at Beckton sewage treatment works, 1967
Service	No.	Type
Primary sedimentation	32	Rectangular
Aeration tanks	22	Rectangular
Final sedimentation tanks	92	Circular
Sludge digestion tanks	36	Circular

Sewage sludge was disposed of by dumping at sea in the outer Thames estuary until this practice was banned in 1998. In that year, a sludge-incineration plant was commissioned, which provides 11.4 MW of power for use at the treatment works.

=== New processes ===
In 2014, an upgrade to the Beckton works included a new activated-sludge process stream designed to treat 30 percent of the 27 m^{3}/s maximum flow to the works; three new odour-control plants installed across the existing works to address planning conditions imposed on the upgrade project; replacement of 48 existing final settlement tank scrapers; and upgrades to a further 24 final settlement tanks.

=== Thames Tideway Scheme ===
Wastewater collected by the Thames Tideway Scheme will be transferred to Beckton for treatment, via the Lee Tunnel from Abbey Mills Pumping Station.

In 2020, a new three-year, £123 million upgrade project was started to increase capacity at Beckton to allow it to process the increased flow of sewage. This included building a completely new inlet works, and extending aeration lanes and settlement tanks.

== Desalination plant ==
The Beckton site was proposed in 2005 as the location for a desalination plant, but the proposal was rejected by Mayor of London Ken Livingstone as environmentally unacceptable. The scheme was resurrected by his successor, Boris Johnson, as part of a deal with Thames Water to reduce delays in fixing roadworks throughout London. Construction commenced in 2008, and the desalination plant was completed in June 2010.

The desalination plant collects brackish water from the river Thames while the tide is flowing out, treating it through a four-stage reverse-osmosis process, re-adding minerals, and sending it on to the freshwater distribution system. The plant was designed to process approximately 150 million litres of water per day, enough to supply 400,000 houses in North London, but has been rarely used and can only supply two-thirds of its planned capability.

== See also ==
- London sewer system
- Crossness Sewage Treatment Works
