= Christopher Bazalgette =

English amateur cricketer and writer

Christopher David Evelyn Bazalgette (24 November 1938 – 5 January 2023) was an English amateur cricketer and writer who was the founder of European Cricketer Cup.

== Early life and education ==
Bazalgette was born in Birmingham and was a great-grandson of Victorian engineer Sir Joseph Bazalgette and a relative of television executive Sir Peter Bazalgette. He attended Allhallows School and served for four years in the Royal Horse Guards.

== Career ==
In 1972, Bazalgette joined The Cricketer magazine, where he worked for 35 years as an advertisement manager.

Bazalgette was deeply involved in cricket promotion. He managed West Indies batsman Gordon Greenidge for three years, organized a single-wicket competition at The Oval in 1979, and assisted in the management of Ian Botham during the 1980s. In 2006, he coached actor Sacha Baron Cohen's comedic character Borat Sagdiyev in a televised cricket segment filmed at Hambledon.

As a cricketer, Bazalgette was a slow-medium bowler. He is the leading wicket-taker for the Hampshire Hogs, with 1,405 wickets. Famously holding his trousers up with a club tie, he claimed to have taken over 2,500 wickets in his entire amateur career. His method involved flighting the ball above the batsman's eyeline to induce errors.

Later in life, after losing his position at The Cricketer, he faced financial hardship. The cricket community supported him through a fundraising dinner, considered the first "benefit" for an amateur cricketer since W. G. Grace. He authored several books, including Think Cricket.

== Personal life ==
Bazalgette was married to June Bitten from 1965 until her death in 2018, and they had one daughter. Bazalgette died of heart and kidney failure at the age of 84.
