= Simon Bazalgette =

British business leader, advisor and investor (born 1962)

Simon Bazalgette (born 28 March 1962) is a business leader, advisor and investor in the sports, leisure, media and entertainment industries.

== Biography ==
Bazalgette was born on 28 March 1962, in Aylesbury. He attended Thames Valley Grammar School in Twickenham and Richmond upon Thames College before reading mathematics at Warwick University, where he graduated in 1983. He is a supporter of Brentford FC.

Prior to that Bazalgette worked at KPMG for 10 years as both a chartered accountant and management consultant specialising in media and entertainment businesses.

Between 2004 and 2008, Bazalgette ran Racing UK, the media rights management company and satellite TV channel, as its founding executive chairman. From 1993 and 2003, he was one of the founding directors of digital broadcast network, Music Choice Europe, becoming chief executive in 1999. Under his leadership, Music Choice Europe reached more than 14 million subscribers across Europe and floated on the London Stock Exchange in 2000.

Bazalgette is the great-great-grandson of Joseph Bazalgette who, as the former chief engineer of London, led the construction of several bridges and embankments we use today along the River Thames, and created a sewer network for central London which was instrumental in relieving the city from cholera epidemics.

Until the end of 2019, Bazalgette was chief executive of The Jockey Club, which runs 15 UK racecourses including Cheltenham, Aintree, Epsom and Newmarket, and other assets such as The National Stud. Governed by Royal Charter, with a turnover in excess of £200 million, The Jockey Club is the largest commercial group in British horse racing. Bazalgette was also senior independent director of the London 2017 World Championships in Athletics.

He is also independent non-executive director of the English Football League, and a member of the Sports Board of major charity, NSPCC.

In 2020, Bazalgette founded Global Venue Services (GVS), an advisory, investment and business services firm operating in the sports, leisure, media and entertainment sectors.
