= Lee Tunnel =

Sewer tunnel in London

- Interactive map of Lee Tunnel

Overview
- Official name: Lee Tunnel
- Coordinates: 51.5307°N 0.000835°W
- Status: Open
- Start: Abbey Mills Pumping Station
- End: Beckton Sewage Treatment Works

Operation
- Work began: 2010
- Constructed: MVB JV consortium
- Opened: 28 January 2016
- Owner: Thames Water
- Operator: Thames Water

Technical
- Length: 6.9 km (4.3 mi)
- Max elevation: −75 m (−246 ft) at Abbey Mills
- Min elevation: −80 m (−260 ft) at Beckton
- Width: 7.2 m (24 ft)

The Lee Tunnel, also known as the Stratford to East Ham deep tunnel, is an overflow sewer in East London for storage and conveyance of foul sewage mixed with rainwater. It was built as part of the Thames Tideway Scheme and runs from Abbey Mills Pumping Station down to pumps and storage tanks at Jenkins Lane, Beckton Sewage Treatment Works. It is wholly under the London Borough of Newham.

This 6.9-kilometre (4.3 mi) tunnel, of 7.2 m (24 ft) diameter, laid at between 75 m (246 ft) deep at start to 80 m (260 ft) at finish, captures c. 16,000,000 m^{3} (1.6×10^{10} L), or 16 million tonnes, of sewage annually from the single largest polluting CSO in London – the amount varies with rainfall. This sewage overflow had flowed untreated into the River Lea, after which it diluted gradually in the Thames Tideway (the narrowest parts of the Thames Estuary). It can take 30 days for effluent to reach the sea from the Tideway.

From its terminus, pumps send the effluent into the adjacent Beckton Sewage Treatment Works – the largest such works in Europe. From that works the resultant water (treated sewage), with solids removed and the most harmful chemicals treated, empties into the (Thames's) Tideway, its upper estuary. Lying at −75 metres (−246 ft) AOD means a second source of London's old-style combined sewers' effluent can be caught, that from the Thames Tideway Tunnel, which opened in 2025.

== Construction ==
Thames Water awarded the construction contract to the MVB JV consortium, comprising Morgan Sindall, VINCI Construction Grands Projets, and Bachy Soletanche, in January 2010. The contract price, combined with Thames Water's own improvements was estimated at £635 million.

Construction began with sinking of vertical shafts in 2010. In February 2012, the TBM, built by Herrenknecht and named Busy Lizzie, started work at the east end. In 2013, a UK record concrete slipform pour was achieved: 29 days of continual pouring. The tunnel is the deepest bored in London. The TBM reached the west end in January 2014. The tunnel was completed, and opened by Mayor of London Boris Johnson, in January 2016.
