= Peter Bazalgette =

British television executive (born 1953)

Sir Peter Bazalgette
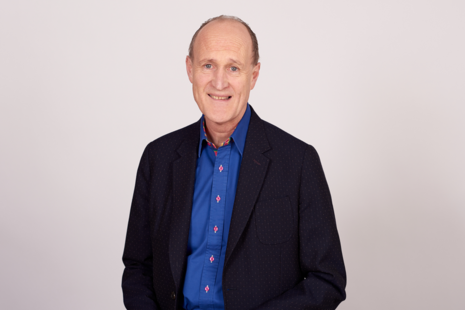
- Bazalgette in 2022
- Born: Peter Lytton Bazalgette; 22 May 1953 (age 73); Croydon, Surrey, England
- Education: Dulwich College; Fitzwilliam College, Cambridge
- Occupations: TV producer and executive
- Employer: formerly Endemol
- Known for: Big Brother; Ready Steady Cook; Changing Rooms
- Spouses: Hilary née Newiss, now Lady Bazalgette
- Children: 2
- Parent(s): Paul Bazalgette; Diana née Coffin
- Relatives: Sir Joseph Bazalgette (great-great-grandfather); Edward Bazalgette (third cousin)
- Bazalgette's voice recorded in July 2013

Bazalgette arms

Sir Peter Lytton Bazalgette (/ˈbæzəldʒɛt/; born 22 May 1953) is a British television executive and producer, also active in the fields of the arts and broader creative industries.

== Personal life ==
A great-great-grandson of Victorian civil engineer Sir Joseph Bazalgette, a third cousin is Edward Bazalgette, who directed and produced the 2003 documentary The Sewer King, which charted Sir Joseph Bazalgette's design and engineering of the London sewers. Peter Bazalgette presented a later television show for Five, called The Great Stink, and chaired the Crossness Engines Trust raising £4.5 million to restore the Victorian pumping station built by his ancestor.

Bazalgette was born on 22 May 1953 near Croydon in northeast Surrey. His parents, Paul Bazalgette and Diana née Coffin, did not have a television until he was 12 years old. He attended Dulwich College and then studied Law at Fitzwilliam College, Cambridge, graduating with a third-class degree and also serving as President of the Cambridge Union Society.

Married since 1985 to Hilary Newiss, an intellectual property rights lawyer, with two children, Sir Peter and Lady Bazalgette live in Notting Hill, London.

== Career ==
Bazalgette joined the BBC News graduate news training scheme, and was subsequently picked by Dame Esther Rantzen as a researcher on That's Life! from 1978. While a reporter at the BBC for Man Alive, he joined Eric Parsloe's video production company Epic. The BBC put him in charge of producing the programme Food and Drink, where he claims to have created the celebrity chef. He continued producing by forming his own production company Bazal, which created hits for British TV including Ready Steady Cook, Changing Rooms and Ground Force. In 1990, Bazal was acquired by Broadcast Communications, which itself was absorbed by Endemol.

In January 2005, Bazalgette became Chairman of Endemol UK and Creative Director of Endemol Group worldwide. He was responsible for television shows including Big Brother and Deal or No Deal which were hits around the world, and led Endemol's digital entertainment strategy. Although Big Brother was conceived from an existing series in the Netherlands, Bazalgette is credited with popularising the format around the world due to the adaptations he built into the UK version. During Bazalgette's time on the global board, Endemol grew strongly and in 2005 it was launched on the Dutch stock exchange. Over the following eighteen months, it trebled in value and was sold in 2007 for €3.2 billion. In September 2007 it was announced that Bazalgette was standing down as Chairman and would assume the role of advisor.

Bazalgette has long championed the value of the BBC for its trusted news and critical investment in original programming and creative talent. Along with others he has speculated how long the current funding model of the BBC will last, and whether in the future the licence fee might be reduced to pay specifically for core news and information content.

Bazalgette has been elected a Fellow of BAFTA and the Royal Television Society, and was President of the Royal Television Society 2010–17. He was as a non-executive director of the Department for Culture, Media and Sport. In September 2012 he was appointed Chairman of Arts Council England, and began his 4-year term on 31 January 2013.

The Independent argued that he may be "the most influential man in British television" as a result of his impact on the development of reality television and lifestyle TV programmes. The Daily Mail once named him as one of the "Ten Worst Britons" for Endemol's Channel 4 show Big Brother and the London Evening Standard television critic Victor Lewis-Smith said that Bazalgette had "done more to debase television over the past decade than anyone else."

In September 2012, it was announced that he would succeed Dame Elizabeth Forgan to chair the Arts Council England. This was during a time of cuts to public arts spending, partly remedied with a new system of tax credits. In September 2016 it was announced that Sir Nicholas Serota would replace him as Chairman of the Arts Council England.

In January 2015, prime minister David Cameron announced the creation of the United Kingdom Holocaust Memorial Foundation, and said Bazalgette would serve as its chairman. He was replaced in April 2018. In 2024, 10 years after Cameron promised that Britain would create a fitting memorial to remember all those who died in the Holocaust, the project to create a UK memorial and learning centre was mired in controversy, with planning permission for the memorial to be built in Victoria Tower Gardens having been quashed in the high court in April 2022 and objections to the Holocaust Memorial Bill, legislation intended to repeal the 1900 Act that set aside the Gardens for public use, being heard from parliamentarians including MPs Sir Peter Bottomley and Nickie Aiken, Lord Blencathra and Lord Carlile of Berriew experts and Holocaust survivors at a select committee meeting in the Commons.

In February 2016, Bazalgette was named as the Chairman of ITV, effective from 12 May 2016. In March 2022 ITV announced that Peter Bazalgette would step down as Chairman of ITV, effective from 29 September 2022.

== Other interests ==
Bazalgette has co-written four books including The Food Revolution, You Don't Have to Diet, and a biography of Egon Ronay. He is author of a study of the international TV formats business, Billion Dollar Game and, more recently, The Empathy Instinct. He is a speaker at global media events and lectures on media convergence and creativity. He has written widely on privacy and the internet, young people and voting, arts and philanthropy, public service broadcasting and student volunteering. He is very active of the field of public policy as it relates to media and the creative industries.

He was a consultant to two of Sony’s divisions in the UK, and was non-executive director of Base79. In early 2017, he was tasked with leading the new independent review of the creative industries for BEIS and DCMS. He is a former board member of Channel 4 and former Deputy Chairman of the National Film and Television School, where he helped raise £8 million for a new teaching building. He was Chairman of English National Opera and was a Trustee of Debate Mate.

== Appointments ==
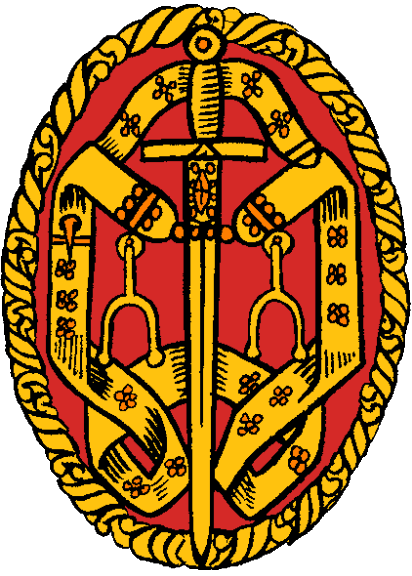
Insignia of a Knight Bachelor

Since 2021, Bazalgette has served as co-Chair of the Creative Industries Council, pro-Chancellor and Chairman of Council at the Royal College of Art, a non-executive board member at the Department for Education and Chairman of the Baillie Gifford non-fiction book prize. He was elected President of the Royal Television Society and Deputy Chairman of the National Film School. He was knighted in the New Year Honours for 2012 for services to broadcasting. He has been a benefactor to the Arts and Chairman of English National Opera. He was Chairman of Arts Council England from 2012 until 2016 and Chairman of ITV from 2016 to 2022. He was a non-executive board member of UK Research and Innovation (UKRI) and also served on the advisory board of BBH. He sat on the board of the market researcher, YouGov, from 2003 to 2013. In January 2017, his latest book The Empathy Instinct was published.

== See also ==
- Bazalgette Mausoleum

Cultural offices
Preceded by Bob Phillis	President of the Royal Television Society; 2010–2016	Vacant
Preceded by Dame Elizabeth Forgan	Chair, Arts Council England; 2012–2016	Succeeded by Sir Nick Serota
