= Crossness Sewage Treatment Works =

Sewage treatment plant in Southeast London

Coordinates: 51.50540°N 0.14202°E

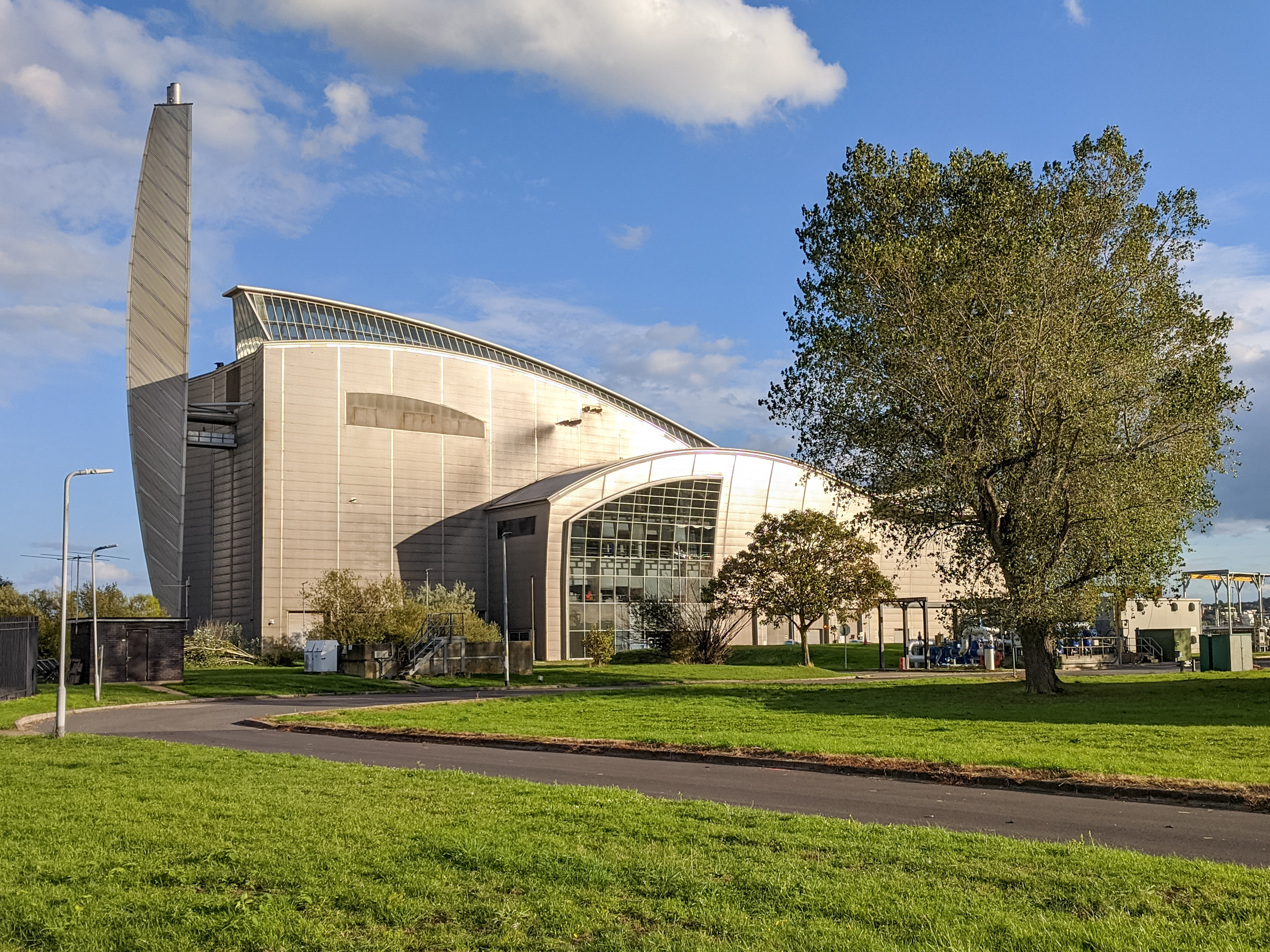
The sludge incinerator at Crossness, viewed from west

The Crossness Sewage Treatment Works is a sewage treatment plant located at Crossness in the London Borough of Bexley. It was opened in 1865 and is Europe's second largest sewage treatment works, after its counterpart Beckton Sewage Treatment Works located north of the river. Crossness treats the waste water from the Southern Outfall Sewer serving South and South East London, and is operated by Thames Water.

The treated effluent from the plant is discharged into the River Thames at the eastern end of the site.

== History ==
As originally conceived the works comprised reservoirs covering 2.6 hectares designed to retain six hours’ flow of sewage. No sewage treatment was provided and the sewage was discharged untreated into the River Thames on the ebb tide. Following the Princess Alice disaster in 1878 a Royal Commission was appointed in 1882 to examine Metropolitan Sewage Disposal. It recommended that a precipitation process should be deployed to separate solids from the liquid and that the solids should be burned, applied to land or dumped at sea. A precipitation works using lime and iron sulphate was installed at Crossness in 1888–91. Sludge was disposed of in the Barrow Deep and later in the Black Deep in the outer Thames estuary. In the year 1912/13 the Crossness works received and treated 49,534 million gallons (225.2 million m^{3}) of sewage, and disposed of 880,000 tons of sludge. The cost of operating the Crossness works was £44,269. In 1919/20 the corresponding figures were 41,209 million gallons (187.3 million m^{3}), of sewage, 767,000 tons of sludge sent to sea, entailing 767 sludge vessel voyages, and the costs were £52,282.

=== Advanced treatment ===
Work began in the early 1960s to install a modern treatment plant capable of treating 450,000 cubic metres per day of sewage. The cost of the works was £9 million at 1963 prices. The plant comprised storm tanks, detritus channels, primary sedimentation, mechanical aeration, final sedimentation and sludge digestion.

Treatment tanks at Crossness sewage treatment works, 1964
| Service | No. | Type |
|---|---|---|
| Storm tanks | | Rectangular |
| Primary sedimentation tanks | 16 | Rectangular |
| Aeration tanks | Mechanical aeration, 348 | Rectangular |
| Final sedimentation tanks | 32 | Circular |
| Primary sludge digestion tanks | 16 | Circular |
| Secondary sludge digestion tanks | 12 | Circular |

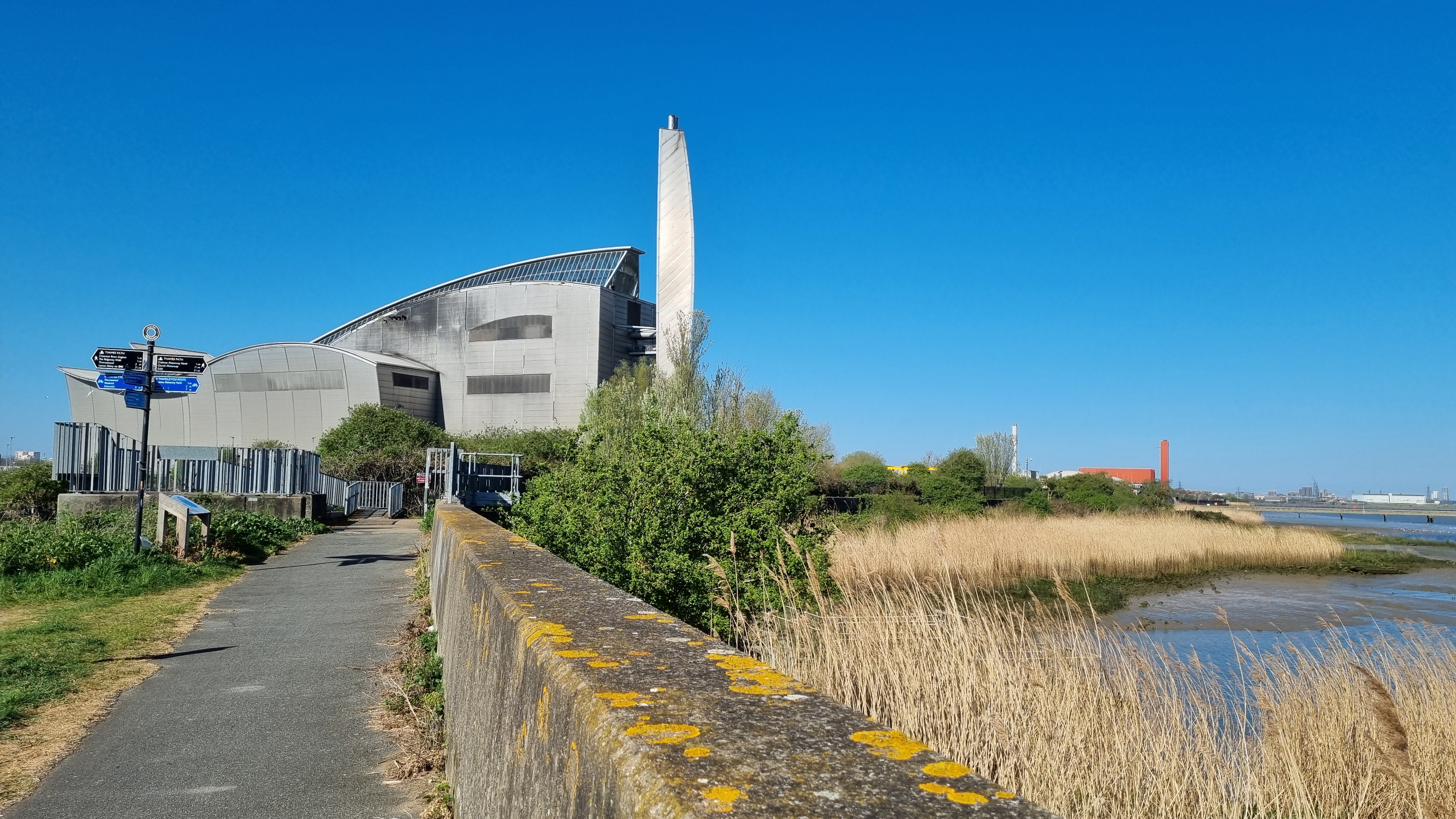
Crossness sewage incinerator, viewed from east (April 2025)

Following the 1964 upgrade the works at Crossness began to produce a nitrifying effluent whereupon sulphide disappeared from the tideway; an excess of nitrate provided a safeguard against sulphide formation in the river. The practice of dumping sewage sludge at sea was banned in 1998. In that year a sludge incineration plant was commissioned, and the plant was officially opened by the Duke of Edinburgh on 4 November 1998. The plant provides 6 MW of power for use at the treatment works.

=== New processes ===
In 2010–14 the Crossness works were upgraded at a cost of £220 million, increasing capacity by 44% to reduce storm sewage flowing into the Thames during heavy rainfall. The upgrade involved the installation of new renewable energy sources including a 2.3 MW wind turbine, a thermal hydrolysis plant, an advanced digestion plant, and an odour control treatment system. The project enabled the plant to treat 13 cubic metres of sewage per second and incorporated new inlet works, primary settlement tanks, secondary biological treatment implementing the activated sludge process and final settlement tanks. It also included the installation of associated sludge thickening and odour treatment facilities.

The hydrolysis plant burns combustible sludge flakes created after waste water treatment to 160 °C, producing 50 per cent more biogas than anaerobic digestion process. The project included the installation of eight new primary settlement tanks where sewage is collected to remove primary sludge passing through two 1.2 km-long culverts of 2 m diameter.

Sewage passes through a pair of new aeration lanes into twelve final settlement tanks of 40 m diameter. The activated sludge plant includes six aeration lanes of 69 m with total volume of 86,000 cubic metres and a treatment capacity of 564,000 cubic metres per day. It includes anoxic zone mixers, a fine bubble diffused aeration system and five centrifugal blowers giving an air flow of up to 21,000 cubic metres per hour. Additional sludge storage and thickening facilities store the additional sludge. The five raw sludge gravity belt thickeners have a capacity of 6,055 cubic metres per day each.

== Crossness Pumping Station ==
The original sewage pumping station on the site of the treatment plant, constructed between 1859 and 1865 and featuring spectacular Victorian architecture, has been restored and is now open as a museum.

== See also ==
- London sewer system
