= Abbey Mills Pumping Station =

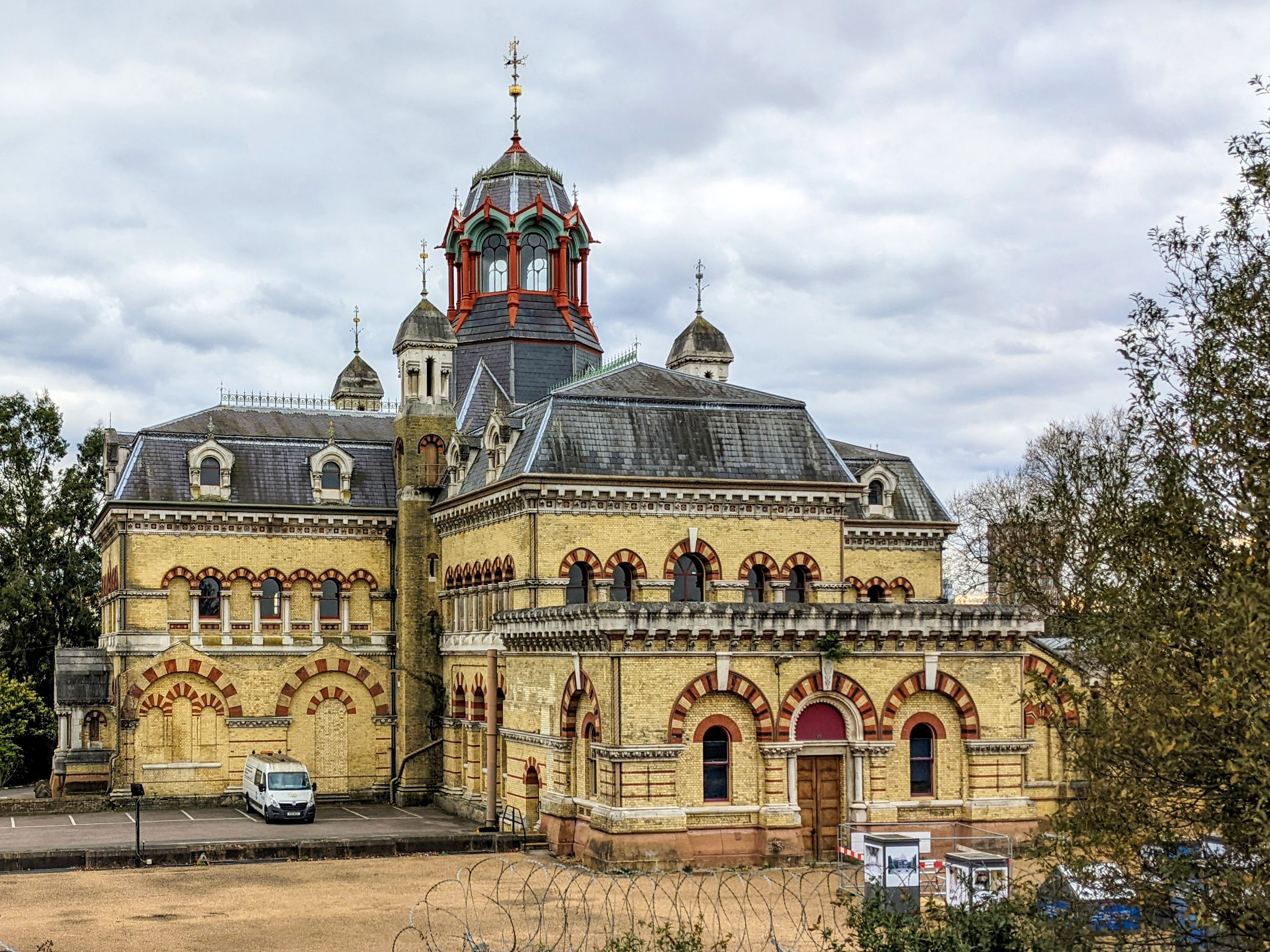
- The main building in 2022

- Location within London Borough of Newham

General information
- Status: in use
- Type: pumping station
- Architectural style: Italian Gothic
- Location: Abbey Lane, Mill Meads, London, England
- Coordinates: 51.5307°N 0.0008°W
- Construction started: 1865
- Completed: 1868

Design and construction
- Architect: Charles Driver
- Engineer: Joseph Bazalgette

Listed Building – Grade II*
- Designated: 6 November 1974
- Reference no.: 1190476

Abbey Mills Pumping Station is a sewage pumping station in Mill Meads, East London, operated by Thames Water. The pumping station lifts sewage on the London Main Drainage sewerage system into the Northern Outfall Sewer and the Lee Tunnel, which both run to Beckton Sewage Treatment Works.

The pumping station was designed by the architect Charles Driver for the Metropolitan Board of Works Chief Engineer Joseph Bazalgette and was built between 1865 and 1868, housing eight beam engines by Rothwell & Co. of Bolton, two on each arm of a cruciform plan. The architecture is an eclectic style related to Driver's railway station designs. Another of his designs, Crossness Pumping Station, is located south of the River Thames at Crossness, at the end of the Southern Outfall Sewer.

A modern sewage pumping station (Station F) was completed in 1997 about 200 metres (660 ft) south of the original station.

== History ==
The pumping station was built at the site of an earlier watermill owned by the former Stratford Langthorne Abbey, from which it gained the name "Abbey Mills". It was first recorded as Wiggemulne in 1312, i.e., "the mill of a man called Wicga", an Old English personal name, and subsequently became associated with the abbey. The abbey lay between the Channelsea River and Marsh Lane (Manor Road). It was dissolved in 1538. By 1840, the North Woolwich Railway ran through the site, and it began to be used to establish factories, and ultimately the sewage pumping stations.

=== Purpose ===
Abbey Mills Pumping Station was constructed to lift sewage between the two Low Level Sewers and the Northern Outfall Sewer, which was built in the 1860s to carry the increasing amount of sewage produced in London away from the centre of the city to the sewage treatment plant at Beckton.

Details of the pumps in the year 1912/13 were as follows:

Abbey Mills pumps (1912/13)
Pump	Sewage pumped, million gallons	Average lift, ft	Working costs
Beam engines	34,100	36.69	£19,801
Worthington engines	6,215	40.56	£6,234

The pumping capability was increased with the addition of gas engine driven pumps. Details of the operation of the pumps in the year 1919/20 were as follows:

Abbey Mills pumps (1919/20)
Pump	Sewage pumped, million gallons	Average lift, ft	Working costs
Beam engines	35,604.8	35.48	£46,767
Worthington engines	5,921.5	38.34	£16,117
Gas engines	3,209.4	39.66	£13,284

Two Moorish styled chimneys – unused since steam power had been replaced by electric motors in 1933 – were demolished in 1941, as it was feared that a strike from German bombs might topple them onto the pumping station.

The building still houses electric pumps – to be used to assist the new facility next door when required.

The main building is Grade II* listed and there are many Grade II-listed ancillary buildings, including the stumps of the demolished chimneys.

== Modern pumping station ==
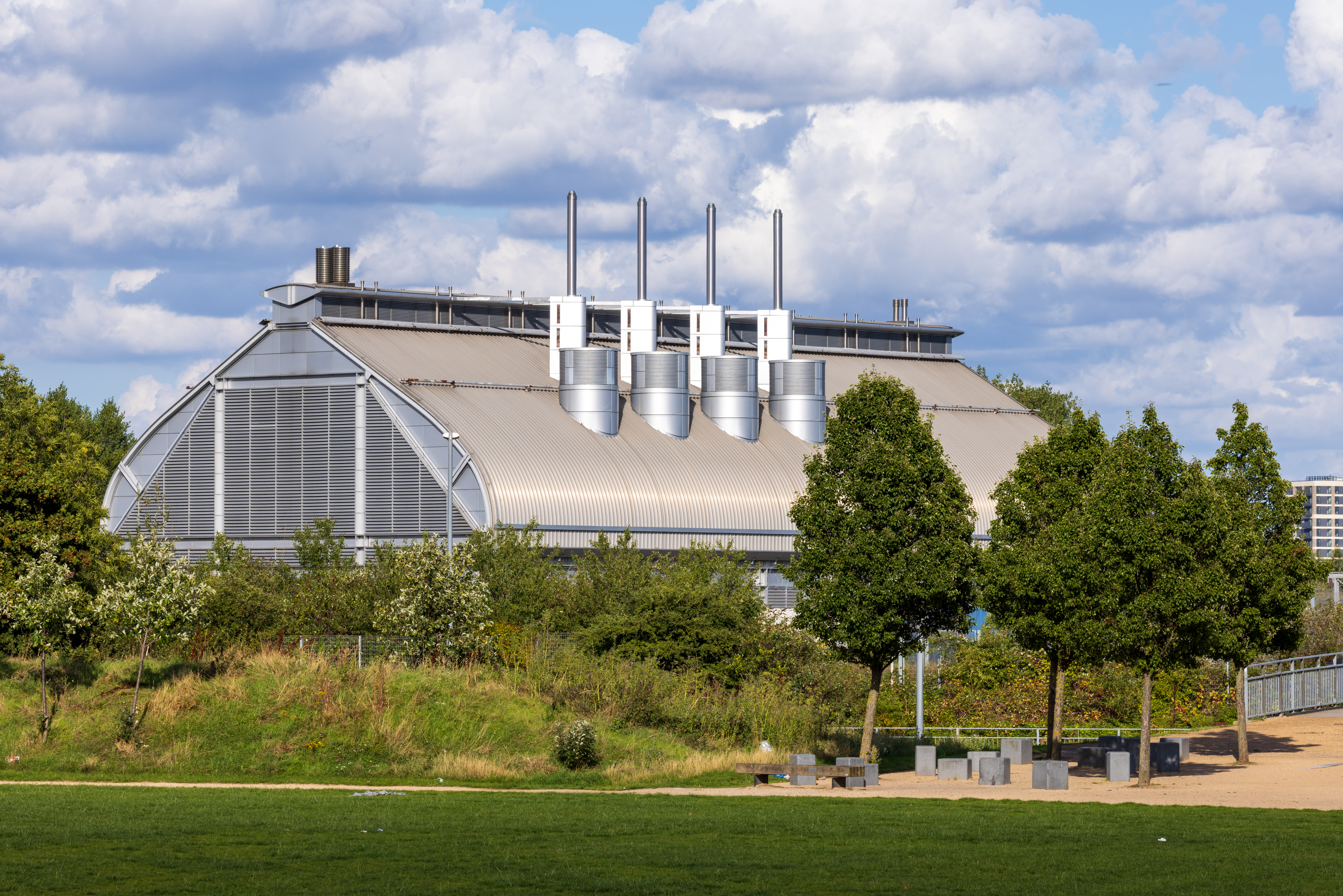
The modern Abbey Mills Pumping Station (Station F)

The modern pumping station (Station F) was designed by architects Allies and Morrison. The original building (Station A) has electrical pumps and these are used to assist the modern pumping station during high flows if required. It is one of the three principal London pumping stations dealing with foul water. Both pumping stations are able to discharge flows directly into the Lee Tunnel.

== Lee Tunnel ==
The Lee Tunnel is a sewage tunnel that runs from Abbey Mills to Beckton Sewage Treatment Works and is designed to handle the 16 million tons of overflow sewage that was previously discharged into the River Lea each year at Abbey Mills, as well as the additional wastewater brought to Abbey Mills by the Thames Tideway tunnel. Construction of the Lee Tunnel began in 2012 and it was opened for service in early 2016.

== Thames Tideway Scheme ==
Abbey Mills is the endpoint of the main Thames Tideway tunnel, where sewage will be transferred into the Lee Tunnel and onwards to Beckton for treatment. Both the Lee Tunnel and the main Thames Tideway tunnel also serve as storage reservoirs to store wastewater during heavy rainfall.

== Gallery ==
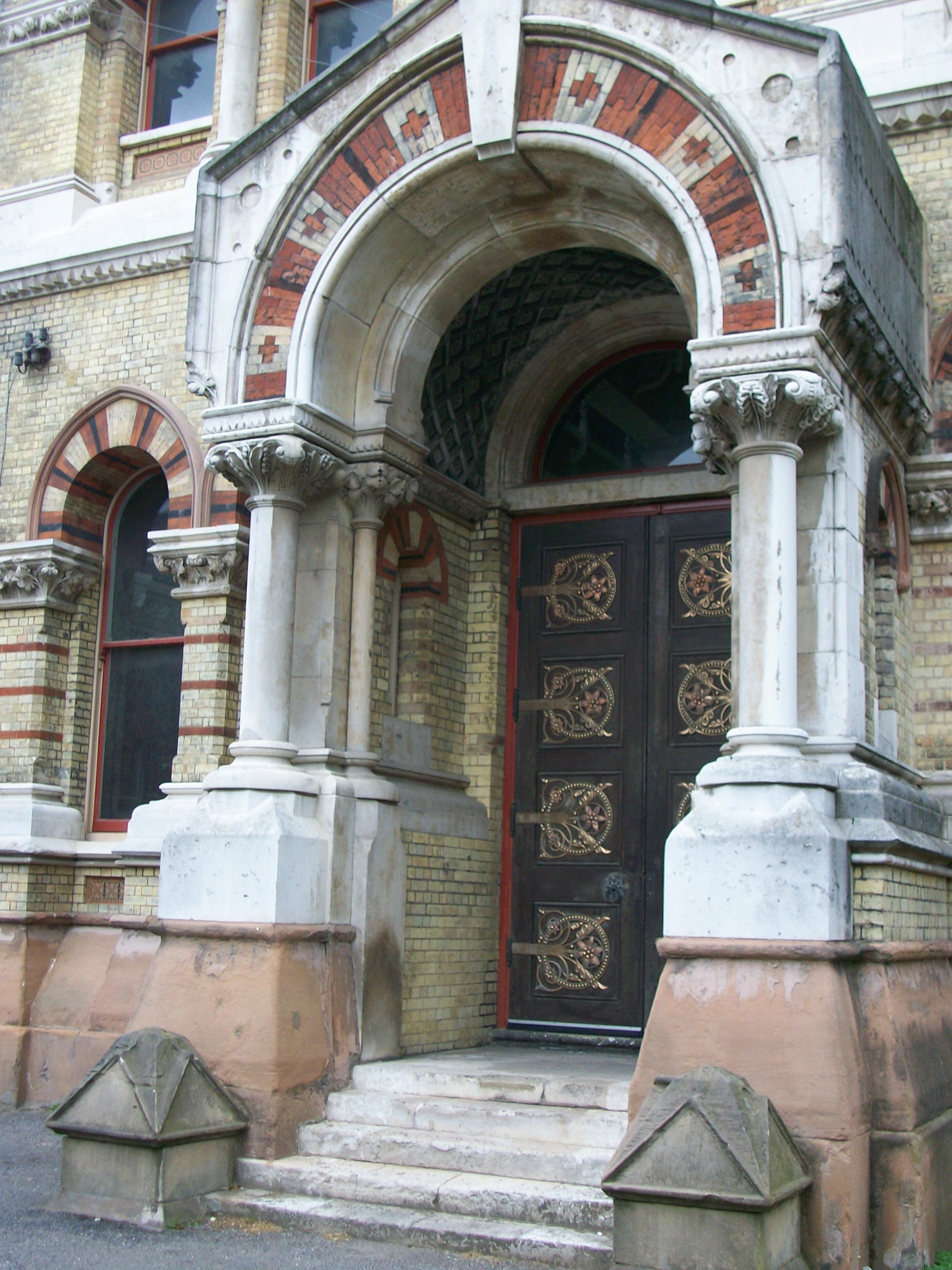
Door at Abbey Mills Pumping Station

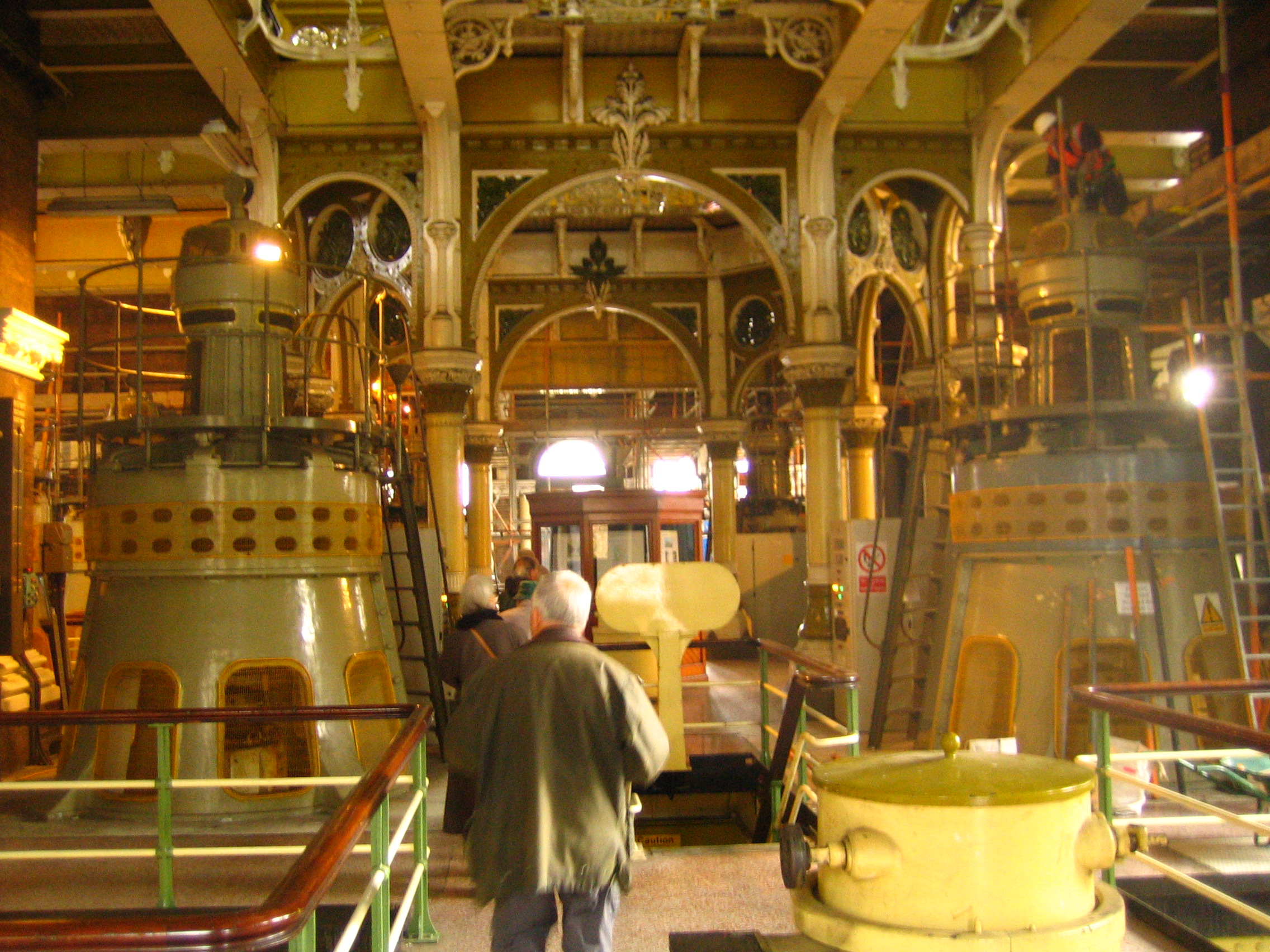
Interior

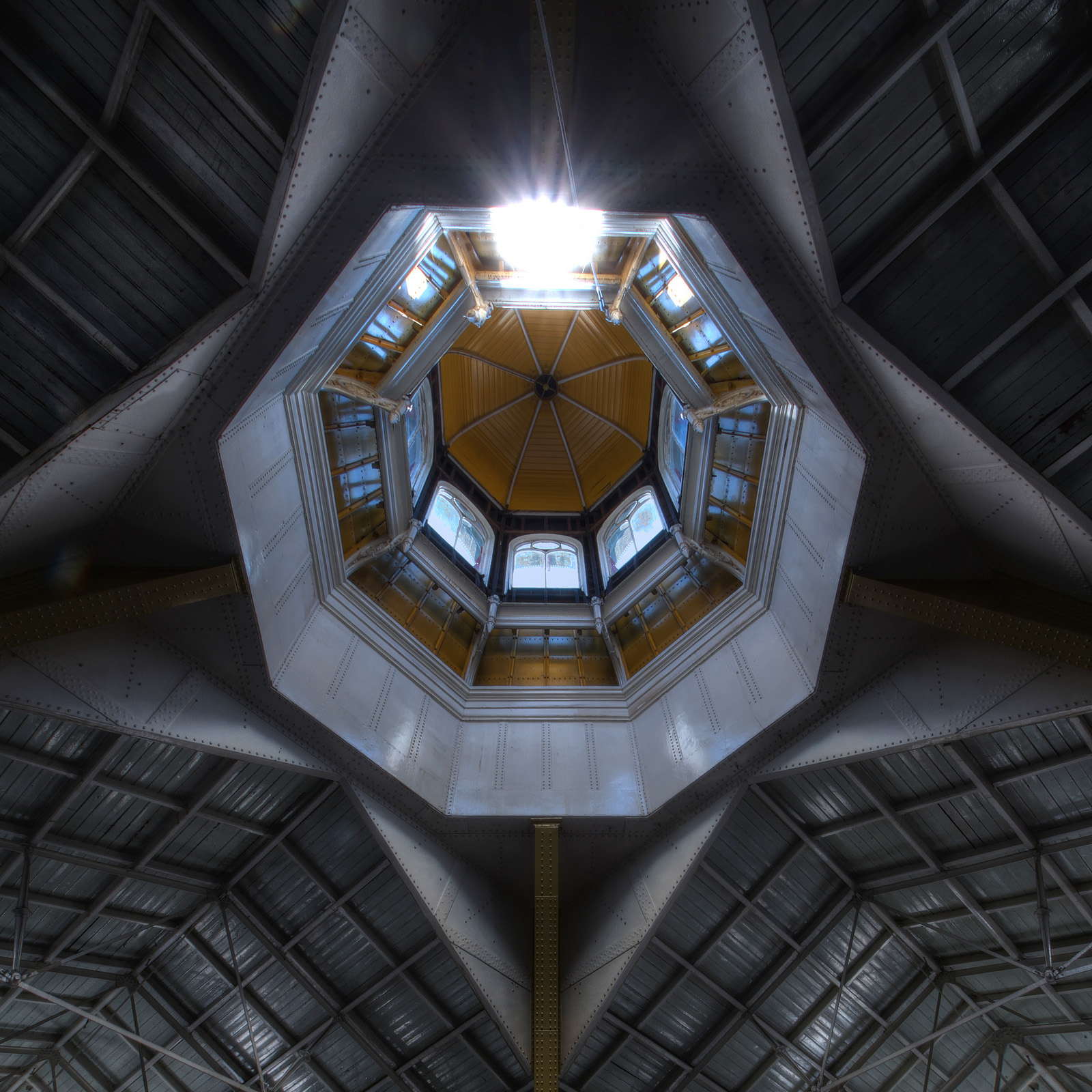
Lantern in Station A

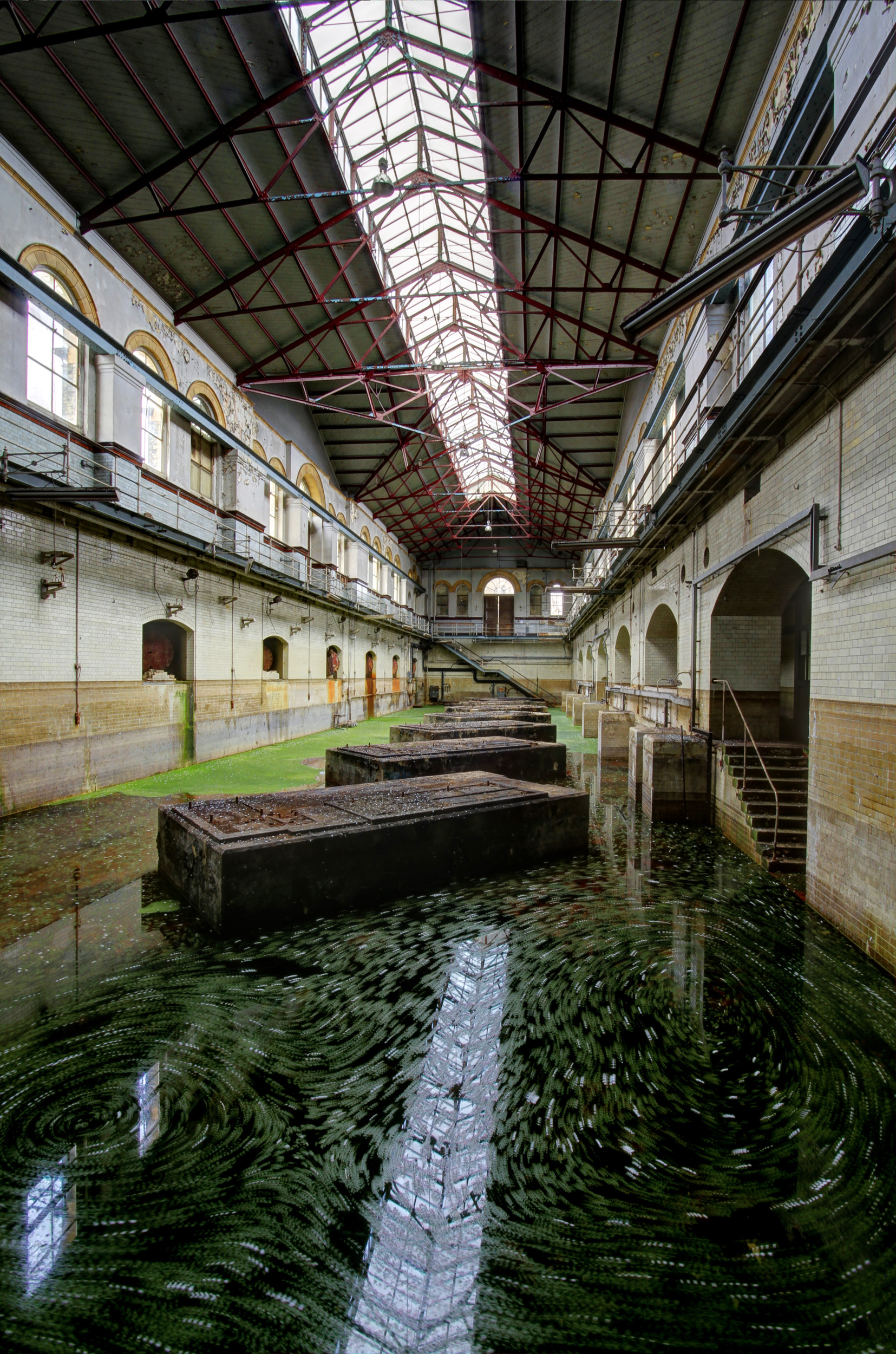
Station C
