= Iron sulfate =

Iron sulfate may refer to:

- Ferrous sulfate, Iron(II) sulfate, FeSO_{4}
- Ferric sulfate, Iron(III) sulfate, Fe_{2}(SO_{4})_{3}
