= Joseph Bazalgette =

British civil engineer (1819–1891)

Sir Joseph Bazalgette CB
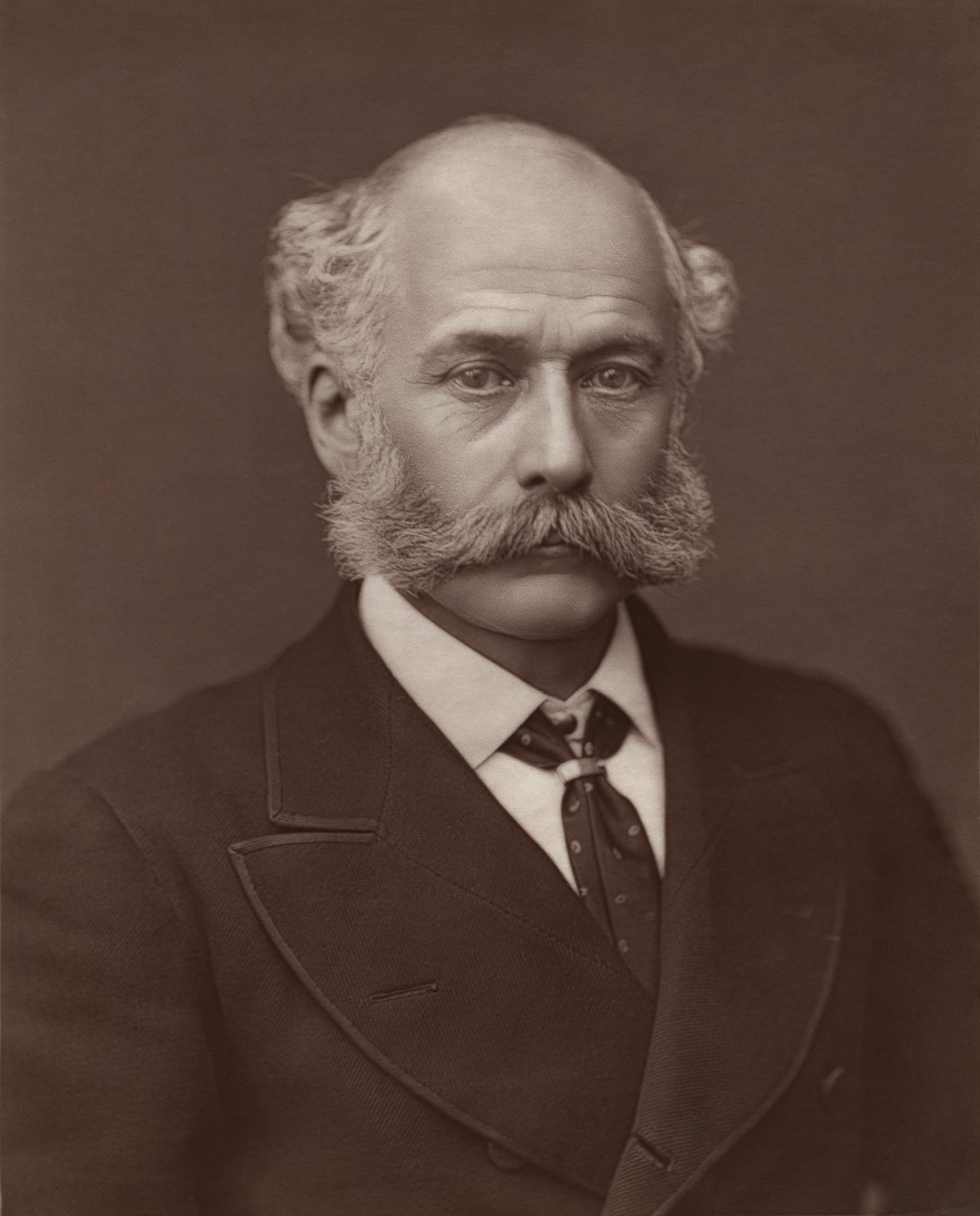
- Bazalgette, c. 1864–1877
- Born: Joseph William Bazalgette; 28 March 1819; Clay Hill, Middlesex, England
- Died: 15 March 1891 (aged 71); Wimbledon, Surrey, England
- Occupation: Civil engineer
- Spouse: Maria Kough (m. 1845)
- Children: 11

Sir Joseph William Bazalgette (/ˈbæzəldʒɛt/; 28 March 1819 – 15 March 1891) was a British civil engineer. As Chief Engineer of London's Metropolitan Board of Works, his major achievement was the creation of the London Main Drainage, the sewerage system for central London, in response to the Great Stink of 1858, which was instrumental in relieving the city of cholera epidemics, while beginning to clean the River Thames.

According to the BBC, "Bazalgette drove himself to the limits in realising his subterranean dream". The first modern sewage system, which began construction in 1859, was described by The Guardian as "a wonder of the industrial world". With only minor modifications, Bazalgette's engineering achievement remains the basis for sewerage design up into the present day.

Bazalgette was knighted by Queen Victoria in 1875, and he was elected President of the Institution of Civil Engineers in 1883. He later designed the second and current Hammersmith Bridge, which opened in 1887.

== Early life ==
Bazalgette was born at Hill Lodge, Clay Hill, Enfield, the son of Joseph William Bazalgette (1783–1849), a retired Royal Navy commander, and Theresa Philo née Pilton (1796–1850). His grandfather, Louis Bazalgette, a tailor and financier, was an economic migrant from Ispagnac in Lozère, France, who became principal tailor to the Prince of Wales, the future George IV, and subsequently became wealthy. (Note: Louis Bazalgette's tailoring account for the Prince Regent (who later became King George IV) was worth over 2 million pounds (adjusted for inflation) and was guaranteed by Parliament.)

Bazalgette family arms

In 1827, when Joseph was eight years old, the family moved into a newly built house in Hamilton Terrace, St John's Wood, London. He spent his early career articled to the noted engineer Sir John Macneill, working on railway projects, and amassed sufficient experience (partly in China and Ireland) in land drainage and reclamation to enable him to set up his own London consulting practice in 1842.

In 1845, the house in Hamilton Terrace was sold, and Joseph married Maria Kough, from County Kilkenny in Ireland. At the time, he was working so hard on expanding the railway network that two years later, in 1847, he suffered a nervous breakdown.

In 1847, while he was recovering, London's Metropolitan Commission of Sewers ordered that all cesspits should be closed and that house drains should connect to sewers and empty into the Thames. A cholera epidemic ensued, killing 14,137 Londoners in 1849.

Bazalgette was appointed Assistant Surveyor to the Metropolitan Commission in 1849, taking over as Engineer in 1852 after his predecessor died of "harassing fatigues and anxieties." Soon after, another cholera epidemic struck in 1853, killing 10,738. Medical opinion at the time held that cholera was caused by foul air: a so-called "miasma". Physician John Snow had earlier advanced a different explanation, which is now known to be correct: cholera was spread by contaminated water, but his view was not then generally accepted.

Championed by fellow engineer Isambard Kingdom Brunel, Bazalgette was promoted Chief Engineer of the Commission's successor, the Metropolitan Board of Works, in 1856 (a post which he retained until the MBW was abolished and replaced by London County Council in 1889). In 1858, the year of the Great Stink, Parliament passed an Enabling Act, despite the colossal expense of the project, and Bazalgette's proposals to revolutionise London's sewerage system began to be implemented. The expectation was that enclosed sewers would eliminate the miasma that was thought to be the cause of cholera and, as a result, eliminate cholera epidemics.

== Sewer works ==
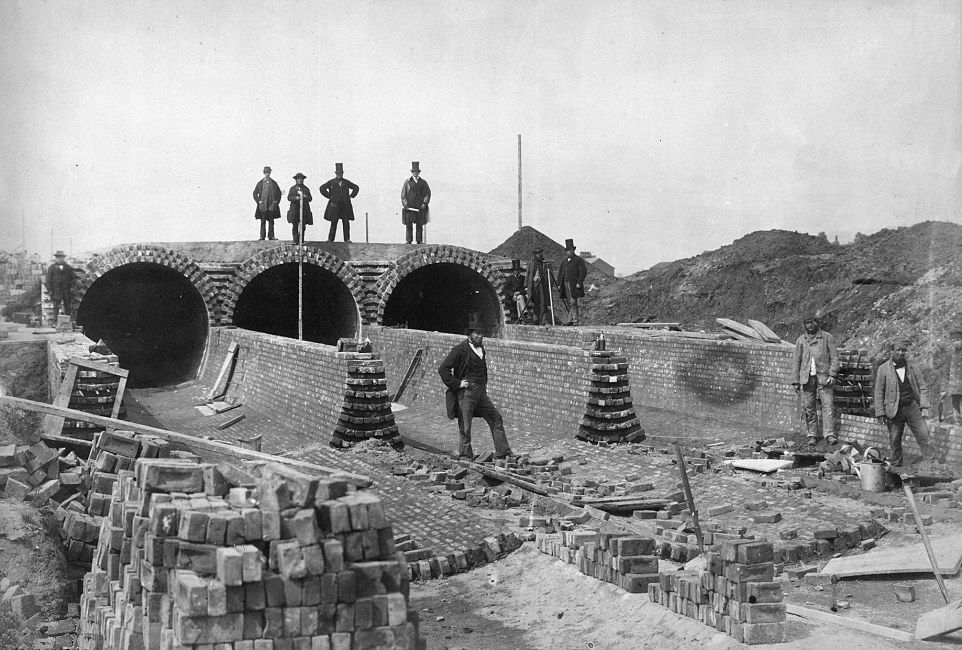
The London sewer system being built in 1860 led by Bazalgette (top right)

At that time, the River Thames was little more than an open sewer, empty of any fish or other wildlife, and an apparent public health hazard to Londoners. Bazalgette's solution (similar to a proposal made by painter John Martin 25 years earlier) was to construct a network of 82 miles (132 km) of enclosed underground brick main sewers to intercept sewage outflows, and 1,100 miles (1,800 km) of street sewers, to divert the raw sewage which flowed freely through the streets and thoroughfares of London to the river. The innovative use of Portland cement has ensured the tunnels were in good order 150 years later.

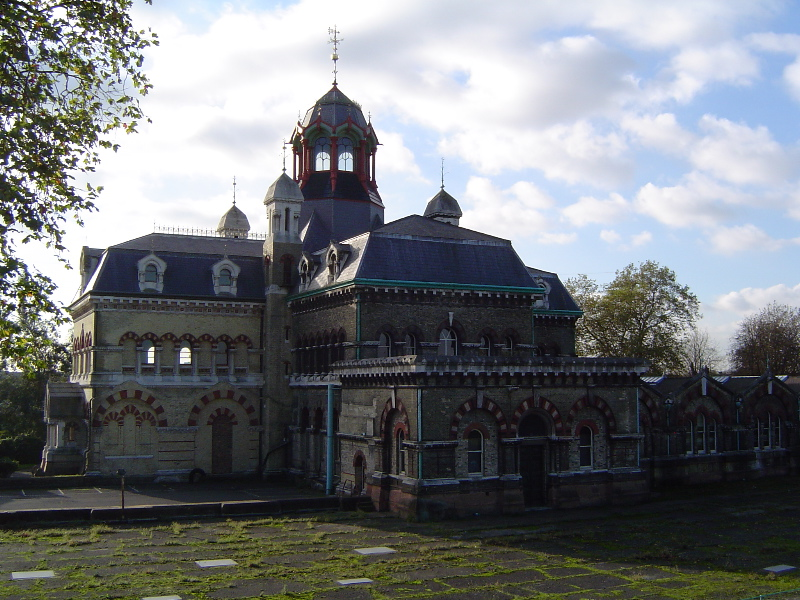
The old Abbey Mills Pumping Station in Mill Meads, East London

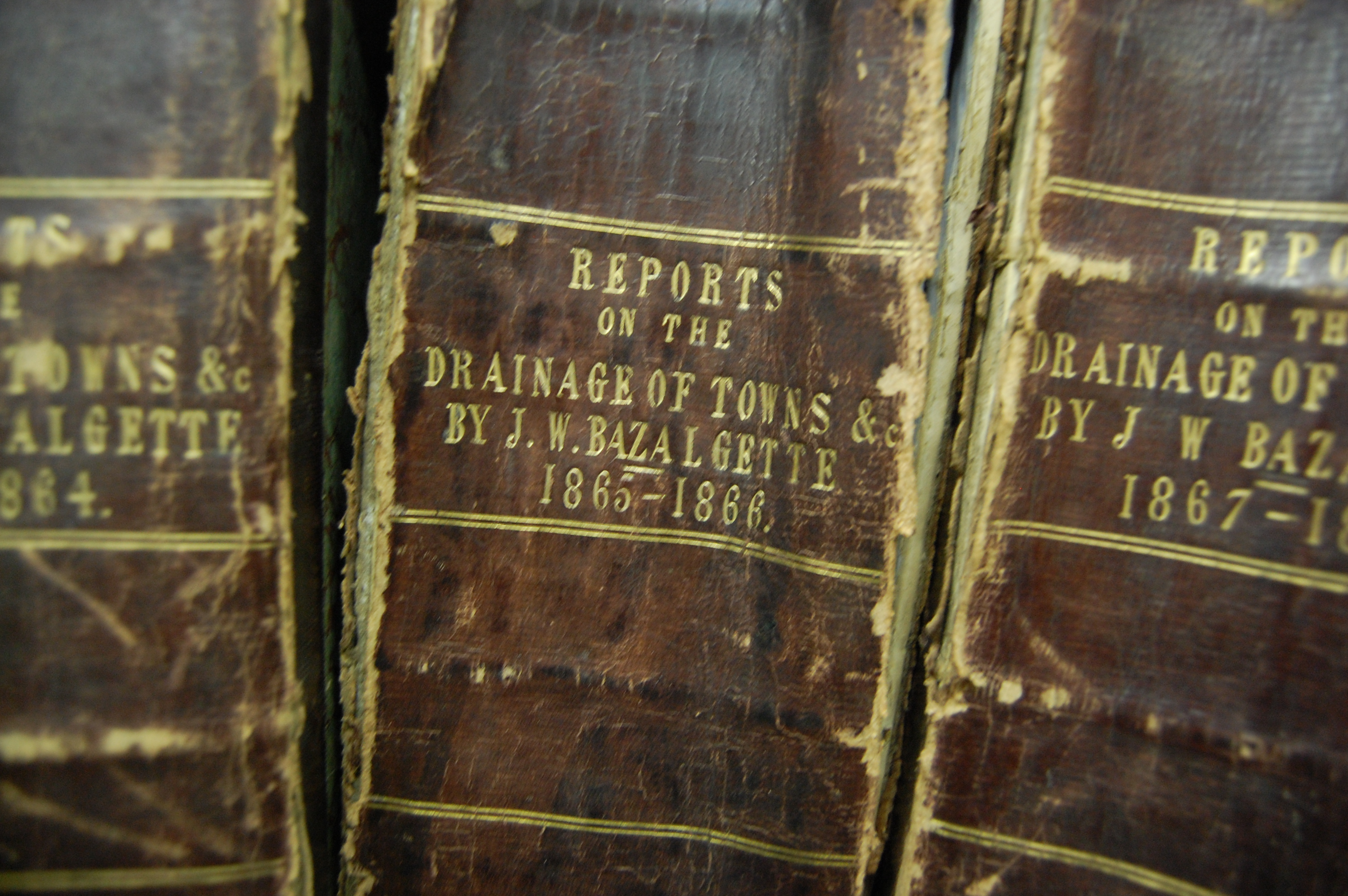
Drainage reports by Bazalgette in the Institution of Civil Engineers archives

The plan included major pumping stations at Deptford (1864) and at Crossness (1865) on the Erith marshes, both on the south side of the Thames and at Abbey Mills (in the River Lea valley, 1868) and on the Chelsea Embankment (close to Grosvenor Bridge; 1875), north of the river. The outflows were diverted downstream, where they were collected in two large sewage outfall systems on the north and south sides of the Thames, called the Northern and Southern Outfall Sewers. The sewage from the Outfall Sewers was originally collected in balancing tanks in Beckton and Crossness, then dumped, untreated, into the Thames at high tide. The system was opened by Albert Edward, Prince of Wales in 1865, although the whole project was not completed for another ten years.

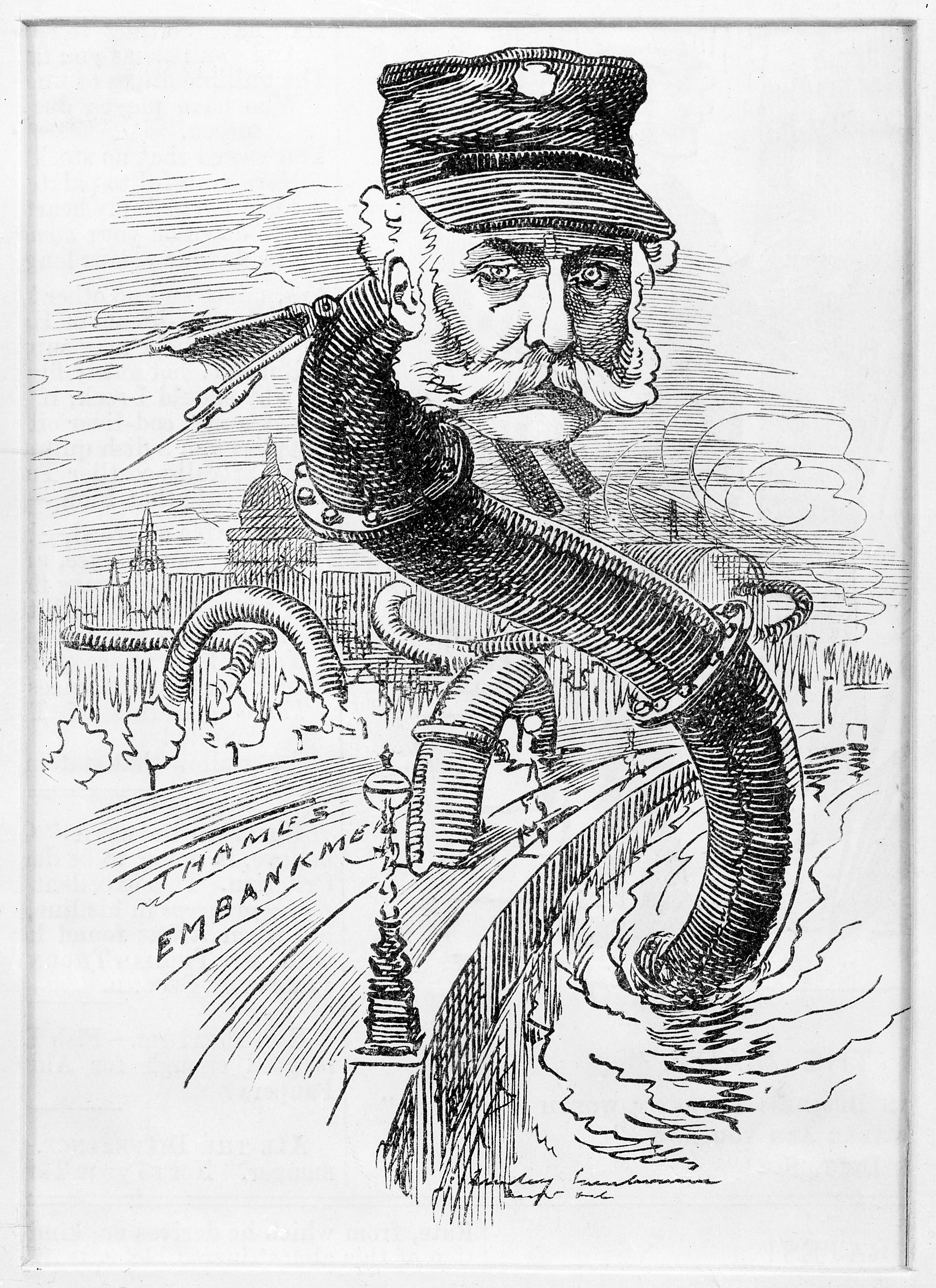
Bazalgette as the "Sewer Snake", Punch, 1883

Partly as a result of the Princess Alice disaster, extensive sewage treatment facilities were built to replace the balancing tanks in Beckton and Crossness in 1900. The biological treatment of sewage was first undertaken in 1885 by William Dibdin, chief chemist for the Metropolitan Board of Works, based on a proposal by Edward Frankland.

The basic premise of this expensive project, that miasma spreads cholera infection, was wrong. However, the new sewer system's unintended consequence was removing the causal bacterium from the water supply, thereby eliminating cholera in areas served by the sewers. Instead of the incorrect premise causing the project to fail, the new sewers mostly eliminated cholera, and also decreased the incidence of typhus and typhoid epidemics.

Bazalgette's capacity for hard work was remarkable; every connection to the sewerage system by the various Vestry Councils had to be checked, and Bazalgette did this himself, and the records contain thousands of linen plans with handwritten comments in Indian ink on them "Approved JWB", "I do not like 6" used here and 9" should be used. JWB", and so on.

== Family ==
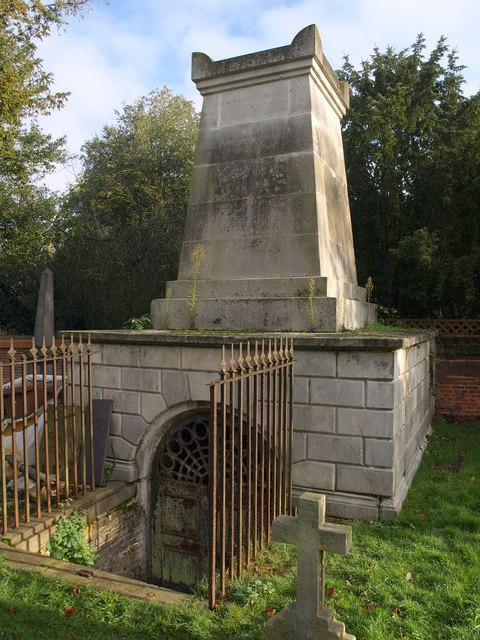
Bazalgette Mausoleum, St Mary's Church, Wimbledon

Scion of a Huguenot family, Bazalgette was brought up at 17 Hamilton Terrace, St John's Wood in North West London. In 1845, he moved to Morden, then in 1873 to Arthur Road, Wimbledon, where he died in 1891. He was buried at nearby St Mary's Church, Wimbledon.

Married in 1845, in Westminster, to Maria Kough (1819–1902), daughter of Edward Kough, Esq., JP (Ireland), of Wexford. Sir Joseph and Lady Bazalgette had eleven children, many who had issue:

1. Joseph William Bazalgette, born 20 February 1846
2. Charles Norman Bazalgette, Esq. (3 March 1847 – 1888), married 6 December 1879 Ethel Mary Boustead (daughter of John Boustead (15 April 1822 British Ceylon – 20 October 1904 15 Princes Gate, Knightsbridge, London)
  1. Norman Bazalgette, gentleman (1883–1911), married 1903 Mary Leslie MacGregor (daughter of John S. MacGregor, of Edinburgh)
    1. Charles Leslie Digby Bazalgette, gentleman, born 1904
    2. Tom Norman Bazalgette, gentleman, born 1907
3. Edward Bazalgette, born 28 June 1848
4. Theresa Philo Bazalgette, born 11 August 1850
5. Caroline Bazalgette, born 17 July 1852; married George Chatterton
6. Maria Bazalgette, born 1854; married Robert Wickham
7. Henry Bazalgette, born 14 September 1855
8. Willoughby Bazalgette, born 18 March 1857
9. Maria Louise Bazalgette, born 1859; died unmarried
10. Anna Constance Bazalgette, born 3 December 1859, married Major Frederick Blacker
11. Evelyn Bazalgette, born 1 April 1861

== Awards and memorials ==
Knighted by Queen Victoria in 1875. Bazalgette received a grant of arms (differenced from the ancestral Bazalgette family arms): "Bazalgette (H. Coll.). Argent, on a fesse gules three crescents of the first, a chief azure, thereon two crosses flory or. Mantling gules and argent. Crest – On a wreath of the colours, a lion rampant argent, gorged with a collar azure, charged with two crosses flory, as in the arms, holding in the dexter forepaw a sword erect proper, pommel and hilt gold, and the dexter hind paw resting on a crescent or. — Sir Joseph William Bazalgette, Knt. Bach., C.B., designer of the Thames Embankment." His granted arms have been displayed by several of his sons, grandsons and descendants.

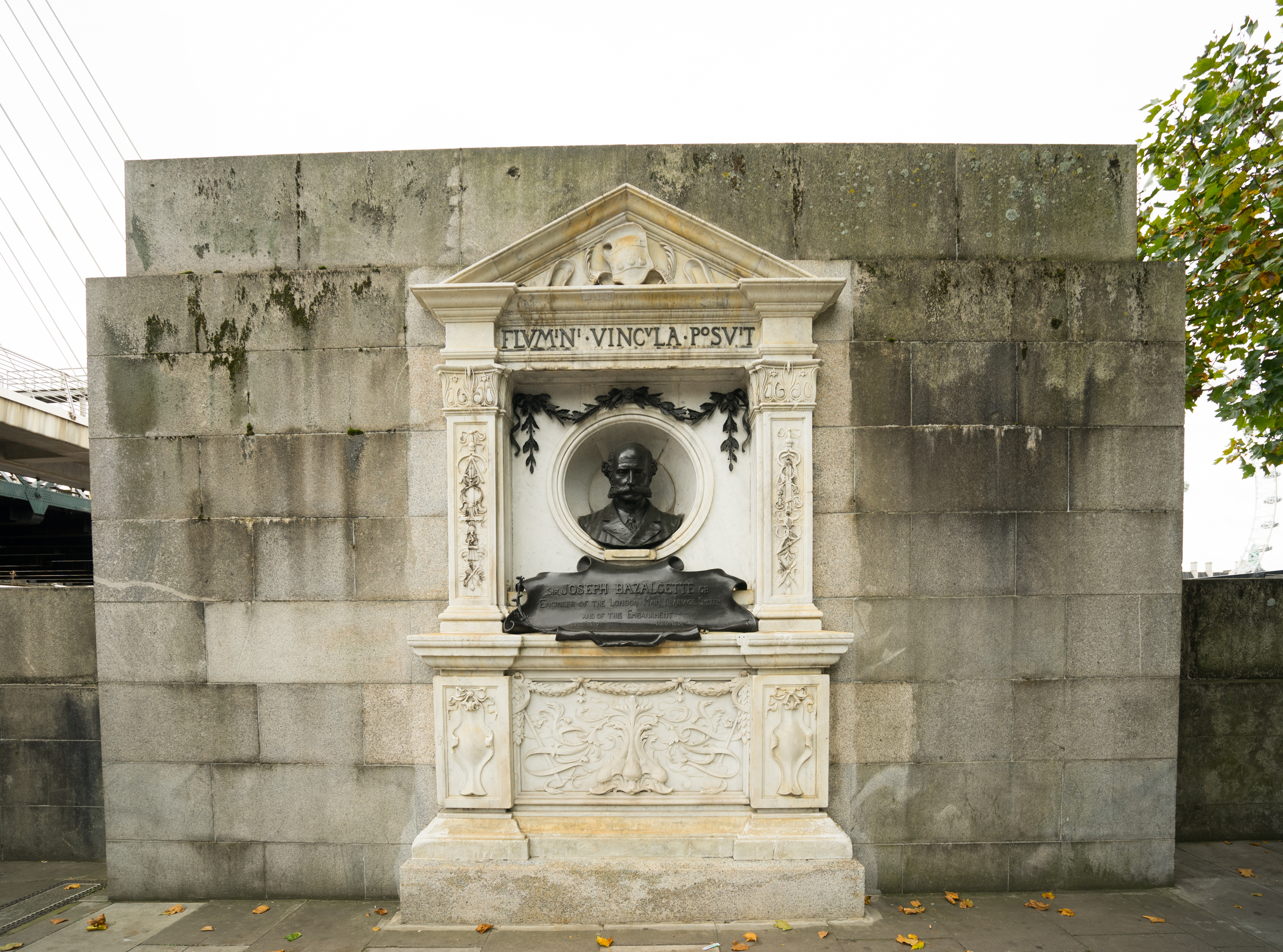
Memorial to Sir Joseph Bazalgette on Victoria Embankment, London WC2

Bazalgette was elected President of the Institution of Civil Engineers in 1883.

A Greater London Council blue plaque commemorates him at 17 Hamilton Terrace in St John's Wood in North London, as well as a formal monument on the Victoria Embankment by the River Thames in central London. In July 2020, the City of London Corporation announced that a new public space west of Blackfriars Bridge, formed following construction of the Thames Tideway Scheme, would be named the Bazalgette Embankment.

Dulwich College has a scholarship in his name, either for design and technology or for mathematics and science.

== Other works ==
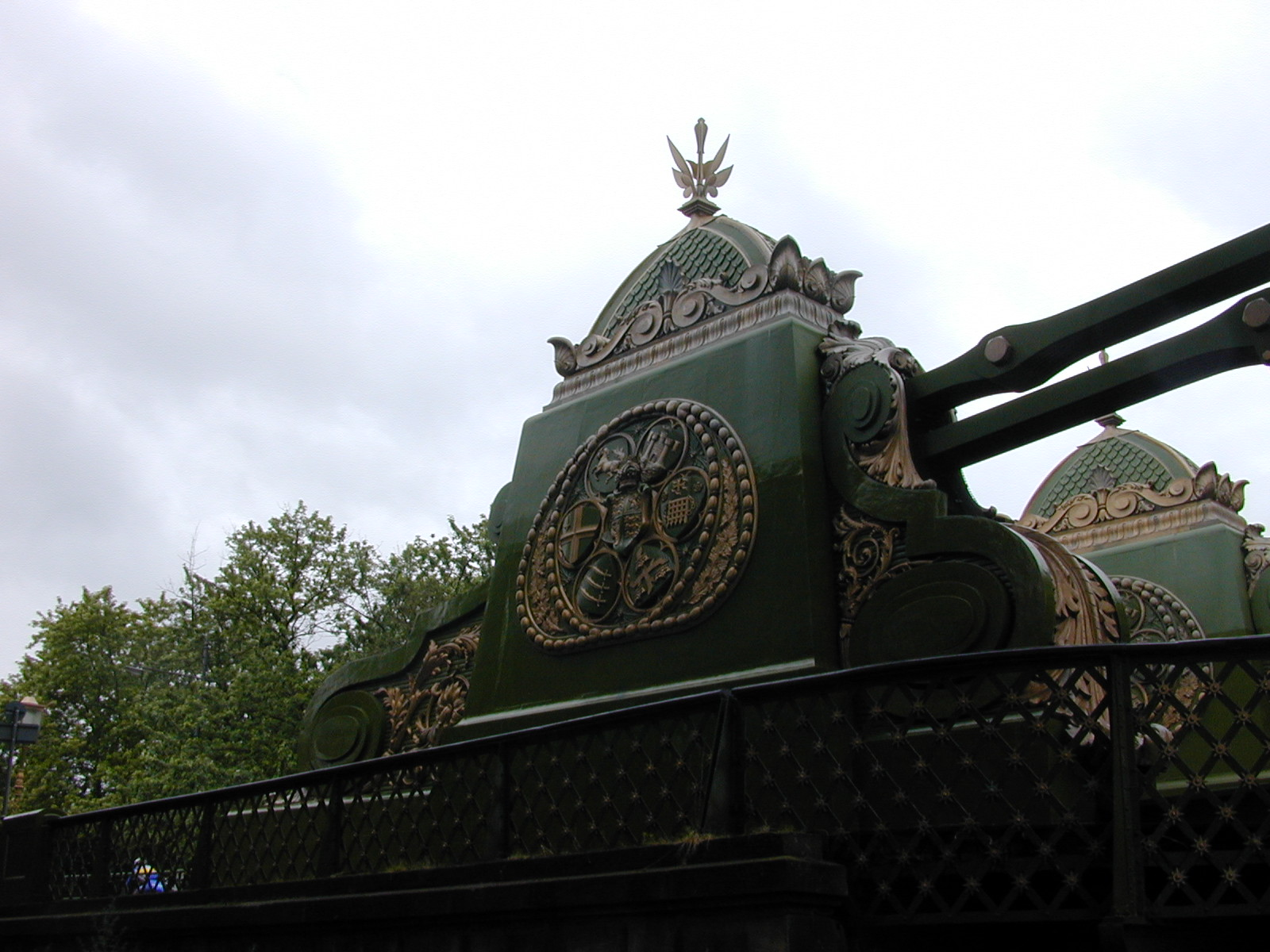
Detail of Hammersmith Bridge, designed by Bazalgette

- Albert Embankment (1869)
- Victoria Embankment (1870)
- Chelsea Embankment (1874)
- Maidstone Bridge (1879)
- Albert Bridge (1884; modifications)
- Putney Bridge (1886)
- Hammersmith Bridge (1887)
- The Woolwich Free Ferry (1889)
- Battersea Bridge (1890)
- Shaftesbury Avenue (1886)
- Early plans for the Blackwall Tunnel (1897)
- Charing Cross Road
- Garrick Street
- Northumberland Avenue
- Proposal for what later became Tower Bridge

== Notable descendants ==
- Christopher Bazalgette (great-grandson), amateur cricketer
- Will Bazalgette (great-grandson), RAFVR pilot awarded the Victoria Cross
- Edward Bazalgette (great-great-grandson), musician and television director
- Sir Peter Bazalgette (great-great-grandson), television producer

== See also ==
- History of public health in the United Kingdom

Professional and academic associations
| Preceded by Sir James Brunlees | President of the Institution of Civil Engineers; December 1883 – December 1884 | Succeeded by Sir Frederick Bramwell |
