= Ian Marchant (businessman) =

English accountant and businessman (born 1961)

- Born: Ian Derek Marchant; 9 February 1961 (age 65); Croydon
- Education: Trinity School of John Whitgift
- Alma mater: Durham University
- Occupation: Businessman
- Years active: 1983–present
- Spouse: Elizabeth Anderson

Ian Derek Marchant (born 9 February 1961) is an English accountant and businessman. He was the Chief executive officer of Scottish and Southern Energy from 2002 to June 2013 and chairman of Thames Water from 2018 to July 2023. Since 2023, he has held various positions at Morgan Advanced Materials.

== Early life ==
Born in Croydon, Marchant attended the independent Trinity School of John Whitgift. Afterwards, he studied at Durham University as a member of Hatfield College, gaining a 2:1 in Economics in 1983.

== Career ==
He was an accountant for PricewaterhouseCoopers from 1983 to 1992. In 1992, he joined Southern Electric, which became Scottish and Southern Energy (SSE) in 1998, when he was appointed the company's finance director. He became CEO of SSE in 2002 when aged 41, making him then one of the youngest FTSE 100 chief executives.

Marchant received an Honorary Doctorate from Heriot-Watt University in 2009.

In January 2018, Marchant was appointed chairman of Thames Water, stepping down on 10 July 2023. He is also the chair of Logan Energy, a non-executive director of Aggreko, and a past chairman of John Wood Group, Nova Innovation, and Infinis.

On 1 February 2023, he was appointed Non-executive director of Morgan Advanced Materials plc. Since 29 June 2023, he has served as the group's Non-executive Chairman and Nomination Committee Chairman.

He founded and chaired the Scotland 2020 Climate Group and Scotland's 'Lights up Malawi' campaign for climate justice. He is a past president of the Energy Institute and an honorary president of the Royal Zoological Society of Scotland.

Business positions
Preceded by Jim Forbes	Chief Executive of SSE plc 2002 - June 2013	Succeeded by Alistair Phillips-Davies
Preceded by	Chairman of Thames Water; January 2018 - July 2023	Succeeded by Sir Adrian Montague
Preceded by Douglas Caster	Chairman of Morgan Advanced Materials; January 2023 - now	Succeeded by
