= Charles Banner, Baron Banner =

British lawyer (born 1980)

The Right Honourable The Lord Banner KC FRGS
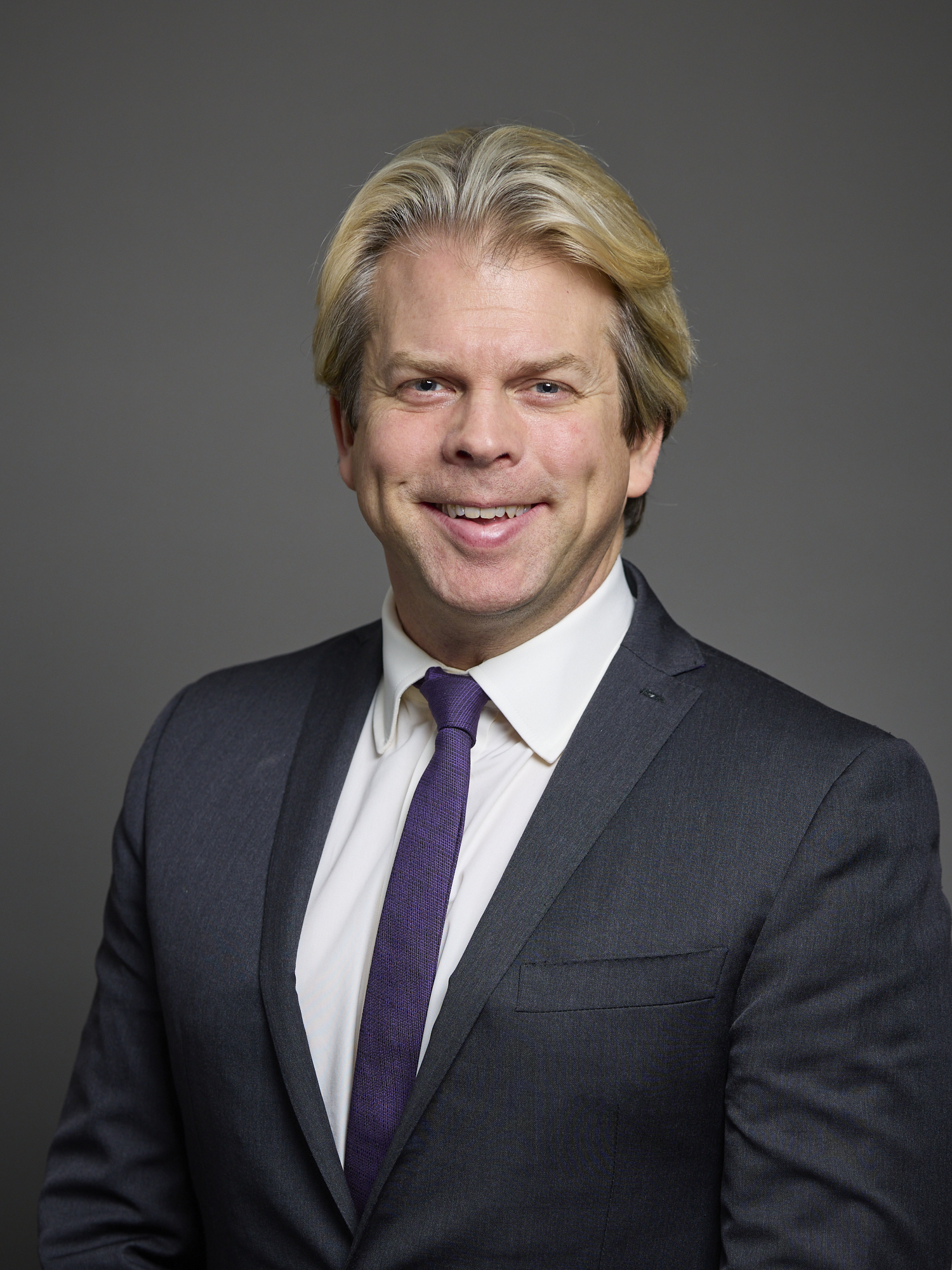
- Official portrait, 2025

Member of the House of Lords
- Lord Temporal
- Life peerage 6 March 2024

Personal details
- Born: Charles Edward Raymond Banner; 3 June 1980 (age 46) Birmingham, England
- Party: Conservative
- Spouse: Tetyana Nesterchuk
- Education: Lincoln College, Oxford; City, University of London; King's College London
- Occupation: Barista

Charles Edward Raymond Banner, Baron Banner (born 3 June 1980), is a British lawyer and life peer. He was appointed a member of the House of Lords in 2024.

== Early life ==
Banner was born on 3 June 1980 in Birmingham to Dr Edward Raymond Banner, a consultant psychiatrist, and Rachel Nimmo Banner (née Macfarlane), of the Nimmo family who founded and operated the Castle Eden Brewery, and was raised near Barnt Green on the outskirts of Birmingham. He is the nephew by marriage of Robert Conquest.

He was educated at King Edward's School, Birmingham, and read classics (literae humaniores) at Lincoln College, Oxford, graduating with an upper second-class honours in 2002. He then studied for the Postgraduate Diploma in Law at City, University of London, and graduated from King's College London in 2004 after studying EU law. Whilst undertaking his postgraduate law studies in London from 2002 until 2004, he was the first intern at the recently established Policy Exchange, later becoming a Research Fellow, working on policing and constitutional reform.

During 2008 he worked on secondment in Hong Kong at the law firm Mayer Brown JSM and as a Judicial Assistant to the Hong Kong Court of Final Appeal and Court of Appeal (Hong Kong). In October 2008 he was part of the Royal Hong Kong Yacht Club Quad scull crew that won the Around the Island Race, with the second fastest time ever recorded for a circumnavigation of Hong Kong island by a rowing boat.

== Professional career ==
Banner was called to the bar of England and Wales in 2004 at Lincoln's Inn, and to the bar of Northern Ireland in 2010. Before embarking on private practice, he was seconded as a judicial assistant in 2005 to Lord Nicholls of Birkenhead, Lord Rodger of Earlsferry and Lord Brown of Eaton-under-Heywood in the House of Lords. Banner was appointed Queen's Counsel in 2019; at the age of 38, he was the youngest barrister to be appointed in that year. He joined Keating Chambers in 2020 to establish their practice in planning and environment law, to complement their established standing in construction, infrastructure and public procurement law. He practises in all those areas, as well as public law and commercial dispute resolution more generally.

He has acted in over 200 reported cases, including 19 Supreme Court appeals (making him one of the top ten currently practising barristers by number of appearances in the Supreme Court since its opening in 2009), notable examples being R(Cart) v. Upper Tribunal [2012] 1 AC 663 concerning the constitutional principles relating to judicial review, R(Al-Skeini) v. Secretary of State for Defence [2008] 1 AC 153 concerning the territorial scope of the Human Rights Act 1998, in which as a junior barrister he was led by Keir Starmer who was then a practising Queen’s Counsel, as well as judicial reviews concerning HS2 (R (HS2 Action Alliance Ltd) v Secretary of State for Transport), the proposed third runway at Heathrow Airport, the expansion of Stansted Airport, a new stadium at Casement Park., and the Abingdon Reservoir. He acted for the opponents of the People's Republic of China's proposed new Embassy in London and of the National Grid plc's proposals for 180 km of new pylons between Norwich and Tilbury.

From 2019 until 2025, he sat as a part-time judge of the Astana International Financial Centre Court in Astana, Kazakhstan. He is the founder and co-presenter of the high-profile planning and land use related charity podcast, Have We Got Planning News For You. He was 'Highly Commended' in the 'Barrister of the Year' category at the Lawyer Awards 2025, and was voted the No. 1 planning specialist King's Counsel in Planning Magazine's Planning Law Survey 2025, retaining the title in 2026.

He has held non-executive board positions at Surinder Arora's Arora Group (2026–present), the property developer SAV Group (2022–2025), Royal Institution of Chartered Surveyors (2018–2023), the Joint Nature Conservation Committee (2017–2024; including as deputy chair, 2021–2023; and interim chair, 2023–2024) and the European Union's Fundamental Rights Agency (2017–2020).

== Political career ==
Nominated by Prime Minister Rishi Sunak, Banner was created a life peer on 6 March 2024 as Baron Banner, of Barnt Green in the County of Worcestershire. He was introduced to the House of Lords as a Conservative peer on 18 March. He gave his maiden speech on 19 April 2024 on the subject of the impact of environmental regulations on development. His subsequent spoken contributions in the House of Lords have focused on planning and infrastructure, the environment, justice and the constitution, defence and foreign policy. He is an advocate of expanding the United Kingdom's independent nuclear deterrent.

In March 2024, Banner was appointed by the government to lead an independent review into national infrastructure projects to streamline their procedure and cut down legal challenges. The Banner Review's report was published in October 2024, alongside a Government 'Call For Evidence' paper. In January 2025, Prime Minister Keir Starmer announced that the Government would give effect to the Banner Review's recommendations. The Planning and Infrastructure Bill, presented to the UK Parliament in March 2025, contained provisions to give legislative force to Banner's recommendations.

In January 2025, he spoke out in defence of Attorney General Richard Hermer, who had been criticised in the conservative media for having previously represented clients such as Gerry Adams and Shamina Begum, citing the "cab rank rule" of the independent bar in the UK as playing a critical role in ensuring equality before the law.

In April 2025, he was one of 21 UK Parliamentarians sanctioned by Russia in response to their support for sanctioned Russian state assets to be given to Ukraine as a down-payment for reparations owed for the invasion of Ukraine.

In June 2025, Banner and former UK Supreme Court President Baroness Hale of Richmond tabled an amendment to the Children's Wellbeing and Schools Bill to incorporate the United Nations Convention on the Rights of the Child into domestic English law.

== Personal life ==
Banner is a Patron of the Restart Foundation (a charity focused upon improving mental health in Ukraine), a Trustee of Prism the Gift Fund (a facilitator for charitable giving), and a supporter of Sir Brian May's animal-welfare and nature-conservation organisation Save Me.

He has run 11 London Marathons and has climbed several mountains including two of the Seven Summits.

He is a rock music enthusiast and advocate of live music venues.

Orders of precedence in the United Kingdom
Preceded by The Lord Cameron of Lochiel	Gentlemen; Baron Banner	Followed by The Lord Shamash
