= Thames Gateway Water Treatment Works =

Desalination plant in London, England

Coordinates: 51.51554°N 0.09278°E

- Interactive map of Thames Gateway Water Treatment Works
- Daily capacity: 100 megalitres
- Cost: £250 million
- Energy usage: 14 MW
- Technology: Reverse osmosis
- Completion date: 2 June 2010

The Thames Gateway Water Treatment Works or Beckton Desalination Plant is a desalination plant in Beckton, London, adjacent to Beckton Sewage Treatment Works. The plant takes brackish water from the River Thames and converts it into drinkable water through a reverse osmosis process. The first of its kind in the UK, it was built for Thames Water by a consortium of Interserve, Atkins Water and Acciona Agua. It was opened by Prince Philip, Duke of Edinburgh, on 2 June 2010. It was planned to provide up to 150 million litres of drinking water each day – enough for 900,000 Londoners. – but by 2025 had only operated on five occasions, and at two-thirds of its planned capacity.

== Background ==
Much of the supplied area is classed by the Environment Agency as 'seriously water stressed'. Customers in London, Swindon and Oxford see hose pipe bans during quite minor droughts. The plant is built to treat water from brackish outflows of the Tideway. Turning this into drinking water is a way to reduce such bans and postpone the risk of severe water rationing into the long term; see the Thames Water Abingdon Reservoir scheme for longer-term supply infrastructure expansion.

Section 37 of the Water Act 2003 repealed Section 1 of the Metropolis Water Act 1852. This move ended the ban of the Tideway as a supply of water for drinking, being "no longer required to protect public health" per Baroness Farrington of Ribbleton and Baroness Byford.

Architects Broadway Malyan designed the plan to RIBA Stage D and acted as expert witness at public enquiry.

== Facts and figures ==
The plant was planned to supply 150 million litres of water a day which caters for 400,000 households or 900,000 people in the high-demand seasons when it is most-run. Its supply is pumped to north-east London in an 8-mile (13 km) pipe which can hold 14 million litres of water, of 1.2 metre diameter. The peak energy consumption of the plant is 17.6 MW in worst-case conditions, and the average power consumption was estimated at 14 MW, which results in an energy usage of 2.27 kWh per cubic metre of water produced.

In 2022, Thames Water revised the usable output of the plant down to 100 megalitres per day, because of "unrealistic expectations" in the design.

== Development ==
The total cost of the scheme including the pipeline was £250 million. The route avoided much disturbance to residents. All construction sites were environmentally screened and the surrounds returned to their original condition.

Thames Water had planned to build four more desalination plants, but this has not progressed.

== Operation ==
The plant takes water from the Tideway during the last three hours of ebb, storing the water in a reservoir to minimise the salinity of the water processed. The water is first treated by a conventional settlement and filtration before the salinity is removed by reverse osmosis. Mineral salts, as found in the company's conventional water sources, are added before final purification.

The plant is intended to be used during times of low natural water supply and exceptional demand. The operating licence dictates that the plant can only be operated if required by Thames Water's drought management plan, when the river flows at Teddington are less than 3000 megalitres per day. It can also be used in operational emergencies.

In 2022, some industry sources said the plant had been effectively mothballed because of high running costs. It was not used in the very dry conditions of summer 2022 because of "necessary planned work". Labelled a "white elephant" by MPs, Beckton has operated just three times by June 2023 since it opened and can only supply two-thirds of its planned 150 million litres a day. In 2023, Thames Water said difficulties sourcing the carbon dioxide needed to make the water drinkable meant it would be unavailable until July 2023.

By September 2025, the plant had run only five times providing about seven days of London's typical supply. It had cost £518 million in total, or about 7p per litre, about 28 times usual water cost.

== Criticism ==
London Mayor Ken Livingstone criticised the plant in 2007, calling it a "misguided and a retrograde step in UK environmental policy." Livingstone, arguing that the plant was expensive and unnecessary, said that Thames Water should instead focus on reducing waste caused by leakage and that people should be encouraged "to use less water, not more." Livingstone blocked the plans as “unnecessary and unsustainable”, but it was given approval when Boris Johnson became mayor in 2008.
