= Thames Water =

UK water company

Thames Water Utilities Limited

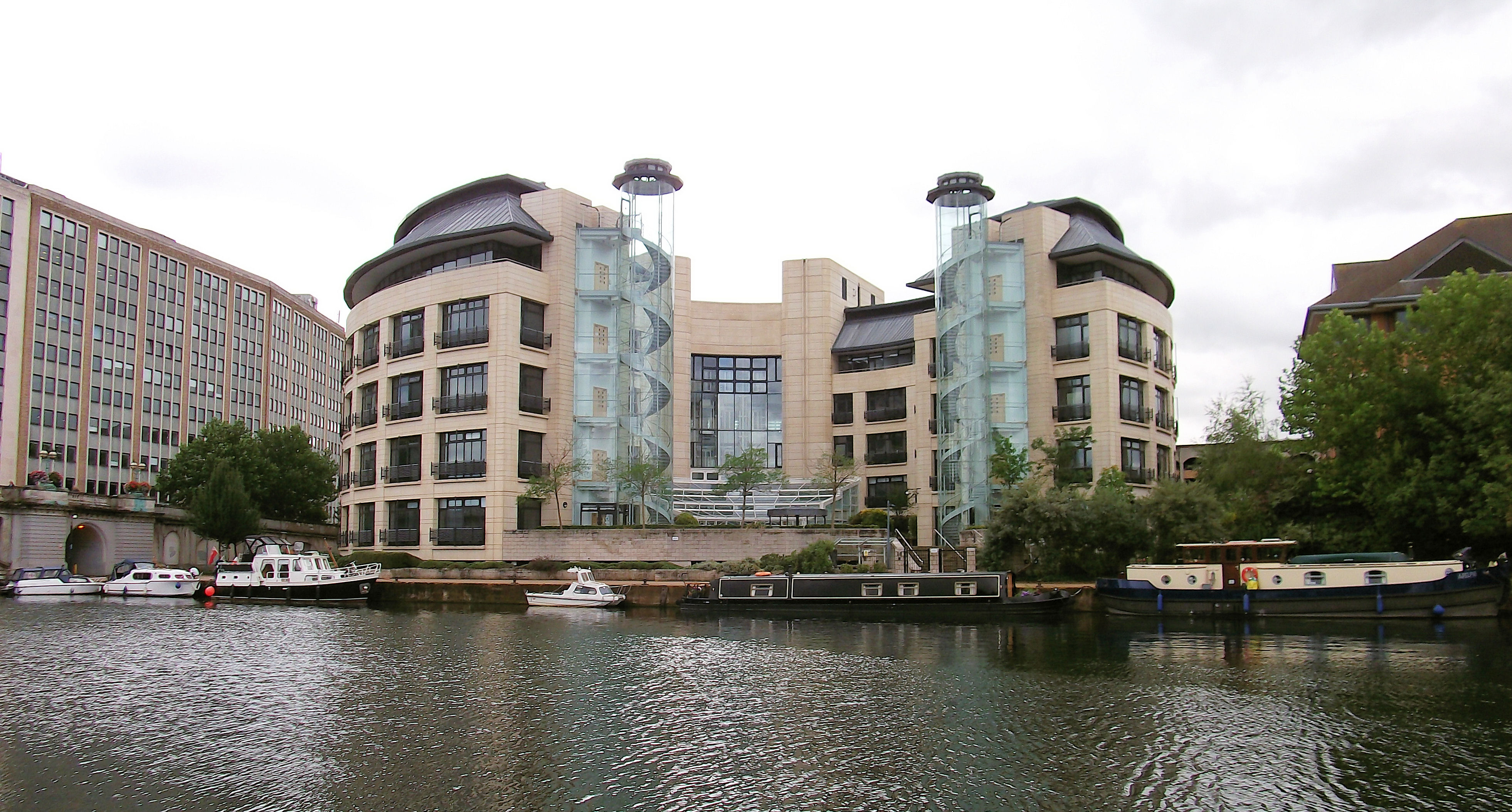
- Thames Water's headquarters in Reading
- Type: Subsidiary
- Industry: Water industry
- Predecessor: Thames Water Authority
- Founded: 1 April 1989; 37 years ago in London, England
- Headquarters: Reading, Berkshire, England
- Area served: United Kingdom, but principally South England
- Key people: Adrian Montague (Chairman); Chris Weston (CEO)
- Products: Drinking water; Recycled wastewater; Biosolid fertilisers; Recovered phosphates; Renewable energy
- Production output: 2.6 Gl/day (drinking water); 4.3 Gl/day (wastewater treatment)
- Services: Water supply; Sewage treatment
- Revenue: ▲£3,756.5 million (2026); £2,738.2 million (2025)
- Operating income: ▲£1,361.0 million (2026); £471.3 million (2025)
- Net income: ▲£113.0 million (2026); -£1,513.8 million (2025)
- Owners: OMERS (32%); USS (20%); Infinity Investments (10%); 6 other investment funds (38%)
- Number of employees: 8,472 (2026)
- Parent: Thames Water Utilities Holdings Limited
- Website: thameswater.co.uk

Thames Water Utilities Limited, trading as Thames Water, is a British private utility company responsible for the water supply and waste water treatment in most of Greater London, Luton, the Thames Valley, Surrey, Gloucestershire, north Wiltshire, far west Kent, and some other parts of England. Like other water companies, it has a monopoly in the regions it serves.

With origins dating back to the formation of the New River Company in 1609, Thames Water was established in 1989 during privatisation of the water industry in England and Wales. The name of the company reflects its role serving the drainage basin of the River Thames; water is sourced from the Thames as well as a number of other rivers and boreholes.

The UK's largest water and wastewater services company, Thames Water is responsible for an extensive water management infrastructure which includes the Thames Water Ring Main around London, one of Europe's largest wastewater treatment works and the UK's first large-scale desalination plant—both at Beckton in east London—and the £4.2 billion Thames Tideway sewer (which went into service in 2025). Per day, the company supplies 2.6 billion litres (570 million imperial gallons) of drinking water and treats 4.3 billion litres (950 million imperial gallons) of wastewater. It serves a population of 15.5 million people—over a quarter of England's population—but its ageing infrastructure is prone to leakage and is a frequent cause of pollution, for which it has been repeatedly prosecuted and fined.

Current shareholders include four major pension funds and four overseas investment funds which between them hold over 90% of the company's shares. The company has been criticised for paying substantial dividends to shareholders while simultaneously taking out loans, accumulating over £20 billion in debts (as of January 2026). From June 2023, Thames Water was repeatedly said to be close to financial collapse. In April 2024, the UK Government was reported to be considering plans to temporarily renationalise the company (putting it into a special administration regime, SAR), and in January 2025 began talks with potential special administrators. A £3bn emergency bailout was agreed in March 2025 (a further £2.4bn bailout was proposed in October 2026), giving the company more time to repair its finances and avoid running out of cash. In June 2025 the government stepped up preparations for temporary nationalisation of the company, and in June 2026 rejected rescue proposals from the company's core creditors (London & Valley Water; L&VW), saying they did "not do enough to protect consumers or the environment".

== History ==
=== Origins ===
Thames Water can trace its history back to the construction of the New River, which was started in 1604 by Edmund Colthurst to carry fresh water from Hertfordshire into London. The business of the New River was taken over by the New River Company, officially founded by royal charter in 1619, under the leadership of Hugh Myddelton. Although earlier small-scale water supply operations existed, the New River Company was the first water supply company and is the earliest direct ancestor of Thames Water today.

During the 1850s, John Snow and William Farr's identification of the 1854 Broad Street cholera outbreak provided a stimulus for the better treatment of sewage. The Thames Conservancy was established in 1857 with unified control over water supply, drainage and navigation. The Great Stink occurred in 1858, and focused government and public opinion on cleaning up the Thames. To resolve these issues, the Metropolitan Board of Works, under the leadership of Chief Engineer Joseph Bazalgette, constructed a large network of sewers by 1870, many of which are still in use today.

In 1904 the New River Company and eight other water companies serving London were taken into public ownership under the control of the newly-founded Metropolitan Water Board. In 1973 the responsibility for water supply and sewage in the Thames catchment was transferred to the Thames Water Authority.

=== Privatisation ===
In 1989, the responsibility for navigation, regulatory, river and channels management was transferred from the Thames Water Authority to the National Rivers Authority, which became part of the Environment Agency in 1996. The remainder of the Thames Water Authority was privatised as Thames Water Utilities Limited under the Water Act 1989.

=== Takeovers ===
Thames Water plc was acquired by the German utility company RWE in 2001.

On 17 October 2006, following several years of criticism about failed leakage targets in the UK, RWE announced it would sell Thames Water for £8 billion to Kemble Water Holdings Ltd, a consortium led by the Australian Macquarie Group which appointed David Owens as CEO. In December 2006, the sale of Thames Water's British operation went ahead, with RWE keeping the overseas operations.

Under the new ownership, the company re-focused its efforts on improving its operational performance and in 2007 announced the largest-ever capital investment programme (£1 billion in one year) of any UK water company.

However, during the 11 years of Macquarie's ownership ending in 2017, there were substantial dividend payouts to shareholders. In this period debts increased from £4.14 billion to £10.5 billion (both 2017 prices) as Macquarie borrowed against the company's assets to increase dividend payments. During these 11 years £2.8 billion was paid to shareholders, 40% of the total £7 billion in dividends paid by Thames Water in the 32 years from 1990 to 2022.

Thames Water was a Tier Three sponsor of the 2012 Summer Olympics in London.

=== Sale by Macquarie ===
From 2017, under the government's Open Water programme, and in common with all water and sewerage companies, Thames Water was required to provide entirely separate retail and wholesale operations for its commercial customers, working through a central market operator.

On 14 March 2017, Macquarie Group sold its remaining stake in Thames Water's holding company to Canadian pensions group OMERS and the Kuwait Investment Authority.

On 22 March 2017 a record fine of £20.3m was imposed on Thames Water after large leaks of untreated sewage, totalling 1.4bn litres, occurred over a number of years.

=== 2023–2026 financial crisis ===
In its annual report for the year ending 31 March 2022, Thames Water had reported annual revenues of around £2bn, generating a profit before interest, taxes, depreciation and amortisation (EBITDA) of around £1bn (a margin of around 50%). Facing high levels of asset depreciation - around £650m - the company has to invest all profits back into the business to maintain the status quo. As of March 2022, Thames Water had, since 2007, accumulated debts of around £15 billion, mainly through the issue of various bonds, with annual interest obligations of the debt standing at around £500m, around 50% of EBITDA. So, after capital investments, the business was not generating sufficient cash to fulfil its interest obligations, and found itself in a continuously worsening financial position. With current debt amounting to 80% of the value of the business, Thames Water had become the most heavily indebted of England and Wales' water companies. This situation had been recognised by the regulator Ofwat in December 2022 - leading to increasingly urgent discussions concerning a possible collapse and potential state bail-out of Thames Water.

After joining Thames Water as CEO in 2020, Sarah Bentley resigned on 27 June 2023 amid concerns over spills from Thames sewage pipes. On 28 June 2023, concerns were raised about the company's ability to service its debt of £14 billion, and the company was then reported to be in urgent talks to secure extra funding to avoid the company collapsing. In 2022, shareholders had provided an initial £500m to Thames Water and pledged a further £1bn, but the company was said to be struggling to service its substantial debt pile. On 29 June 2023, with the UK government reportedly on standby for a potential taxpayer bailout through a temporary nationalisation, with pension funds worried about their investments in the firm, and with suppliers engaged on major projects concerned about payment, Thames Water announced experienced City troubleshooter Sir Adrian Montague would lead rescue efforts, succeeding Ian Marchant as chairman on 10 July 2023. On 2 July 2023, shareholder USS announced its support for the business's turnaround plans. The head of Ofwat said Thames Water customers would not be liable for the costs of any bailout. On 10 July 2023, Thames Water shareholders agreed to provide £750m in funding, short of the £1bn sought; the company also said it would need a further £2.5bn from investors by 2030.

In September 2023, Thames Water was one of several water companies ordered by Ofwat to pay back customers for poor performance. It was ordered to apply reductions totalling £101m to customers' future bills. In October 2023, Thames Water, along with Southern Water, SES Water and South East Water, was named by Ofwat as one of the four worst performing water companies, all needing to dramatically improve their financial performance.

In December 2023, Thames Water told MPs that it did not have enough money to pay off a £190m loan due in April 2024, despite a recent £500m cash injection financed by a loan to its parent company.

Also in December 2023, the company appointed Chris Weston as its new chief executive. Weston took up the position on 8 January 2024 and was to be paid an annual salary of £850,000 and a performance-related bonus of up to 156 per cent, taking his total package to about £2.25 million.

As of March 2024, investors announced they would withhold the first payment of a £4bn turnaround plan unless Ofwat agreed to an increase in customer bills, saying that without it the plan is "uninvestible". Thames Water stated that an increase in bills of 40% would be required over the next five years. Responding to the request, Michael Gove, the UK's housing and communities secretary, stated that "Thames Water leadership has been a 'disgrace'" and customers should not be expected to pay higher bills.

Thames Water was the subject of a documentary, Thames Water: Inside the Crisis, which aired on BBC Two on 18 and 19 March 2025. While some welcomed the fact Thames Water was being "transparent" about the scales of the challenges it faced, the documentary generally faced negative reviews. Rachel Cooke at the New Statesman questioned the logic of Thames Water allowing consumers to see the full scale of the challenges at the water company at a time when public trust in the water sector was at an all-time low. The Daily Telegraph's Ben Marlow argued that the BBC had given Thames Water a "free hit" to portray themselves in a positive light with this documentary, but the company had instead used it to "punch themselves in the face".

==== Possible renationalisation ====
In April 2024, The Guardian reported Whitehall consideration of plans to renationalise Thames Water, with the state taking on most of its £15.6bn debt and lenders losing up to 40% of their money. In May 2024, Thames' biggest shareholder OMERS issued a "full writedown" of its 31.7% stake in Kemble, signalling its view that the shares were now worthless; another (unnamed) lender sought to offload loans worth up to £600m. In June 2024, UK university pension fund USS (holding 20% of the company's shares) was pressed by university staff members to explain why it had invested in Thames Water; it was feared the fund might have to write-off £1 billion of its assets.

In May 2024, Ofwat was reported to be preparing to reject Thames Water's request for consumer bill rises of 59% (after accounting for inflation), with the company's plans derided as a "microwave job" with "fag-packet figures", while Thames' board was said to be determined to "sit on a deckchair on the Titanic". Advised by investment bankers Lazard, Ofwat was trying to make Thames Water attractive to investors, while minimising pressure on consumer bills. On 1 June 2024, Thames Water was set to be fined over £40m by Ofwat for payment of a shareholder dividend in late 2023.

On 11 July 2024, Ofwat put Thames Water into special measures, with a "turnaround oversight regime" subject to "heightened regulatory" scrutiny. Ofwat said Thames Water would be allowed to increase bills by £99 to £535, which was £92 less than the company had proposed. Through to 2029, Thames Water is required to reduce sewage spills by 64%, cut leaks by 19% and reduce supply interruptions by two-thirds.

Also in July 2024, the Financial Times reported Thames Water faced the possibility of over £10 billion of its debt being downgraded to junk status. This potential downgrade by rating agency S&P could trigger regulatory intervention from Ofwat, as Thames Water is required to maintain two investment-grade ratings to comply with its licence.

In August 2024, Thames Water warned its continued survival required it to increase water bills by 59% over a five-year period, rejecting the £19/year cap proposed by Ofwat. The Guardian also reported that Thames Water board members and advisers lobbied Whitehall officials to oppose any temporary renationalisation saying it would adversely affect the appeal of UK businesses to international investors - a view rejected by others who saw Thames as an 'outlier'.

In October 2024, Thames Water proposed a deal to raise a loan of up to £3bn that would enable it survive until October 2025, while increasing the company's debt to £17.9bn by March 2025. In November 2024, Thames Water said three quarters of its creditors had supported the £3 billion funding deal.

In November 2024, a Guardian investigation revealed Thames Water was in a worse financial state than previously admitted. The company had £23bn of assets in urgent need of repair, with supply to 16 million water customers "on a knife-edge", amid concerns over safety, essential IT systems (some dating from the 1980s, now obsolete and prone to cybercrime), and intimidation of staff.

In December 2024, the company appointed Julian Gething as its chief restructuring officer to lead its recapitalisation process. Days later, Thames Water received a £5bn bid from infrastructure investor Covalis Capital who planned to provide about £1bn upfront and raise a further £4bn from asset sales, with France's Suez Group managing restructuring; Octopus Energy later also joined the consortium. Hong Kong-based CK Infrastructure Holdings, Castle Water and Brookfield Asset Management were also potential bidders for Thames Water. And in February 2025, Kohlberg Kravis Roberts offered $5 billion to take control of Thames Water.

Also in December 2024, Thames Water was fined £18.2m by Ofwat after breaching dividend rules on payments made in 2023 and 2024; Ofwat also said it would "claw back value" to recover £131m of the payments. And The Guardian reported Thames Water had deliberately diverted millions of pounds to pay bonuses and dividends rather than pay for environmental clean-ups - steps which could breach the company's licence commitments and be illegal. Government officials believed that Adrian Montague had a conflict of interest regarding the dividend payment, being chairman of both Thames and its holding company (Kemble).

==== Potential special administration regime (SAR) ====
In January 2025, the government made approaches to restructuring advisers, including Teneo, Interpath and EY, about becoming 'special administrators' for Thames Water if it fell into bankruptcy (a special administration regime, SAR, would put Thames into temporary government ownership while ensuring continued delivery of water services). On 24 January 2025, in light of the SAR discussions, the rating agency Moody's downgraded Thames' debt rating, changing its outlook from stable to negative. It said Thames's proposed financial plans did not "provide an attractive risk-return balance for existing or new investors". Some potential buyers of the company were reported to be demanding temporary renationalisation (SAR) to replace senior management and cut the £19 billion debts, potentially leaving Thames' creditors facing steep losses.

In February 2025, Thames Water sought court approval for its emergency £3 billion funding injection. The five-day court hearing pitched the holders of 'class A' debt backing the £3 billion plan against investors holding 'class B' debt with an alternative plan that they said would be cheaper. Charlie Maynard, the Liberal Democrat MP for Witney, participated in the hearing on behalf of Thames' customers. He argued the emergency debt package could worsen the "Thames Water debt doom loop", with Thames Water gaining less than £500m in usable cash while taking on £1.5bn in emergency debt due to fees and interest costs. While over 100 investors, bankers, lawyers and other advisers attending the case (racking up huge fees - Thames alone was reported to be paying about £15m a month for the restructuring), the judge criticised Ofwat and the UK Government for not being represented at the hearing.

On 18 February 2025, the judge granted Thames Water approval for an emergency debt package worth up to £3 billion. Maynard and representatives of the class B group announced they planned to seek permission to appeal against the judgement. A three-day hearing was confirmed for 11 March 2025, when Maynard, acting on behalf of over 25 MPs, 34 charities and several individual Thames Water customers, was set to argue the judge had been wrong to sanction the bail-out.

In parallel, The Guardian reported Thames had been pressing Ofwat and the Competition and Markets Authority to slow down investigations to avoid spooking potential investors, and to be lenient on penalties and extra costs. Ofwat warned that taxpayers would suffer if Thames was temporarily nationalised, while Thames' pension trustees warned future pension entitlements for some 12,000 current and former employees could be reduced.

The appeal was dismissed on 17 March 2025, with the Appeal Court ruling in favour of the £3 billion bailout, with creditors giving Thames Water £1.5bn in cash, released monthly, plus up to £1.5bn more to see it through an appeal to increase bills by more than the 35% allowed by Ofwat. Thames Water had warned it would run out of money on 24 March without the deal. Thames Water subsequently (18 March 2025) announced it was assessing equity-raising proposals from six parties. The company also put its appeal regarding the customer bill increase on hold for 18 weeks.

On 31 March 2025, Thames Water named the US private equity group Kohlberg Kravis Roberts (KKR) as its preferred bidder. KKR was expected to acquire a stake in Thames worth £4bn in a deal to be agreed by the end of June, with completion expected in the second half of 2025. In a debate in the House of Lords on 29 April, Lord Sikka expressed concerns over the deal, noting that "KKR's business model is profiteering, high-leverage, low-investment, asset-stripping and high-cash extraction. That will inevitably multiply Thames’s problems". However, on 3 June 2025, KKR pulled out of the deal, increasing the likelihood of a temporary nationalisation (SAR); Thames Water had paid KKR advisers £20 million to cover due diligence costs. Thames Water was reported to be working on an alternative plan with Ofwat and other stakeholders to stabilise its finances.

Simultaneously, Thames Water's largest group of creditors (including Elliott Investment Management, Silver Point Capital, BlackRock and M&G), appointed corporate trouble-shooter Mike McTighe to work on restructuring the company's debts. The creditors, comprising around 100 bondholders who had collectively lent Thames Water about £13bn, subsequently demanded that the company and its management be granted immunity from prosecution for serious environmental crimes as a condition of acquisition. On 19 June 2025, Environment secretary Steve Reed rejected the demands as the government stepped up preparations for temporary nationalisation of the company. On 10 July 2025, Thames Water confirmed that it had rejected a last-minute rescue bid backed by the former Liberal Democrat energy spokesman Rupert Redesdale and investment firm Muinin Holdings, stating that the offer had "little credibility or viability to recapitalise the business", and that it was "progressing discussions on the senior creditors' plan with Ofwat".

On 28 May 2025, the company was fined £122.7 million by Ofwat following two separate regulatory investigations. The regulator fined Thames £104.5 million for breaches relating to its wastewater operation and £18.2 million for breaches relating to dividend payments made in October 2023 and March 2024.

On 17 June 2025, Maynard announced that he and a group of Thames Water's secondary creditors would be taking their case against the company's restructuring to the Supreme Court.

In July 2025, Thames Water reported a loss of £1.65bn for the year to March 2025, while total debt climbed to £16.8bn. CEO Chris Weston said the company would "take at least a decade to turn around".

In August 2025, environment secretary Steve Reed signed off the appointment by DEFRA of FTI Consulting to advise on contingency plans if Thames Water was placed into a special administration regime (SAR). Insiders said the appointment did not signal that Thames Water was about to collapse into insolvency proceedings. Chancellor Rachel Reeves told investors she would like to see a "market-based solution", rather than placing the company into special administration.

In September 2025, a summary business rescue plan from London & Valley Water (L&VW), the consortium of Thames Water largest creditors led by Mike McTighe, showed that customers might deliver fewer projects than required by Ofwat's final determination, and talked of "significant writeoffs by investors across the capital structure" and of firing key senior managers if they were permitted to restructure the business. The document offered to sweeten any rescue proposal by providing approximately £1bn in extra funding but also required a "regulatory reset" with new and less onerous targets on pollution and leakage. The consortium envisaged an exemption from rules on waterway pollution for up to 15 years in return for writing off more of their loans and investing more in Thames Water. The creditors are desperate to avoid SAR, as it could result in steeper debt write-offs.

In October 2025, Thames Water was told by Ofwat to refund £75.2m to customers for poor performance. The Environment Agency also gave England's water companies their worst ever annual ratings for environmental performance following a series of serious pollution incidents in 2024, with Thames given the lowest, one-star rating.

In January 2026, Sky News reported that L&VW, the creditor group holding £13bn out of Thames Water's total debt of £20bn, was close to a rescue deal that would avoid SAR. Over £13bn of existing value would be written off in return for a minimum of 10% of the recapitalised company's equity. However, creditors and regulators still differed over the exact terms of the prospective agreement. In February 2026, Thames Water's creditors agreed to start a process to lend the company a further £823 million, as it continued to work on a long-term plan to secure financial survival.

On 16 June 2026, environment secretary Emma Reynolds wrote to Ofwat, objecting to L&VW's proposed £10bn rescue deal for Thames Water, saying the offer did "not do enough to protect consumers or the environment". Reynolds told the House of Commons she had three particular concerns: "the unfair cost to customers, delays to vital infrastructure investments, and delays to environmental improvements". On the same day, 107 MPs signed an open letter to Ofwat and Reynolds calling for rejection of the Thames creditors' latest deal and imposition of a SAR, increasingly regarded as the most likely outcome. In July 2026, a letter from Iain Coucher, chair of Ofwat, indicated he shared Reynolds' concerns and L&VW began a further revision of its £10bn proposals. Thames Water, on 15 July 2026, warned of "material uncertainty" over its long-term future as it sought to avoid renationalisation, with incoming British prime minister Andy Burnham known to favour public ownership. On 21 July 2026, L&VW offered the UK government a golden share as part of its revised £10 billion proposal. The arrangement would give ministers veto powers over major decisions and hostile takeovers. The proposal also included a ten-year suspension of dividends, unless Thames Water became a publicly listed company, and an expansion of reduced tariffs for lower-income households. L&VW were reported to be planning a major board overhaul if the company avoided nationalisation.

In late August 2026, it was reported that Andy Burnham had shelved nationalisation plans for cost reasons, though ministers insisted the Government was taking "no options off the table". Options included revision of UK insolvency laws to make it easier to bring key utilities under public control.

In October 2026, L&VW proposed an emergency £2.4bn loan to keep Thames Water afloat, as the company risked running out of cash by "the end of 2026 or the start of 2027". In November 2026, Thames Water asked L&VW for more time to repay debt, seeking to extend a deadline to pay off an unspecified portion of its £20bn of debt from 2027 to March 2028. Thames Water then secured £600m to allow it to continue operating until autumn 2027, though the deal demanded agreement on various conditions, including a second restructuring plan. On 10 November 2026, L&VW were reportedly poised to submit a "last and final" offer that included a larger debt writedown, a slightly higher equity offer and a demand for Ofwat to waive some penalties in return for a cash payment.

== Operations ==
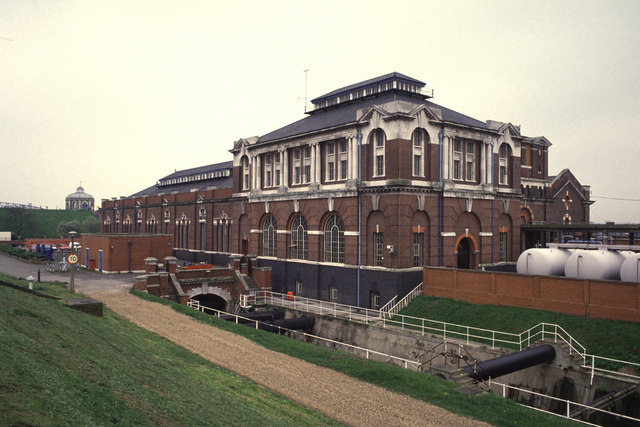
Water pumping station at Walton-on-Thames

As of June 2026, Thames Water listed the external shareholders of Kemble Water Holdings Limited, its ultimate parent company, as: Ontario Municipal Employees Retirement System (31.777%), Universities Superannuation Scheme (19.710%), Infinity Investments SA, a subsidiary of the Abu Dhabi Investment Authority (9.900%), British Columbia Investment Management Corporation (8.706%), Hermes (8.699%), China Investment Corporation (8.688%), Queensland Investment Corporation (5.352%), Aquila GP Inc. (4.996%), and Stichting Pensioenfonds Zorg en Welzijn (2.172%).

As of 2022, Thames Water extracts, treats and supplies 2.5 billion litres (550 million imperial gallons) of drinking water per day using 97 water treatment works, 308 clean water pumping stations and 31,100 km (19,300 mi) of managed water mains to 10.2 million customers (4 million properties) across London and the Thames Valley. It maintains 22 raw water reservoirs and 241 underground service reservoirs. The company supplied 111.4 million litres (24.5 million imperial gallons) of treated water per day to other water suppliers in the region. In 2007 it proposed a reservoir at Abingdon, Oxfordshire, which would have been the largest enclosed or bunded reservoir in the UK.

Thames Water also removes, treats and disposes of 4.6 billion litres (1,000 million imperial gallons) of wastewater per day from 15.5 million customers (6 million properties) using 5,123 sewage pumping stations through 109,292 km (67,911 mi) of managed sewerage mains to 353 sewage treatment works across an area of 13,000 km^{2} (5,000 mi^{2}) of South England. Its Beckton Sewage Treatment Works is one of Europe's largest wastewater treatment works.

On 1 October 2011, it adopted 40,000 km (25,000 mi) - an additional 60% - of private sewers and lateral drains to add to its then stock of 68,000 km (42,000 mi) giving a new network of 108,000 km (67,000 mi). By 2015, this figure had grown to 109,400 km (68,000 mi) of managed sewerage mains.

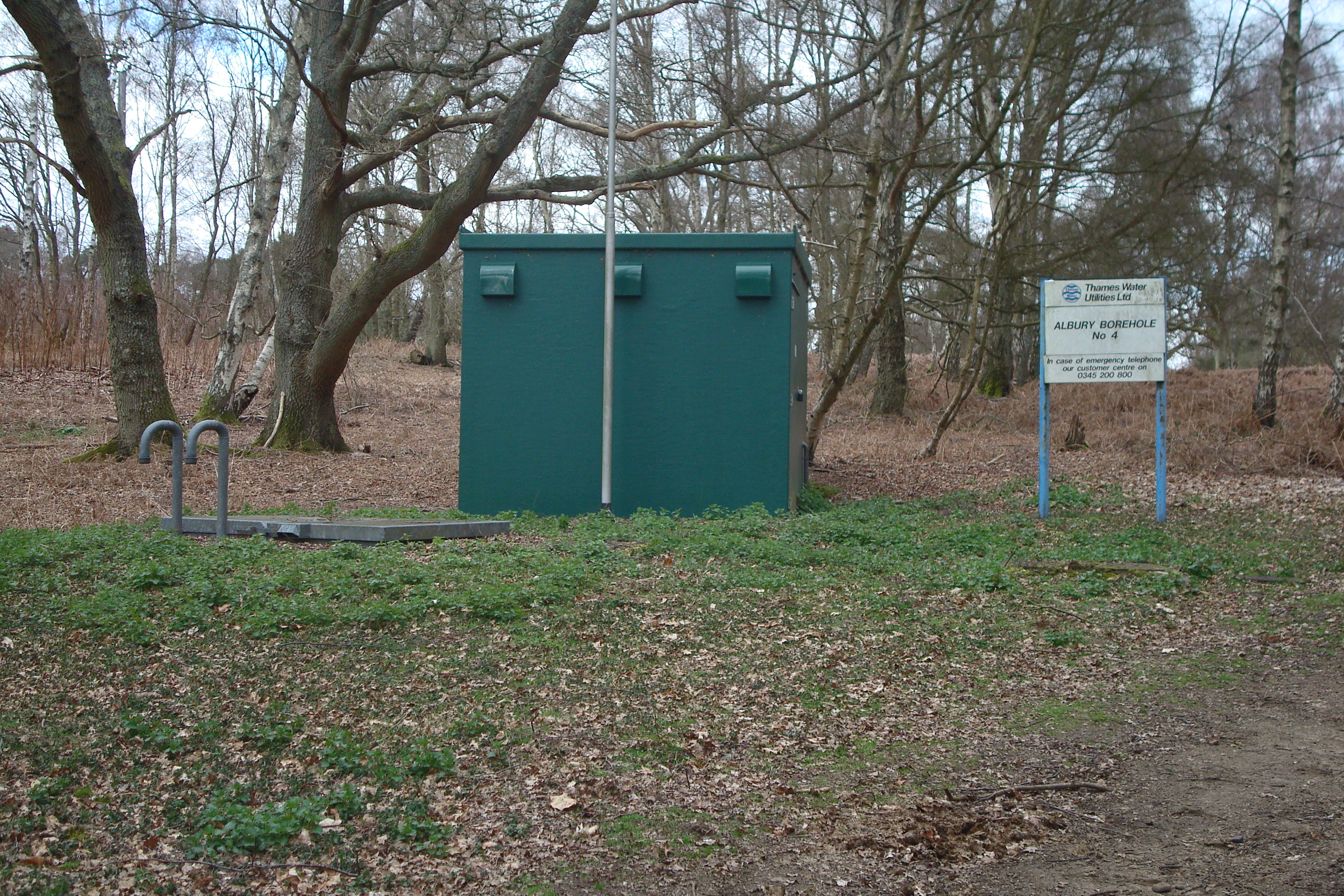
Chalk aquifer borehole under the North Downs at Albury, Surrey

As of 2022, Thames Water generated 510 GWh per year, or 24% of its total heat and electricity requirements, using renewable energy from biogas, sewage sludge, wind, and solar. The company has a target of net zero by 2030.

=== Health and safety ===
In December 2014 Thames Water pleaded guilty to a charge under the Health and Safety at Work etc. Act 1974 after the death at work of one of its workers. It was fined £300,000 with £61,000 prosecution costs. The incident occurred at its Coppermills Water Treatment Works in Walthamstow, London E17 in April 2010 when an excavator reversed over and killed the worker in a slow sand filter. The prosecution followed an investigation by the Health and Safety Executive.

=== Leakage ===
==== 2001–06 (RWE's ownership) ====
Thames Water was repeatedly criticised for the amount of water that leaked from its pipes by the industry regulator Ofwat and was fined for this. In May 2006 the leakage was nearly 900 million litres (200 million imperial gallons) per day and in June that year Thames Water missed its target for leakage reduction for the third year in a row. The Consumer Council for Water, a customers' group, accused Thames Water of continuing to miss its targets for the preceding five years. In July 2006, instead of a fine which would have gone "to the exchequer", the company was required to spend an extra £150 million on repairs.

==== Since 2007 (Kemble's ownership) ====
Thames Water hit its Ofwat-agreed annual leakage-reduction target for each of the ten years running from 2006 to 2016.

In 2006–07, the company stated that it had reduced its daily loss through leaks by 120 million litres (26 million imperial gallons) to an average of 695 million litres (153 million imperial gallons) per day. For 2009–10 the Ofwat-reported daily leakage was 668.9 million litres (147.1 million imperial gallons). In its price control determination for the period 2010 to 2015, Ofwat did not allow the funds needed to finance a significant further reduction in leakage and used the assumption that daily leakage would be 674 million litres (148 million imperial gallons) in 2010–11 and 673 million litres (148 million imperial gallons) from 2011 to 2012. In 2011–12, actual daily leakage was 637×10^{6} L (140×10^{6} imp gal); in 2012–13, 646×10^{6} L (142×10^{6} imp gal); in 2013–14, 644×10^{6} L (142×10^{6} imp gal); in 2014–2015, 654×10^{6} L (144×10^{6} imp gal); in 2015–2016, 642×10^{6} L (141×10^{6} imp gal).

The company achieved these reductions by:

- better pressure management of known problem sectors of its older water network
- replacing 2,736 km (1,700 mi) of worn-out Victorian pipes, mainly under London

These successes in meeting leakage targets mitigated the earlier failures to meet targets. As a result, and in spite of a larger distribution network, Thames Water was leaking slightly less water than at privatisation in 1989, having reduced leakage from its 31,100 km (19,300 mi) network of water pipes by more than a third since its 2004 peak. As of 2013 and with an older network profile, Thames Water leaked 25.8% of supply, slightly less than Severn Trent at 27%. As of 2015 Thames Water leaked 25.1% of supply.

In June 2018 regulators made Thames Water pay £65 million to customers, among other reasons because they failed to repair leaks.

In June 2023, Freedom of Information requests revealed that Thames Water leak levels were at their highest for five years. It was estimated to be losing 630 million litres (140 million imperial gallons) a day.

=== Pollution ===
In the period 2005–13 Thames Water was the most heavily fined water company in the UK for pollution incidents, paying £842,500 for 87 events. In 2016, it paid the largest fine for a single pollution incident of £1 million. In March 2017, Thames Water was fined a record £20.3 million after it pumped nearly 1.5 billion litres of untreated sewage into the River Thames. The company also admitted other water pollution and offences in Buckinghamshire and Oxfordshire. In awarding the fine, Judge Francis Sheridan noted the company's "continual failure to report incidents" and "history of non-compliance", saying: "This is a shocking and disgraceful state of affairs. It should not be cheaper to offend than to take appropriate precautions. I have to make the fine sufficiently large that [Thames Water] get the message", adding that, "One has to get the message across to the shareholders that the environment is to be treasured and protected, and not poisoned.". What was "shocking and disgraceful" was not just the scale of the pollution, but that it was intentional. Sheridan added "the constant use of flow clipping to protect the treatment process, so that, despite the regular and prolonged discharge of untreated sewage to the River Thames via the storm outfalls, all samples taken at the final effluent outfall complied with the permit. This was deliberately done and gave a false impression of the sewage treatment works' performance and undermined the operator's self-monitoring process."

Conversely, in 2014, Thames Water admitted that it had accidentally over-reported the number of properties at high risk of sewage flooding between 2005 and 2010. It agreed to a compensation package for customers of £86 million.

In 2022, a report published by the parliamentary Environmental Audit Select Committee on water quality in the UK's rivers showed that Thames Water's Mogden wastewater treatment works in Isleworth discharged a quantity of sewage which would fill 400 Olympic-sized swimming pools on 3 and 4 October 2020.

In July 2024, Thames Water reported 350 incidents of sewage pollution in 2023, up from 331 in 2022. It said the rise was due to delayed investments to increase capacity across its 400 sewage treatment works. Thames Water had failed to complete a £1.1 billion programme involving around 108 scheduled upgrades promised in 2018 to enable sewage treatment works to meet legal pollution limits. An anti-sewage pollution campaign group accused Thames of a "deliberate act to keep it financially afloat" and called for an investigation by regulators. Thames Water blamed its failure to deliver the schemes on macroeconomic events, including the COVID-19 pandemic and rises in inflation, plus supply chain problems and competing pressures to create more storm tank capacity. In August 2024, Thames Water was fined £104m by Ofwat for failing to manage its wastewater treatment works and networks.

In December 2024, Thames Water reported a 40% increase in pollution incidents, with 359 category one-three pollution incidents in the six months to 30 September, due to a wet spring and summer. The number of hours that Thames Water discharged raw sewage into waterways rose from 196,414 hours in 2023 to almost 300,000 hours in 2024, a 50% increase.

==== Other incidents ====
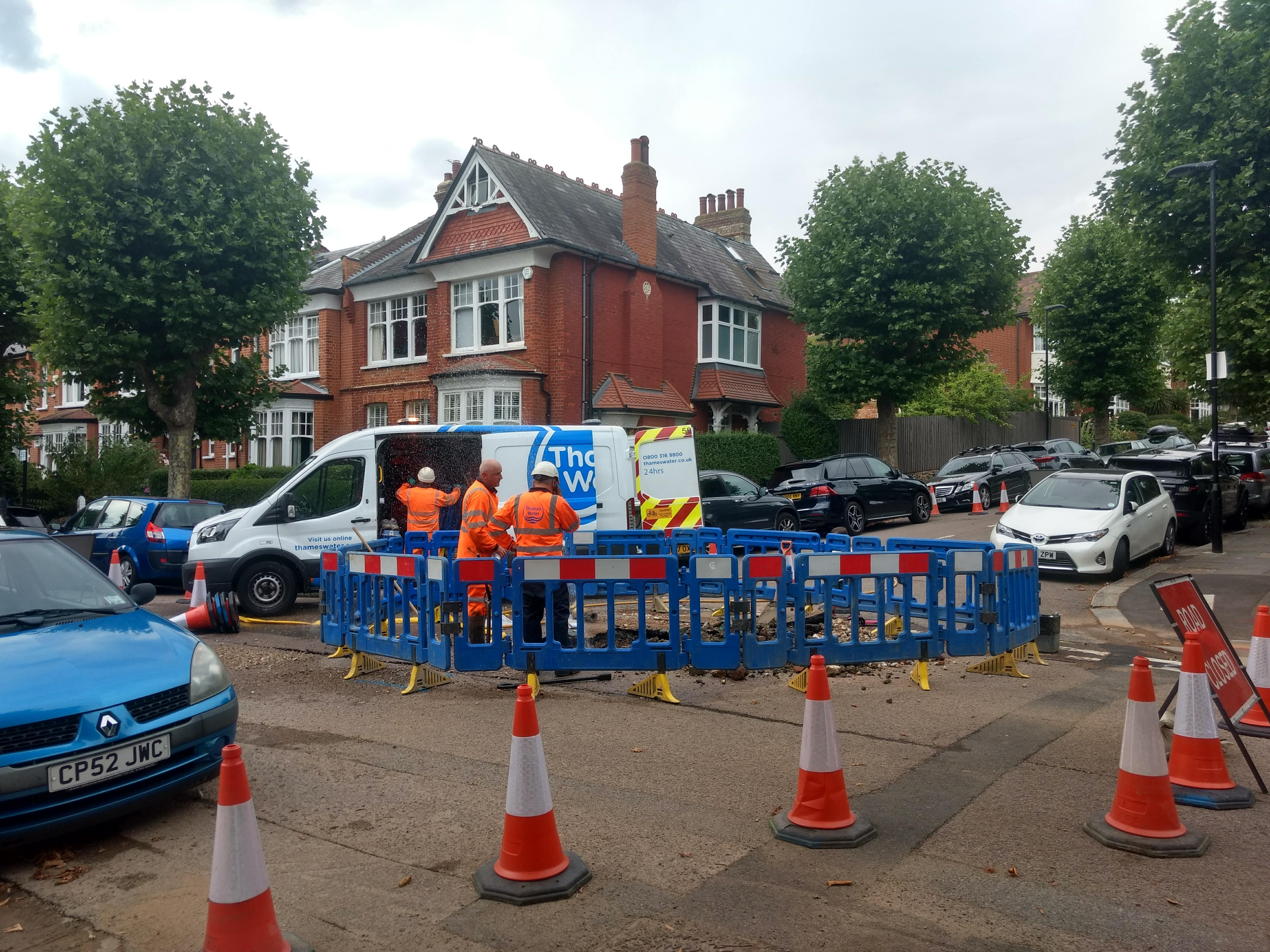
Thames Water at work in Muswell Hill, London

In September 2007, 5 km (3.1 mi) of the River Wandle, Greater London was polluted. In January 2009, Thames Water pleaded guilty at Sutton Magistrates Court, and was subsequently fined £125,000 at Croydon Crown Court and ordered to pay £21,335 in clean-up and investigation costs. In February 2010, on appeal, the fine was found to be "manifestly excessive" and was reduced to £50,000.

Between 5 and 8 June 2011, more than 230,000 cubic metres (8.1 million cubic feet), or 230,000 tonnes, of sewage were released from Mogden Sewage Treatment works, killing 26,000 fish.

Between 14 and 16 August 2011, Thames Water polluted the Faringdon Stream, in Faringdon, Oxfordshire. The company was fined £10,000 and ordered to pay costs of £4,488

On 29 October 2011, Thames Water released thousands of tonnes of raw sewage into the River Crane in Greater London, killing thousands of fish, when a six-tonne valve jammed during routine maintenance. Despite tankering and alternative routing, the volume of sewage from Heathrow overwhelmed the operations. Thames Anglers Conservancy's Robin Vernon said: "It will take a decade to repair all the damage done by the sewage spill. Everything in there is just dead now." In 2013, fungus and slime in the River Crane was attributed to runoff of de-icer from Heathrow getting into the river In 2014, Thames Water blamed recent pollution on fat poured down drains by local customers.

On 9 December 2011, Thames Water was fined £60,000 after releasing sewage sludge into the Foudry Brook killing up to 20,000 fish in a three-mile stretch from Silchester, Hampshire.

In September 2012, clogged-up pumps caused sewage to be released into the Chase Brook, near Newbury. A £250,000 fine imposed in August 2014 was adjudged "lenient" on appeal in 2015. The pumps were replaced by improved pumps.

In January 2016, Thames Water was fined a record £1m for polluting the Grand Union Canal in Hertfordshire between July 2012 and April 2013. In addition, it was required to pay costs of £18,000 and a victim surcharge of £120. In its defence, Thames Water said it had spent £30,000 replacing equipment at Tring.

In December 2018, Thames Water was fined £2m for polluting two brooks near Milton-under-Wychwood in Oxfordshire. On 8 and 9 August 2015, raw sewage was discharged into the water, killing 150 fish. It was also forced to pay legal costs of £79,991.57.

In July 2019, Thames Water was fined £607,000 for polluting the Maidenhead Ditch and the River Cut in Berkshire. In June 2014, raw sewage and treated sewage was discharged into the Maidenhead Ditch. Thames Water has a licence to discharge sewage into the watercourse in storm conditions. However, in June 2014 there were no extreme weather events which would allow the company to discharge untreated sewage. The company also did not meet the conditions which would allow it to discharge treated sewage. Another incident of sewage discharge occurred on 7 August 2014. The company was also ordered to pay costs of £100,000.

In February 2021, Thames Water was fined £2.3m for a pollution incident in 2016 that caused the death of 1,200 fish. Untreated sewage with a high ammonia content was discharged into the Fawley Court ditch and stream that flows into the River Thames at Henley-on-Thames. The incident occurred between 21 and 24 April 2016. The incident was caused by a lack of adequate monitoring in place at the Henley treatment works, as well as faulty equipment. Judge Francis Sheridan stated that the pollution and the preceding events showed 'high negligence' on the part of the company. The company was also ordered to pay costs of £87,944

In May 2021, Thames Water was fined £4m for a number of pollution incidents which took place between 2016 and 2019 in the Kingston upon Thames area. One of these incidents involved the company allowing approximately 79 million litres of untreated sewage to escape from a manhole cover into Green Lane Recreation Ground, New Malden, a nearby woodland, and the Hogsmill River. Equipment at Thames Water's Hogsmill Treatment Works was unable to withstand the effects of Storm Imogen, and the pumps failed. It took fifteen hours for Thames Water to report the incident to the Environment Agency, as it is legally obliged to do. The company was also ordered to pay costs of £84,669.

In July 2023, Thames Water was fined £3.3m after discharging undiluted sewage into two rivers, the Gatwick Stream in Sussex and the River Mole in Surrey, killing more than 1,400 fish in October 2017.

In 2022, according to a BBC investigation, Thames Water illegally discharged sewage hundreds of times on days when it was not raining. While releasing sewage into rivers and seas is permitted in the UK to prevent pipe systems becoming overwhelmed during heavy or prolonged rainfall, discharging sewage on days without rain is known as "dry spilling", illegal under UK environmental law. Without rainwater, discharged sewage is likely to be less diluted, building up toxins and resulting in toxic algae growths that can be fatal to animals and pose a health risk to swimmers. Dry spilling occurred throughout the summer period when the Thames Water region was declared to be in drought, including on 19 July 2022, the hottest day on record when many people and their pets tried to cool off in rivers. A total of 110 dry spills lasting 1,253 hours were recorded, but the actual number of spills might be higher as only 62% of Thames Water overflow points are monitored, compared to 91% for Wessex and 98% for Southern Water.

For over 1,000 hours over six weeks in late 2024 and early 2025, Thames Water pumped raw sewage into the River Ver, a chalk stream in Hertfordshire.

In January 2025, Ofwat was investigating why Thames Water failed to complete over 100 environmental schemes (including upgrades to sewage treatment works and reducing wastewater spillages) funded by customers.

In July 2025, the volunteer-led Oxford Rivers Improvement Campaign (ORIC) published research which estimated that more than half of Thames Water’s 351 sewage treatment works were currently operating without sufficient capacity to treat the volumes of sewage they receive, leading to an increased likelihood of untreated sewage discharges.

=== Water supply shortages ===
On Christmas Day 2016, pumps at Thames Water's Hampton waterworks failed leaving thousands of Londoners in Twickenham, Hounslow and Hampton without water.

Following a series of heatwaves in May, June and July 2026, Thames Water announced a temporary hosepipe ban with effect from 23 July; to help conserve water supplies, Thames' 10.1 million drinking water customers could no longer use hosepipes, sprinklers and power-washers.

On 28 September 2026, a broken Thames Water pipe interrupted water supplies to schools, businesses and homes across five south London boroughs and two Surrey boroughs, leaving 6,000 properties with no water supply or low pressure.

=== Local planning ===
In 2011, the company found itself involved in a controversial redevelopment plan for the Bath Road Reservoir in its home town of Reading. An appeal against Reading Borough Council's rejection of the plan was dismissed by the planning inspector in January 2011. Full planning permission was subsequently granted on 10 December 2012.

Thames Water delays in investing to increase capacity at Oxford's main sewage treatment works were blamed for delaying housing and commercial planning applications in and around Oxford. In September 2024, Thames announced plans to boost the works capacity, trebling its storm tank capacity, increasing treatment flows by 80% and improving power supplies.

In January 2025, The Daily Telegraph published a study commissioned by Thames Water to identify “hidden” and “transient” users of water, which suggested that London is home to as many as 585,000 illegal migrants, the equivalent to one in 12 of the city’s population.

=== Flooding ===
The exceptional rain and weather conditions of 2013–14 caused swollen rivers and several low-lying areas to be submerged under flood water. In February 2014, the River Ash caused flooding in homes in Staines-upon-Thames. This flooding was exacerbated by a two-day delay by Surrey County Council's 'Gold Control' flood control group in ordering Thames Water to close a sluice gate on a Thames Water aqueduct. Thames Water considered it had been following an existing protocol agreed with Surrey County Council and the Environment Agency.

=== Sheep ===
Thames Water maintains commercial flocks of sheep on the borders of several of its reservoirs, which are used as the cheapest way to stop large plants growing and damaging the banks.

=== Drinking fountains ===
From 2018, Thames Water has worked in partnership with Mayor of London, Sir Sadiq Khan, to revive London's Victorian drinking fountain network as a way of encouraging the use refillable water bottles, and cut the consumption of single-use plastics. Thames Water installed 20 fountains in 2018, with plans to install a further 100 fountains between 2018 and 2020, and commitments to clean and maintain the nextwork for at least the next twenty-five years. As of 2023, Thames Water was also installing drinking fountains in the Thames Valley part of its catchment, with the first appearing in Swindon city centre.

The fountain's design - a white base with a large blue waterdrop on top - has faced criticisms for their appearance, with historian and broadcaster Tom Dyckhoff calling them a "great idea. But these are the UGLIEST things ever designed by humans". A 2023 report by water bottle company Ocean Bottle criticised the geographical distribution of water fountains across London, noting there was "wide disparities" across different boroughs.The report found that the highest numbers of fountains were found in Southwark (53), Lambeth (51) and Lewisham (43), compared to there only being one in Barking & Dagenham, and none in Havering.

=== Commemorative manholes ===
As part of its commitments to preserving local history and its own industrial heritage, Thames Water has installed a number of commemorative manhole covers across its catchment, marking significant dates either in the company's own history, or to mark significant landmarks in the local area.

Location	Purpose	Date installed	Source
Whitechapel, London	A commemorative manhole was installed to mark the location where the world's largest fatberg was discovered by Thames Water maintenance staff. The fatberg, discovered in September 2017, weighed approximately 130 tonnes (equivalent to 11 double-decker buses) and stretched 250 meters long.	2018	
Abbey Road, Kilburn, London,	A manhole was installed at the Abbey Road zebra crossing to mark the 50th anniversary of the release of The Beatles' Abbey Road album. The manhole included a depiction of the album cover, with the band crossing the road at the zebra crossing.	2019	
Twickenham Stadium, Twickenham, London	Installed during Pride Month to mark Thames Water's commitment to being an inclusive employer for LGBTQ+ employees. The cover includes the Pride rainbow flag colours, and the inscription "Every Rainbow Needs A Little Water To Shine!"	2023	

== Thames Tideway scheme ==
Over centuries of London's growth from medieval times to the Victorian age, the natural tributary system of the Thames Tideway was converted first into public open sewers and then closed over into covered sewers which emptied directly into the River Thames. Joseph Bazalgette's remediation of the ensuing 1850s Great Stink renewed much of London's sewerage mains infrastructure during the period 1859 to 1865. However, the system could not cope as London's population doubled over the next 150 years. The concreting of large areas of London's green spaces causes substantial rainwater run-off into drainage and sewerage systems. As a result, even small amounts of rainfall could cause the sewerage system to release untreated sewage mixed with rainwater directly into the River Thames. By the early 21st century, there were, on average, 50–60 such incidents a year. In 2013–14, exceptional weather conditions and flooding caused a total release of 55 million cubic metres (1.9 billion cubic feet), or 55 million tonnes. Thames Water therefore advised against swimming in the Thames Tideway.

To mitigate and resolve the above problems, and to avoid water quality fines of up to £1bn by the European Commission on the UK Government, the Thames Tideway Scheme proposed a three-stage series of improvements. The first two stages of the improvements were upgrades to five sewage treatment works and construction of the 6.9 km (4.3 mi) Lee Tunnel, formally opened on 28 January 2016. Together, these were expected to result in an annual discharge reduction of 40%. The third stage, the 25 km (16 mi) Thames Tideway Tunnel was proposed as an effective solution to deal with most of the remaining problem. On 12 September 2014, planning consent was formally approved by the UK Government. On 3 November 2015, Bazalgette Tunnel Ltd received its operating licence from Ofwat, ensuring the start of the project. Thames Tideway became fully operational on 14 February 2025.

== Trinzic ==
Formerly Thames Water Ventures, Trinzic was a project development company set up within the Kemble Group to explore the potential of floating solar farms on Thames Water reservoirs, and the potential of powering district heat networks with heat sources from the sewage treatment process.

Trinzic launched a campaign calling on the UK government to back 30 GW of floating solar installation by 2030, through a mix of policy reform and grant incentives, in November 2023. In May 2024, Trinzic won a Gold Award at the annual Transform Awards in the Best Naming Strategy (rename) category.

Trinzic entered into voluntary administration in July 2024, after Kemble announced it was "urgently" attempting to recover funds from Trinzic with its financial consultants Alvarez and Marsal.

== List of fines and regulatory violations ==
From 2010 to 2025, Thames Water was fined 100 times.

- July 2006, Thames Water was required to spend an extra £150 million on repairs for water leaks.
- December 2014 Thames Water pleaded guilty to a charge under the Health and Safety at Work etc. Act 1974 after the death at work of one of its workers. It was fined £300,000 with £61,000 prosecution costs.
- 2016, fine for a single pollution incident of £1 million.
- 22 March 2017 a record fine of £20.3m was imposed on Thames Water after large leaks of untreated sewage, totalling 1.4bn litres, occurred over a number of years.
- 1 June 2024, Thames Water was set to be fined over £40m by Ofwat for payment of a shareholder dividend in late 2023.
- August 2024, Thames Water was fined £104m by Ofwat for failing to manage its wastewater treatment works and networks.
- May 2025, Thames Water was fined a combined £122.7m by Ofwat for breaching rules on wastewater operations (£104.5m), and breaching rules on shareholder payments (£18.2m). It was the largest penalty Ofwat had ever given.
