= Younicos =

Energy storage systems and control manufacturer

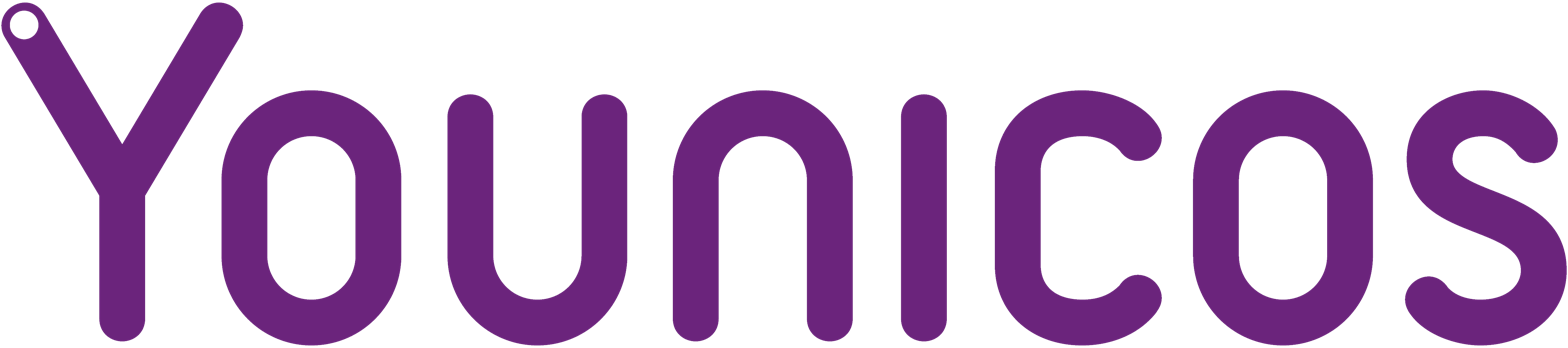
- Let the fossils rest in peace
- Company type: Aktiengesellschaft, Corporation
- Industry: Energy Storage
- Founded: 2005 in Berlin, Germany
- Founder: Alexander Voigt, Clemens Triebel
- Headquarters: Berlin, Germany and Austin, Texas, USA
- Area served: Worldwide
- Key people: Stephen L. Prince (President & CEO); Jayesh Goyal (Chief Commercial Officer); Philippe Poux (Chief Financial Officer)
- Products: Intelligent Energy Storage Solutions
- Owner: Aggreko
- Website: www.aggreko.com

Younicos was a German-American technology company that developed and sold energy storage systems and control software. The company integrated battery technologies, power electronics and control software to create systems that respond to the energy management requirements of power networks of all sizes, including micro-grids.

Younicos had two primary facilities: Younicos AG in Berlin, Germany, and Younicos Inc. in Austin, Texas. It employed a total of about 130 people as of 2017.

== History ==
The company was founded in Berlin, Germany, in 2005 under the name Solon Laboratories by executives of German solar manufacturer Solon. In 2009, Solon Laboratories merged with I-Sol Ventures GmbH and the company was renamed Younicos AG.

In 2009, Younicos began operating a one-megawatt/6-megawatt-hour sodium-sulfur battery testing facility at its Berlin headquarters, which was the first of its size in Europe.

In 2012, the company added a 200-kilowatt lithium-ion battery array and integrated both batteries with a total of 1.2 MW into the German frequency regulation market.

In 2014, Younicos commissioned the largest commercial, and first stand-alone, battery plant in Europe for WEMAG, a German utility company.

In 2015, the company introduced its first hardware product – the Y. Cube. It combines lithium-ion battery blocks with a Younicos-engineered power conversion system (PCS) in a custom enclosure, controlled by Younicos energy storage software. The firm also raised $50 million in growth capital from a group that includes First Solar, Inc. and Grupo ECOS.

As of end-2016, Younicos had contracted for or installed a total of 200 MW of energy storage systems, with 75 MW booked in 2016. Compared to 2015, that represented a 400% increase in annual bookings.

In July 2017, Younicos was acquired by Aggreko and is now a wholly owned subsidiary of the Scottish company.

In October 2018, Aggreko completed the integration of Younicos into its newly formed Microgrid and Storage Solutions business unit. The name "Younicos" is no longer in use.

== Products ==
Y.Cube

Y.Cube is a ready-to-install storage system with all components inside a single enclosure. This off the-shelf solution comprises batteries, inverter, HVAC and auxiliary components, tested and pre-assembled by Younicos.

Y.Station

Y.Station is designed specifically to meet large-scale energy storage requirements. The pre-designed, pre-engineered solution allows for efficient project planning and faster deployment.

Y.Q

The Younicos Y.Q operating system is an integrated control platform at the core of every Younicos energy storage system.

== Select Storage Projects ==
Centrica (UK)

Younicos has been selected by Centrica to design and deliver one of the world's largest battery-based energy storage systems. To be completed by winter 2018, the 49 megawatt (MW) lithium-ion system will respond to fluctuations in electrical demand in less than a second, to maintain electric power frequency and stability.

It is located on the site of a former coal-fired power station in Roosecote, Cumbria

WEMAG II (Germany)

Younicos, in partnership with German utility WEMAG, built a 5 MW/5 MWh battery power plant in the Schwerin district of Lankow, Germany. In late 2016, WEMAG decided to enlarge their Battery Park to double its power output from 5 MW to 10 MW, with the energy capacity increasing from 5 MWh to 15 MWh.

Notrees (Texas)

U.S. utility Duke Energy is using Younicos controls technology to manage operations for a 36 MW energy storage system at the site of Duke's 153 MW wind farm in Notrees, Texas. The Notrees Battery Energy Storage System (BESS), funded in part by a U.S. Department of Energy Smart Grid award, was constructed by Duke Energy in 2012, and is the largest wind-integrated storage resource in North America. In 2016-17, the Notrees BESS is being repowered with more advanced lithium-ion batteries.

Graciosa (Azores)

Younicos Y.Q software platform is at its full grid-forming potential on the island of Graciosa in the Azores, where it provides real-time power management and energy dispatch for the entire island's grid. The system allows the island to be powered entirely by wind and solar, with the existing diesel generators used only as backup power during prolonged periods of unfavorable weather.

== Xtreme Power ==
In April 2014, Younicos acquired the assets of the former Xtreme Power, a Kyle, Texas-based battery systems developer, after it had filed for Chapter 11 bankruptcy protection in January of that year.

Xtreme Power was founded in 2004 in Austin, Texas. In 2009, it installed its first megawatt-scale storage system in Maui, Hawaii. Working with Duke Energy, in 2012 Xtreme Power commissioned the largest wind-integrated battery storage system (36 MW / 24 MWh) in the U.S. in Notrees, Texas.
