= Alistair Phillips-Davies =

British businessman (born 1967)

Alistair Phillips-Davies, CBE (born 22 July 1967) is a British businessman. He has been the chief executive officer (CEO) of SSE plc, a FTSE 100 electric utility company, since July 2013, succeeding Ian Marchant. However, Alistair is no longer the CEO of SSE Energy Services, which was previously owned by the SSE plc Group, but was purchased by OVO Energy in January 2020.

== Early life ==
He was born in Wiltshire. He went to the Allestree Woodlands School, a comprehensive school in Allestree, in the north-west of Derby. He has a bachelor's degree in Natural Sciences from St Catharine's College, Cambridge, where he was captain of the darts team.

== Career ==
=== SSE ===
He became deputy chief executive of SSE in September 2012, and chief executive in July 2013. In 2014 he was paid £755,000 in salary. In 2016 his pay was £844,000 along with a £910,000 bonus, a £644,000 long-term incentive payout and £25,000 and £502,000 in benefits.

In 2017 he received £2.92 million just weeks after an argument over bill caps.

By 2022 his annual compensation had soared to £4.5 million

In the 2024 King's Birthday Honours, he was appointed Commander of the Order of the British Empire (CBE).

Business positions
Preceded by Ian Marchant	Chief Executive of SSE plc July 2013 -	Succeeded by Incumbent
