= Chris Weston (businessman) =

English businessman (born 1964)

- Born: January 1964 (age 62)
- Occupation: Business executive
- Employer: Thames Water
- Title: Chief executive, Thames Water
- Children: 4

Christopher Weston (born 5 January 1964) is an English businessman. He has been chief executive of Thames Water since January 2024.

== Early life ==
Weston was an officer in the Royal Horse Artillery for seven years and did a PhD in quantitative finance at Imperial College London after his time in the Army.

== Career ==
During a civilian career with Centrica, Weston worked his way up to be managing director of its British Gas subsidiary.

He became chief executive of Aggreko, based in Glasgow, in June 2014. It was announced on 19 November 2021 that he was leaving Aggreko.

Thames Water announced that he would become chief executive in December 2023. Weston took up the position on 8 January 2024 and will be paid an annual salary of £850,000 and a performance-related bonus of up to 156 per cent, taking his total package to about £2.25 million.

In December 2024, Weston defended executive bonuses at Thames Water at a time when the firm has £16 billion in debt and is calling for water bill increases to bail out the struggling business.

== Personal life ==
Weston is married with four children.

Business positions
Preceded by Rupert Soames	Chief Executive of Aggreko; January 2015 - November 2021	Succeeded by Blair Illingworth
Preceded by Phil Bentley	Managing Director of British Gas: December 2014	Succeeded by David Kirwan
