= Aggreko =

Supplier of temporary power generation

- Type: Private
- Industry: Temporary power; Temperature control; Energy storage
- Founded: 1962
- Headquarters: Glasgow, United Kingdom
- Key people: Mike Smith (chairman); Blair Illingworth (CEO)
- Revenue: ▲$3,416 million (2025)
- Operating income: ▲$694 million (2025)
- Net income: ▼$(163) million (2025)
- Total assets: ▲$7,583 million (2025)
- Total equity: ▼$101 million (2025)
- Number of employees: 8,200 (2025)
- Website: www.aggreko.com

Aggreko is a global supplier of mobile and modular power, temperature control equipment and energy services, headquartered in Glasgow, United Kingdom. The business was founded in 1962 and previously listed on the London Stock Exchange from 1997 to 2021. Aggreko was acquired by TDR Capital and I Squared Capital in August 2021.

== History ==
Aggreko was founded in The Netherlands by Luc Koopmans in 1962. It moved to Scotland in 1973. In 1984, it was acquired by Christian Salvesen plc, a Scottish transport and logistics company.

In 1997, the business demerged from Christian Salvesen and then listed on the London Stock Exchange.

In December 2001, its chief executive Chris Masters departed the business. He was succeeded by Phil Harrower who had worked his way up in the company from a junior salesman. Harrower was killed in a train collision in the USA where he was based in December 2002.

In 2003, it appointed Rupert Soames as its new chief executive who served for 11 years until 2014.

Aggreko acquired all the activities, other than those relating to large gas turbines, of General Electric Energy Rentals for around $212m in December 2006.

In March 2012, Aggreko acquired 100% of the operations of Poit Energia, a supplier of power generation equipment in Latin America.

In 2014, the company announced the departure of its chief executive Rupert Soames. He was replaced by Chris Weston, who took up the position in early 2015.

In July 2017, Aggreko announced the £40 million acquisition of battery storage company, Younicos. The acquisition was part of the company's plans to provide greener sources of electricity, transitioning away from diesel only generators.

In 2018, it announced a £33 million innovation programme to develop its next generation of power products.

In April 2021, the company agreed to be acquired by Albion Acquisitions Limited, owned by TDR Capital and I Squared Capital, in a transaction valued at £2.3 billion. This marked the business's delisting on the London Stock Exchange.

In November 2021, the company appointed Blair Illingworth as its chief executive.

In September 2022, Aggreko launched a new business unit in North America called Aggreko Energy Transition Solutions, which will develop, own and operate clean energy and sustainable infrastructure.

In March 2026, Bloomberg reported that Aggreko's private equity owners were preparing for a $15 billion initial public offering in the United States.

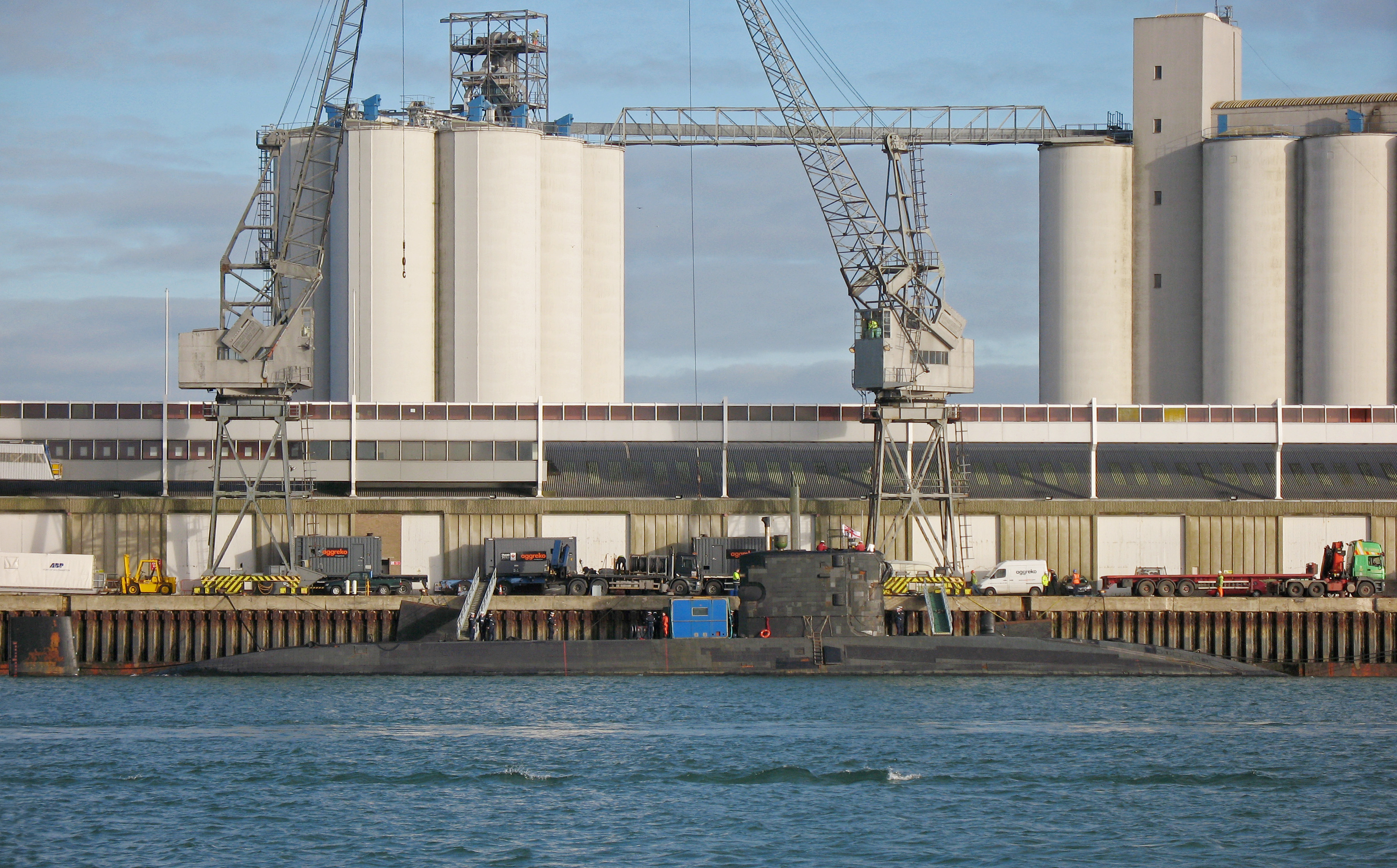
Aggreko trucks shoreside and Aggreko genset aboard nuclear submarine HMS Trafalgar at the NATO nuclear Z Berth in Southampton Docks, December 2008.

== Operations ==
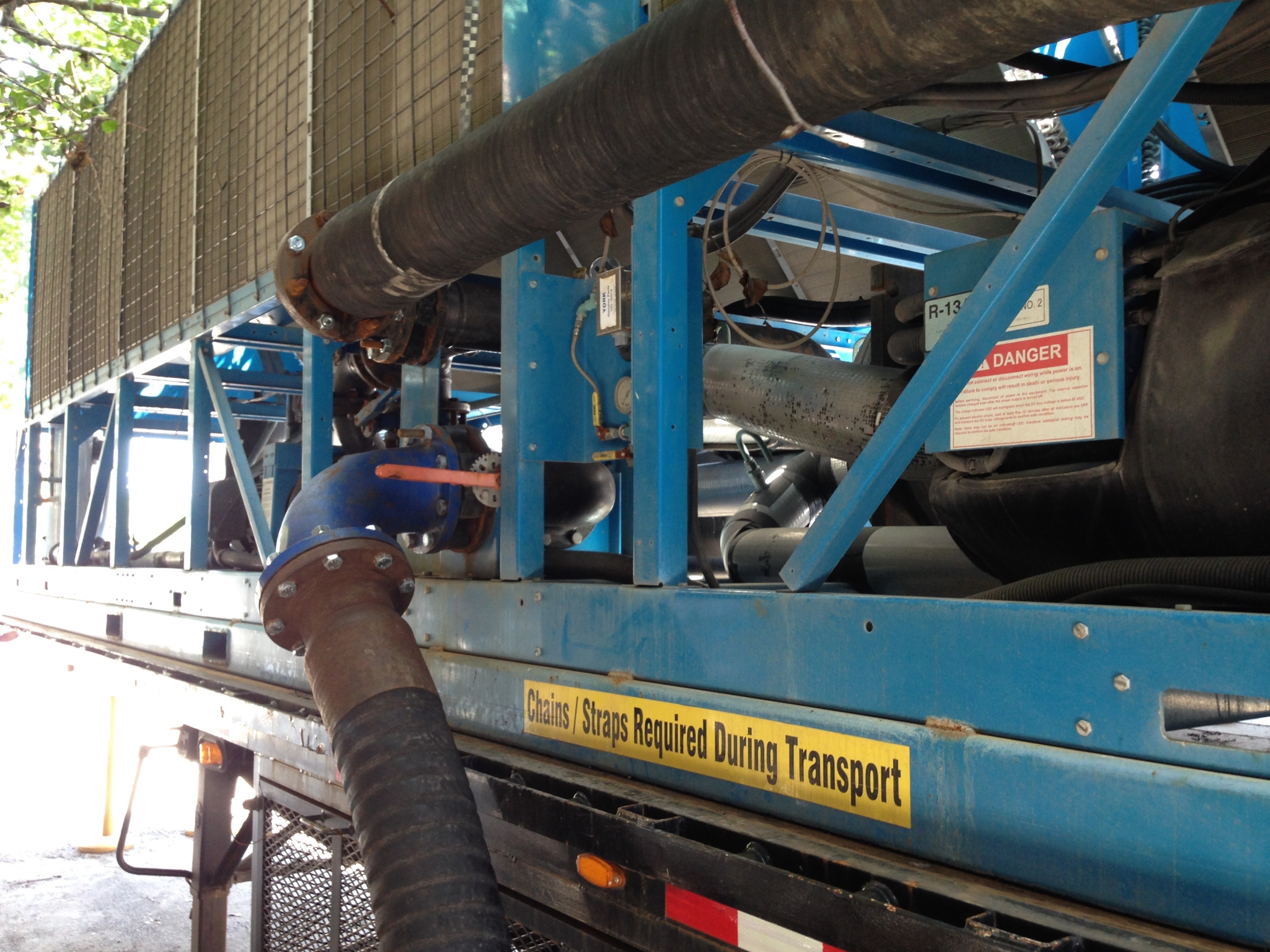
Aggreko rental chiller (2015)

Aggreko is the world's largest temporary power company. It has more than 10 gigawatts of power across its fleet globally. The company employs over 8,200 people and operates across the world in more than 200 locations in 80 countries and has offices in every continent.

The business supplies short-term temporary power to a range of customers predominately across developed countries and longer-term power projects predominantly in emerging markets.

Aggreko supplies to businesses, large events, music festivals, sporting events, industrial sites, and mines. The items hired out include gas and diesel generators, load banks, heaters, air conditioners and chillers. Aggreko offers several greener and cleaner HVO and solar powered generators and hybrid batteries that emit less emissions.

Aggreko has supplied power to sporting events including the Ryder Cup, the FIFA World Cup, Formula E motor racing and SailGP. In 2008, it became the sole supplier of temporary power and temperature controls for the Beijing 2008 Olympic Games in China. In 2010, the firm provided the power for the FIFA World Cup in South Africa. In August 2012, it was the sole supplier for temporary power for the London 2012 Olympic Games. It was also the provider of temporary power for the Glasgow 2014 Commonwealth Games. It supplied air conditioning and power for the 2017 WNBA Finals. In 2024, Aggreko became an Official Provider of Formula 1.

In 2021, the company supplied temporary power to the Olympic Games in Tokyo, Japan, providing power to over 40 competition venues, the international broadcast centre and the athletes’ village in a contract worth £230 million.

In 2022, the company supplied temporary power to the COP26 Conference in Glasgow, Scotland, and the Commonwealth Games in Birmingham, UK. The company also signed up to the Commonwealth Games Social Charter and appointed a social value head to organise their community outreach programme in the Birmingham area.

As well as sporting events, Aggreko supplies power to support the National Grid in Burkina Faso, 26 villages in the Amazon and 20,000 solar panels at the Granny Smith Goldmine in the Australian outback.

Aggreko's chief executive is Blair Illingworth. Its Board is chaired by Mike Smith.
