= Adrian Montague =

British solicitor and businessman (born 1948)

Sir Adrian Montague
- Born: Adrian Alastair Montague; February 1948 (age 78)
- Education: Trinity Hall, Cambridge
- Occupations: Solicitor and businessman
- Spouses: Pamela Evans; Penelope Webb; Innes Daubeney
- Children: 4

Sir Adrian Alastair Montague CBE (born February 1948) is a British solicitor and businessman. He has been the chair of Thames Water since July 2023. He was chairman of the insurance company Aviva from April 2015 to May 2020.

== Early life ==
Montague was born in February 1948. He earned a master of arts degree from Trinity Hall, Cambridge.

== Career ==
Montague began his career as a solicitor for Linklaters & Paines, where he worked from 1971 to 1994. He worked for the investment bank Dresdner Kleinwort from 1994 to 1997. In 1997, he joined the public sector to serve as the chief executive of the Private Finance Initiative Task Force at HM Treasury until 2000, and deputy chairman of Partnerships UK from 2000 to 2001.

He was the chairman of British Energy from 2002 to 2009.

In 2008, when Montague was chairman of the insurance company Friends Provident, he turned down an offer from the private equity firm J.C. Flowers to take over the company for 150p a share, only to see Clive Cowdery's Resolution buy it 12 months later for a mere 79p a share.

Montague was the chairman of Aviva from April 2015, succeeding John McFarlane, stepping down in May 2020.

In June 2023, Montague was appointed as chair of the Board at Thames Water and its parent company Kemble Water. His appointment came amid scrutiny on the financial stability of the water company. In February 2024, Montague resigned as chair from Kemble Water but retained his position at Thames Water.

In a May 2025 appearance before the Environment, Food and Rural Affairs Select Committee, Montague claimed that Thames Water's lenders had 'insisted' on the payment of retention bonuses to the company's senior management. Montague later admitted in a letter sent to the committee following his appearance that he "may have misspoken" when he claimed that "creditors insisted on the management retention plan".

In a letter sent by Montague on behalf of Thames Water to the Environment, Food and Rural Affairs Select Committee following his appearance before the committee in May 2025, Montague confirmed that Thames Water had paid retention bonuses to senior executives at the company from a £3bn emergency loan provided by the company's creditors to stabilise the company's finances and prevent its collapse.

== Personal life ==
Montague has been married three times. He was married to Pamela Evans from 1970 to 1982; they had a son and two daughters. He was married to Penelope Webb from 1986 to 2009, and they had a son. In 2015, he was married for a third time, to Innes Daubeney.
