= White Horse Reservoir =

- 2023 Illustration by Thames Water of the conceptual design and location for a 150 Mm^{3} reservoir.

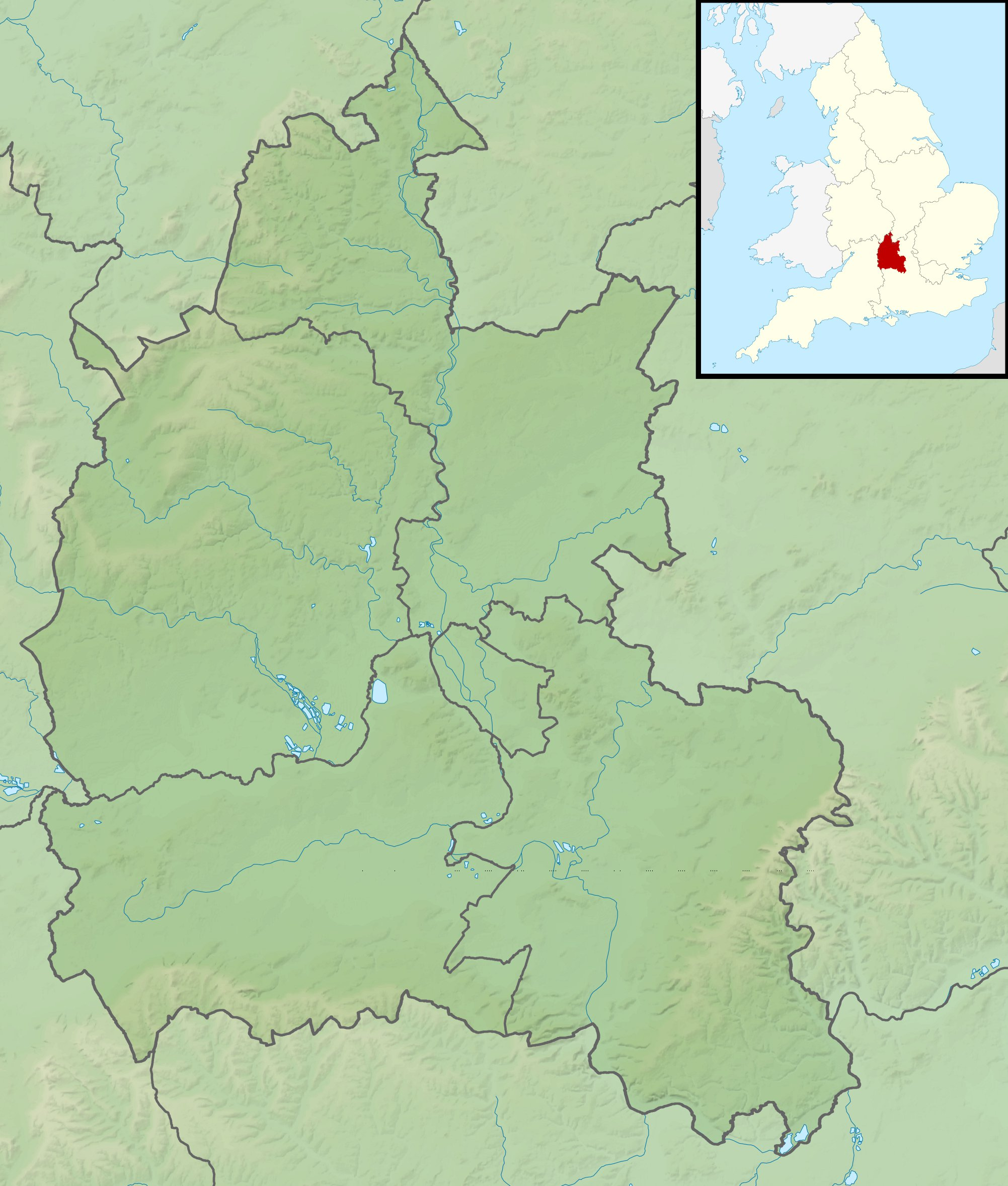
- Location within Oxfordshire
- Location: Oxfordshire
- Coordinates: 51°38′04″N 1°21′15″W
- Lake type: Bunded reservoir (Proposed)
- Primary inflows: River Thames
- Primary outflows: River Thames
- Basin countries: United Kingdom
- Surface area: 6.7 km^{2} (670 ha; 1,700 acres)
- Average depth: 22.4 m (73 ft)
- Water volume: 150 million cubic metres (150 billion litres; 120,000 acre-feet; 0.15 cubic kilometres; 0.036 cubic miles)

The White Horse Reservoir (previously known as the South East Strategic Reservoir Option, or SESRO, and later the Abingdon Reservoir) is a long-term proposal for fresh water storage for the Home Counties. To be located south-west of Abingdon, Oxfordshire, in the mid-west of the Thames Basin, it is intended to help support water supply provision in the south-east of England. The proposals have been developed primarily by Thames Water, along with Southern Water and Affinity Water, as the reservoir is intended to serve all three companies' customers.

== Proposals ==
The proposal arose in 2006 by Thames Water. In 2007 the Environment Agency opined that need for this was not proven. Further arguments were put but the near-term-demand case was rejected in 2011. In 2023, following a period of consultation, a revised version increased the proposal to 150 billion litres (150 million cubic metres; 33 billion imperial gallons).

This would make Abingdon the second-largest reservoir in England by capacity, exceeded only by Kielder Water in Northumberland at 200 billion litres (200 million cubic metres; 44 billion imperial gallons), pushing Rutland Water into third place at 124 billion litres (124 million cubic metres; 27 billion imperial gallons). Across the whole of the UK, only seven Scottish lochs have greater freshwater storage by volume.

Additional storage capacity is expected to be needed by 2043 to cater for projected population growth in the Thames Basin.

In early 2025, Thames Water opened discussions with potential contractors about delivery of the reservoir, which would cost up to £2.2bn to build and would then supply water to 15m people across southeast England. Ground investigations were in progress to help inform an application for development consent in 2026. If the consent was granted, construction was expected to start in 2029 for opening in 2040. Chancellor Rachel Reeves expressed her support for the scheme in a January 2025 speech as part of "nine new reservoirs [...] to improve our water infrastructure and provide a foundation for growth."

A judicial review of the proposed project started on 25 June 2025, but was dismissed in the High Court on 25 July 2025. In January 2026, Thames Water started the process to appoint a main works contractor for the £5.7bn project. In September 2026, Thames Water amended plans for the reservoir - now estimated to cost between £5.5bn and £7.5bn - to accommodate additional building works, relocate adjacent solar farms and reroute local watercourses. On 1 October 2026, Thames Water announced three groups had been shortlisted to construct the reservoir: a Balfour Beatty/Vinci joint venture, WFH (comprising Webuild, Hyundai Engineering and Construction and FCC Construccion), and BMV+ (comprising Bouygues, J Murphy & Sons and VolkerFitzpatrick). Bids were to be submitted in spring 2027, with the contract to be awarded in autumn 2027. Thames Water submitted its application for a development consent order for the reservoir in November 2026.

== Reasons for the construction ==
The main reason to build is that the South-East is facing significant seasonal water stress. Factors are the rain shadow behind the prevailing westerly winds and western hills. Eastern counties lack the rainfall of the west; their average annual rainfall being 500–750 mm (20–30 in). The west receives around 1,800–2,800 mm (71–110 in). Average population density is higher in the eastern than western counties; London houses 13.5% of the UK's population.

== Opposition ==
GARD, or the 'Group Against Reservoir Development', have argued against the reservoir citing the damage to the local ecosystem and the availability of more sustainable alternative measures such as water recycling and leakage reduction. GARD have stated that these would be more effective during long droughts.
