= List of baronetcies in the Baronetage of the United Kingdom: W =

Peerages and baronetcies of Britain and Ireland
Extant	All
Dukes	Dukedoms
Marquesses	Marquessates
Earls	Earldoms
Viscounts	Viscountcies
Barons	Baronies
Baronets	Baronetcies
En, Ire, NS, GB, UK (extinct)

This is a list of baronetcies in the Baronetage of the United Kingdom. They have been created since 1801 when they replaced the baronetages in the Baronetage of Great Britain, and Baronetage of Ireland. This list is not currently complete.

Title	Date of creation	Surname	Current status	Notes
Waechter of Ramanest	1911	Waechter	extinct 1985	
Wakefield of Kendal	1962	Wakefield	extant	
Wakefield of Saltwood	1917	Wakefield	extinct 1941	Lord Mayor of London; first Baronet created Viscount Wakefield in 1934
Wakeley of Liss	1952	Wakeley	extant	
Wakeman of Perdiswell and Hinton Hall	1828	Wakeman	extinct 2008	
Waley-Cohen of Honeymead	1961	Waley-Cohen	extant	Lord Mayor of London
Walker-Smith of Broxbourne	1960	Walker-Smith	extant	
Walker, later Forestier-Walker of Castleton	1835	Walker, Forestier-Walker	extant	
Walker of Gateacre Grange and Osmaston Manor	1886	Walker, Walker-Okeover	extant	
Walker of Oakley House	1856	Walker	extant	unproven (fourth Baronet died 2005) - under review
Walker of Pembroke House	1906	Walker	extant	unproven (fourth Baronet died 2004) - under review
Walker of Sand Hutton and Beachampton	1868	Walker	extant	
Wallace of Hertford House	1871	Wallace	extinct 1890	
Wallace of Studham	1937	Wallace	extinct 1944	
Wallace of Terreglestown	1922	Wallace	extinct 1940	
Waller of Goffies Park	1815	Waller	extinct 1995	
Walrond of Bradfield and Newcourt	1876	Walrond	extinct 1966	second Baronet created Baron Waleran in 1905
Walsh of Ormathwaite and Warfield	1804	Walsh	extinct 1984	
Walsham of Grayswood House	1831	Walsham	extant	
Walton of Rushpool	1910	Walton	extinct 1923	
Ward of Blyth	1929	Ward	extinct 1956	
Ward of Awarna	1911	Ward	extant	
Ward of Wilbraham Place	1914	Ward	extinct 1973	
Warde of Barham Court	1919	Warde	extinct 1937	
Waring of Foots Cray Place	1919	Waring	extinct 1940	first Baronet created Baron Waring in 1922
Waring of St Bartholomew's	1935	Waring	extant	President of the Royal College of Surgeons
Warmington of Pembridge Square	1908	Warmington	extant	
Warner of Brettenham Park	1910	Warner	extant	
Waterlow of Harrow Weald	1930	Waterlow	extant	Lord Mayor of London
Waterlow of Fairseat and Highgate	1873	Waterlow	extant	Lord Mayor of London
Watkin of Rose Hill	1880	Watkin	extinct 1914	
Watson of Earnock	1895	Watson, Inglefield-Watson	extinct 2016	
Watson of London	1866	Watson	extant	President of the Royal College of Physicians
Watson of Newport	1918	Watson	extinct 1959	
Watson of Sulhamstead	1912	Watson	extinct 1983	
Way of Montefiore and Kadlunga Mintaro	1899	Way	extinct 1916	
Webb-Johnson of Stoke-on-Trent	1945	Webb-Johnson	extinct 1958	President of the Royal College of Surgeons; first Baronet created Baron Webb-Johnson in 1948
Webb of Smethwick [|1899
Webb of Llwynarthen	1916	Webb	extinct 1940	only Baronet Sir Henry Webb
Webster of Winterfold and Alverstone	1900	Webster	extinct 1915	first Baronet created Viscount Alverstone in 1913
Wedderburn of Balindean	1803	Wedderburn, Ogilvy-Wedderburn	extant	
Wedgwood of Etruria	1942	Wedgwood	extant	
Weigall of Woodhall Spa	1938	Weigall	extinct 1952	
Welby of Denton Manor	1801	Welby	extant	
Welch of Chard	1957	Welch	extant	Lord Mayor of London
Wells of Felmersham	1944	Wells	extant	
Wells of Hove	1948	Wells	extinct 1966	Lord Mayor of London
Wells of Upper Grosvenor Street and Golder's Hill	1883	Wells	extinct 1906	President of the Royal College of Surgeons
Wernher of Luton Hoo	1905	Wernher	extinct 1973	
Western of Rivenhall	1864	Western	extinct 1917	
Weston of Kendal	1926	Weston	extinct 1926	
Henry Wheatley	1847	Wheatley	extinct 21 March 1852	
Wheeler of Woodhouse	1920	Wheeler	extant	
Wheler of Otterden	1925	Wheler	extinct 1927	
Whitaker of Babworth	1936	Whitaker	extant	
White-Todd of Eaton Place	1913	White-Todd	extinct 1926	
White of Boulge Hall	1937	White	dormant	second Baronet died 1972
White of Cotham House	1904	White	extant	
White of Salle Park	1922	White	extant	
White of Tuxford and Wallingwells	1802	White	extant	
Whitehead of Culham	1889	Whitehead	extant	Lord Mayor of London
Whitmore of Orsett	1954	Whitmore	extant	
Whitworth of The Firs	1869	Whitworth	extinct 1887	
Wigan of Paston Hall	1898	Wigan	dormant	fifth Baronet died 1996
Wiggin of Honnington Hall	1892	Wiggin	extant	
Wigram of Walthamstow House	1805	Wigram	extant	
Wilkinson of Brook	1941	Wilkinson	extant	Lord Mayor of London
Wilks of Grosvenor Street	1898	Wilks	extinct 1911	President of the Royal College of Physicians
Williams of Bridehead	1915	Williams	extant	
Williams of Cilgeraint	1953	Williams	extant	
Williams of Castell Deudrath and Borthwen	1909	Williams	extinct 2012	
Williams of Glynwr	1935	Williams	extinct 1959	
Williams of Kars	1856	Williams	extinct 1883	
Williams of Brook Street	1894	Williams	extinct 1926	
Williams of Park	1928	Williams	extinct 1938	
Williams of Tregullow	1866	Williams	extant	
Williams of Llanelly	1955	Williams	extinct 1958	
Williamson of Glenogle	1909	Williamson	extant	first Baronet created Baron Forres in 1922
Willink of Dingle Bank	1957	Willink	extant	
Wills of Coombe Lodge	1893	Wills	extinct 1911	first Baronet created Baron Winterstoke in 1906
Wills of Blagdon	1923	Wills	extant	
Wills of Hazlewood and Clapton-in-Gordano	1904	Wills	extant	
Wills of Northmoor	1897	Wills	extant	second Baronet created Baron Dulverton in 1929
Willshire of the East Indies	1841	Willshire	extinct 1947	
Wilson-Todd of Halnaby Hall and Tranby Park	1903	Wilson-Todd	extinct 1925	
Wilson of Airdrie	1906	Wilson	extant	
Wilson of Archer House	1897	Wilson	extinct 1907	
Wilson of Carbeth	1920	Wilson	extant	
Wilson of Currygrane	1919	Wilson	extinct 1922	
Wilson of Delhi	1858	Wilson	extinct 1921	
Wilson of Eshton Hall	1874	Wilson	extant	
Wingate of Dunbar	1920	Wingate	extinct 1978	
Wolfson of St Marylebone	1962	Wolfson	extinct 2010	second Baronet created a life peer as Baron Wolfson in 1985
Womersley of Grimsby	1945	Womersley	extant	
Wood of Gatton	1808	Wood	extinct 1837	
Wood of Hatherley House	1837	Wood	extant	
Wood of Hengrave	1918	Wood	extinct 1974	
Wood of The Hermitage	1897	Wood	extinct 1946	
Worley of Ockshott	1928	Worley	extinct 1937	
Worsfold of The Hall Place	1924	Worsfold	extinct 1936	
Worsley-Taylor of Moreton Hall	1917	Worsley-Taylor	extinct 1958	
Worsley of Hovingham Hall	1838	Worsley	extant	
Worthington-Evans of Colchester	1916	Worthington-Evans	extinct 1971	
Wraxall of Wraxall	1813	Wraxall	extant	
Wright of Swansea	1920	Wright	extinct 1950	
Wrightson of Neasham Hall	1900	Wrightson	extant	
Wrixon-Becher of Ballygiblin	1831	Wrixon-Becher	extant	
Wylie of St Petersburg	1814	Wylie	extinct 1845	
