= Walker baronets =

Set index for Walker baronets

There have been six baronetcies created for people with the surname Walker; one is extinct, while five are extant as of 2026.

- Walker baronets of Bushey Hall (1680)
- Walker baronets of Castleton (1835), later Forestier-Walker baronets
- Walker baronets of Oakley House (1856)
- Walker baronets of Sand Hutton (1868)
- Walker baronets of Gateacre Grange and of Osmaston Hall (1886): see Walker-Okeover baronets
- Walker baronets of Pembroke House (1906)

== See also ==
- Leolin Forestier-Walker, 1st Baronet
- Walker-Smith baronets
