= Robert Walsingham =

Robert Walsingham may refer to:

- Robert Walsingham (theologian), 14th-century English theologian and Carmelite friar
- Robert Walsingham (pirate), 17th-century English pirate
- Robert Boyle-Walsingham (1736–1780), also known as Robert Walsingham, English politician, MP for Fowey and Knaresborough

== See also ==
- Walsingham (surname)
