= Bourchier Cleeve =

English pewterer and finance writer (1715–1760)

- Born: 1715
- Died: 1760-03-01; Foots Cray Place
- Spouse: Mary Haydon
- Parents: Alexander Cleeve (father); Ann Bourchier (mother)
- Family: Bourchier

Bourchier Cleeve (1715–1760) was an English pewterer and writer of pamphlets.

== Life ==
A prosperous pewterer in London, he was the son of Alexander Cleeve, a pewterer in Cornhill, who died on 11 April 1738. He was given the freedom of the City of London in 1736, at the age of 21. In 1755 Cleeve paid a fine to be excused from serving the office of sheriff of London.

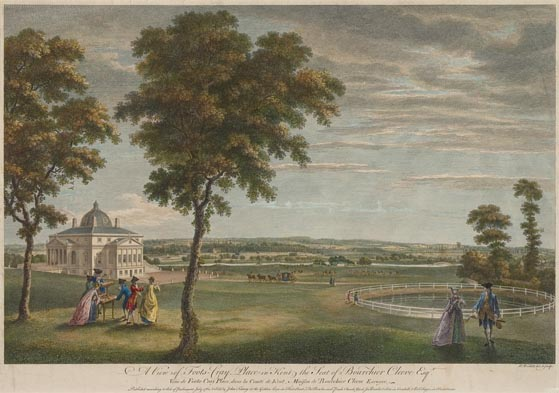
Foots Cray Place, 1760 engraving by William Woollett

Around that date Cleeve acquired an estate in Foots Cray, Kent, once the property of Sir Francis Walsingham. He pulled down the old house, and erected, at some distance north of it, a Palladian mansion of freestone. He enclosed a park round it, with plantations of trees, and an artificial canal. This house was known as Foots Cray Place. It has been attributed to the architect Isaac Ware, on the basis of a 19th-century listing; Howard Colvin regards the attribution as "acceptable" on style ground, but there is no direct evidence. The house was damaged by fire in 1949, and demolished.

Cleeve also acquired much other land in Kent before his death on 1 March 1760.

== Works ==
Cleeve wrote A Scheme for preventing a further Increase of the National Debt, and for reducing the same (1756), inscribed to the Earl of Chesterfield (1756). The scheme was to impose a high tax on houses, and to repeal an equivalent amount of taxes on "commodities". Part of this tract was taken up with estimates of the amount subtracted in taxes from incomes. Cleeve's estimates were exaggerated, as was shown by Joseph Massie's Letter to Bourchier Cleeve, Esq., concerning his Calculations of Taxes (1757). He wrote another pamphlet, on the staffing of the navy.

== Family ==
Cleeve married Mary Haydon in 1740 or 1741. Mary gave birth to three children:

- Richard Haydon Cleeve christened at St Michael, Cornhill 1743-12-14
- Ann Cleeve christened at St Alfege Church, Greenwich 1745-07-17
- Bourchier Cleeve christened at St Michael, Cornhill, 1746-11-26

His will was made in 1759 and only mentions Ann. Bourchier died at Foots Cray Place on 1760-03-01, having last modified his will two days earlier. It's not clear when Mary died, but Ann eventually inherited the estates, which in 1765 came into the possession of Sir George Yonge, 5th Baronet, by his marriage with her.

== Wealth ==
The source of Cleeve's enormous wealth is not at all clear.

He bought the manor of Limpsfield in Surrey on 1750-12-28 for £15800. This included over 1000 acres of farms and 900 acres of woodland. He planned to raise over £15000 profit by felling and selling for timber 6200 oak trees from this land as part of Ann's dowry, which would still have left him with the freeholds and rents.

He bought the estate which was to become Foots Cray Place for £5450 in 1752. He built his grand new house, and after his death the estate was sold for £14500.

He thought that his widow would easily find £5000 to add to his daughter's dowry.

He specified that his art collection was not to be sold for less than £7350.

As well as his main house at Foots Cray Place, he also owned

- the manor of Limpsfield
- a town house he used himself at Spring Garden, Charing Cross
- Land in Farningham, Eynsford, North Cray, Bexley, Chislehurst and Sidcup, Kent
- Property in Cornhill

== Notes ==
Attribution

This article incorporates text from a publication now in the public domain: Stephen, Leslie, ed. (1887). "Cleeve, Bourchier". Dictionary of National Biography. Vol. 11. London: Smith, Elder & Co.
