= Havana Yacht Club =

Yacht club

Havana Yacht Club Club Náutico de La Habana
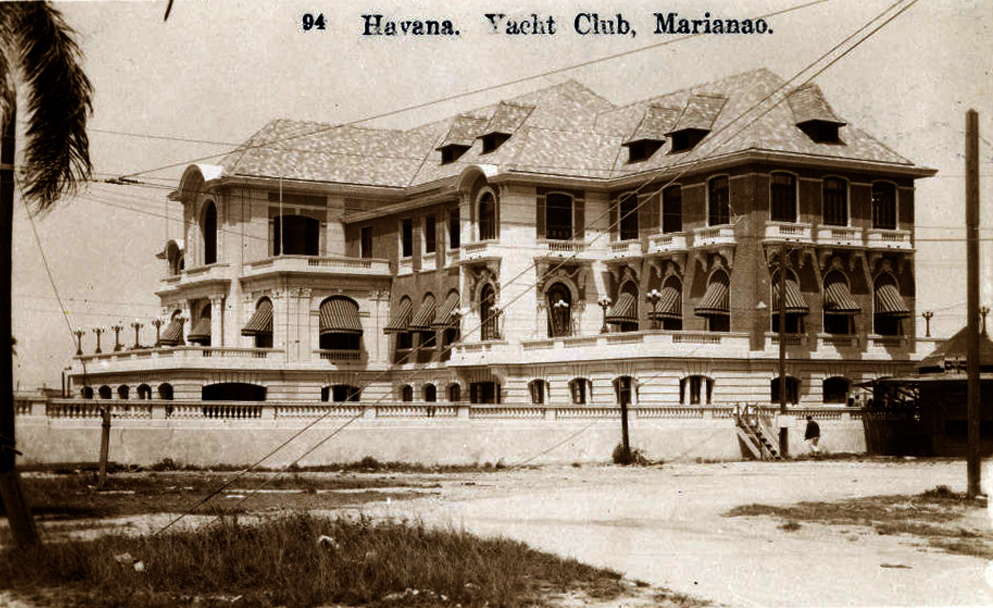
- Interactive map of the Havana Yacht Club; Club Náutico de La Habana area
- Alternative names: HYC

General information
- Location: Marianao, Havana, Cuba
- Coordinates: 23°5′37.72″N 82°27′17.09″W
- Opened: 1885

Havana Yacht Club now Julio Antonio Mella Social Club, (Spanish: Club Social Julio Antonio Mella) was a prominent yacht and social club in Havana, Cuba.

== Early history ==
The Havana Yacht Club was founded and funded by British banker Joseph White-Todd in 1885.

The Havana Yacht Club was located near the coastline of the La Concha Beach in Marianao on the outskirts of Havana, Cuba. The social club organized regattas and other nautical events.

In December 1930, Cuban Secretary Vivancos ordered the club to close, alleging it was one of several hubs for activities and a conspiracy against Gerardo Machado's administration. Among the club's board of directors members during the period were Juan Rivera, general manager of the National City Bank of New York in Havana, Dr. Juan Luis Rodriguez, and Manuel Aspuru, owner of the Toledo sugar mill. All of the board members were charged with conspiring to overthrow the government in January 1931, a claim they all denied. The Cuban state secretary issued an order on January 7, 1931, clearing the board of conspiracy charges and allowing the club to resume its social functions.

Following the 1959 Revolution, it was renamed the Julio Antonio Mella Workers' Social Club (Spanish: Club Social de Trabajadores Julio Antonio Mella), also known as the Circulo Social Julio Antonio Mella, in 1961.
