= Robert Walsingham (theologian) =

Medieval English Scholastic philosopher

Robert Walsingham (died in or after 1313) was a Carmelite scholastic theologian and philosopher.

Walsingham was a student of one William Paganerus at the University of Oxford around 1280 or 1290. In 1303, he supported the English provincial master William Lidlyngton against the decisions of the Carmelite general chapter meeting in Narbonne to divide the English province. He was supposedly already an old man by 1305. He obtained his master's degree sometime thereafter but before 12 February 1312, when he and Henry of Harclay held disputations.

Two quodlibeta by Walsingham are known from a single manuscript. The longer is said to contain 22 questions, although only 19 are present. The other contains six questions. There was once a larger collection, Quodlibeta maiora, cited by John Bale, but it is now lost. The surviving quodlibeta are usually dated to 1312–1313. They "are among the earliest scholastic works where the author cites his contemporaries." Among these "moderns", as he calls them, are Henry Harclay, Godfrey of Fontaines, Peter of Auvergne, Thomas Aquinas, Alexander of Hales, Gerard of Bologna, Henry of Ghent, Giles of Rome, John Duns Scotus, Simon of Faversham, Robert Cowton and Richard of Conington. He had an especially high opinion of Henry of Ghent, whom he calls "the great". Among older authorities, he cites Aristotle, Avicenna and Averroes.

Walsingham was not a very influential thinker. Besides his quodlibeta, only excerpts from his Quaestiones ordinariae and Elucidationes sententiarum Petri Lombardi, a commentary on the Sentences, and preserved in two manuscripts. His Determinationes scripturae and his commentaries on Proverbs and Ecclesiasticus are apparently lost. Nevertheless, he influenced Robert Graystanes and John Baconthorpe calls him "my reverend master". His quodlibeta are cited by Johannes Brammart.

The figure of John Walsingham, first cited by Johannes Trithemius in 1531 and then by many others, results from a conflation of Robert Walsingham with John Baconthorpe and John Walsham. This fictional John was said to have become Carmelite provincial master of England in 1326. The confusion was dismantled by Bartomeu Xiberta in 1931.

== Bibliography ==
- Brown, Stephen F. (2004a). "Walsingham, John". Oxford Dictionary of National Biography (online ed.). Oxford University Press. doi:10.1093/ref:odnb/28626. (Subscription or UK public library membership required.)
- Brown, Stephen F. (2004b). "Walsingham, Robert". Oxford Dictionary of National Biography (online ed.). Oxford University Press. doi:10.1093/ref:odnb/52688. (Subscription or UK public library membership required.)
- Schabel, Christopher (2007). "Carmelite Quodlibeta". In Schabel, Christopher (ed.). Theological Quodlibeta in the Middle Ages: The Fourteenth Century. Brill. pp. 493–543.
- Xiberta, Bartomeu M. (1928). "Robert Walsingham, Carmelità, mestre de teologia d'Oxford a primeries del segle XIV^{e}". Criterion. 4: 147–174, 298–324.
- Xiberta, Bartomeu M. (1931). De scriptoribus scholasticis saeculi XIV ex ordine Carmelitarum. Louvain. pp. 111–113.
