= Foots Cray Meadows =

Park in Bexley, London, England

Coordinates: 51.4258°N 0.1271°E

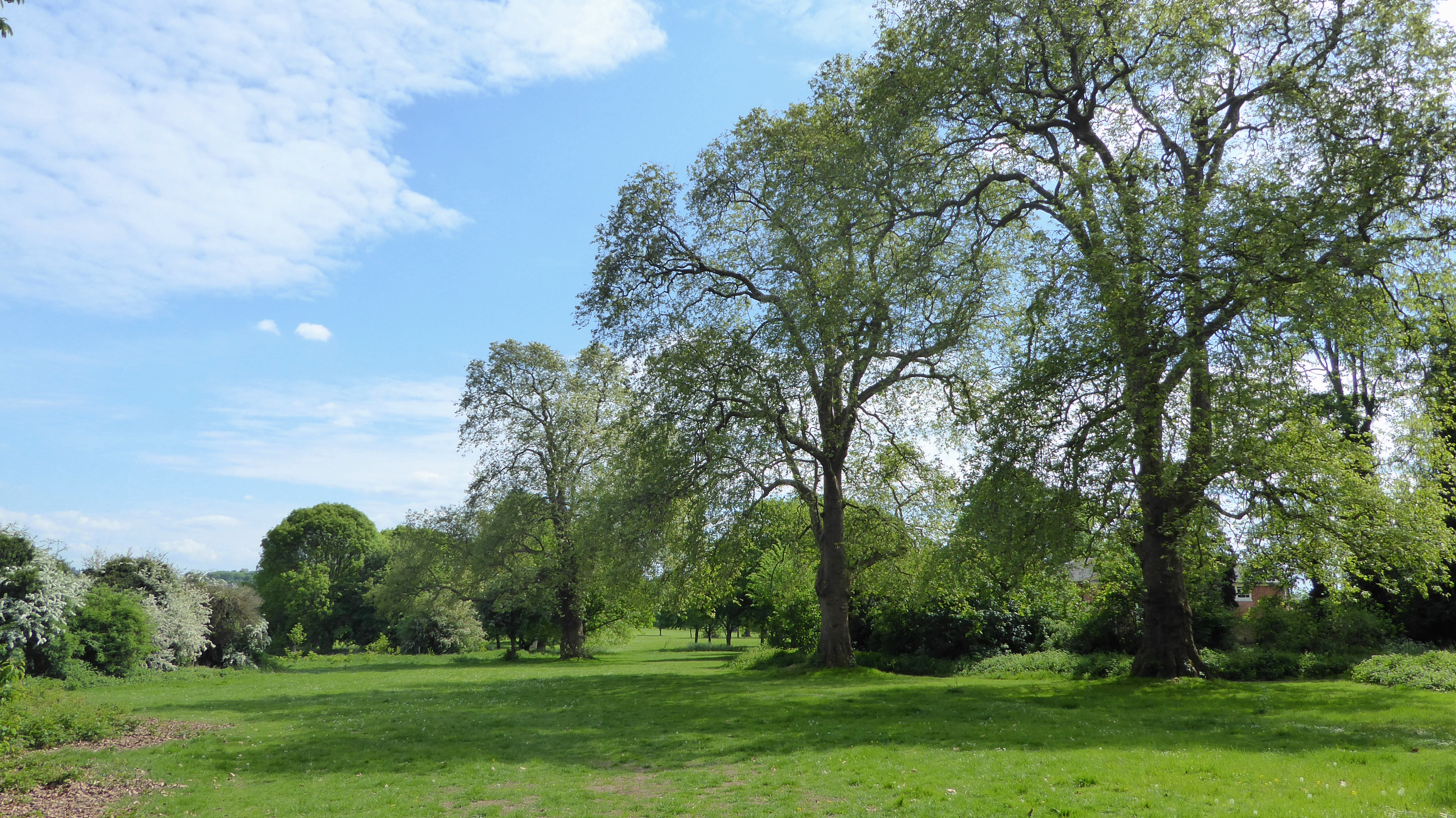
Foots Cray Meadows

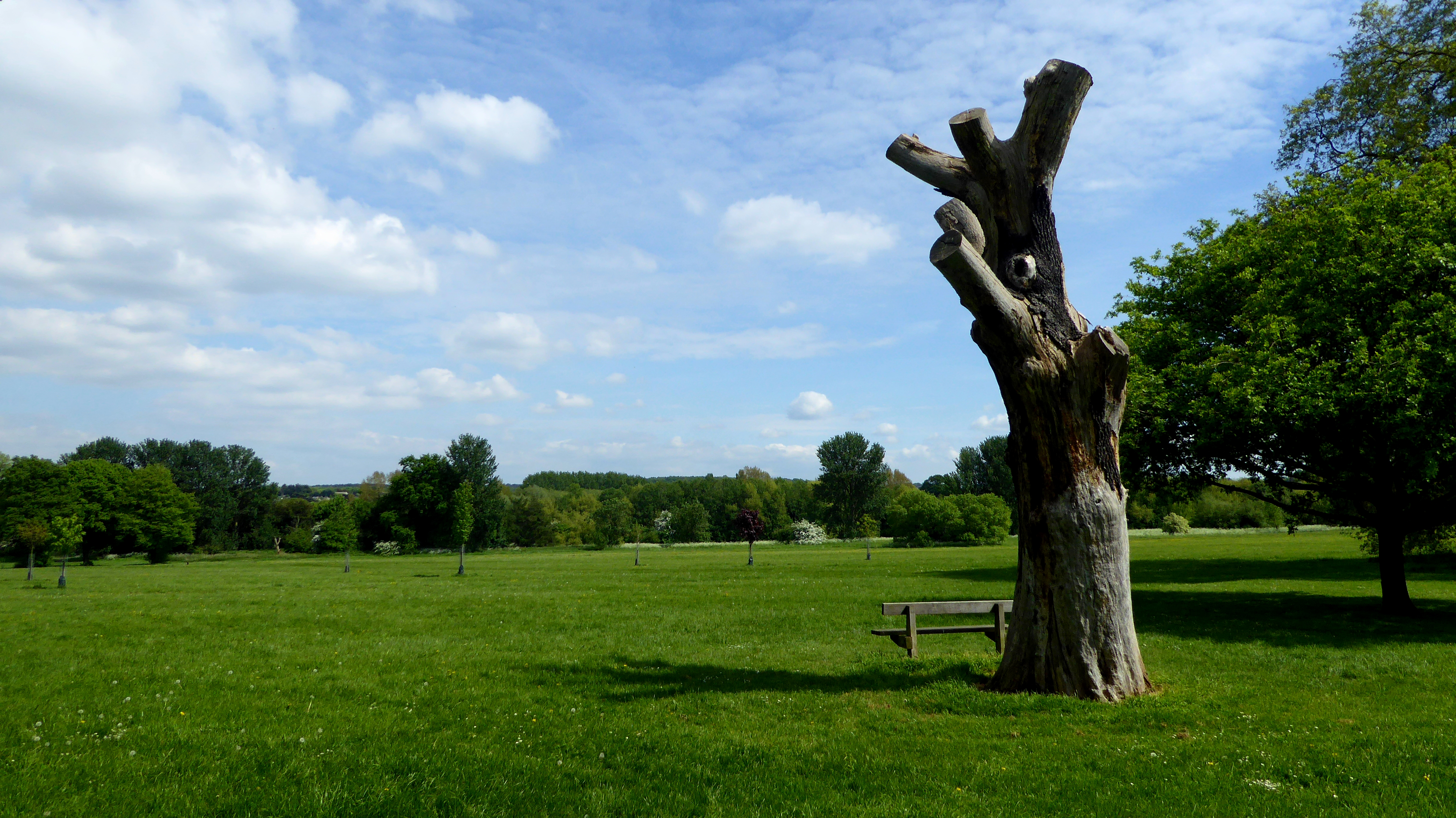
Foots Cray Meadows

Foots Cray Meadows is an area of parkland and woodland 97 hectares (240 acres) in size, within the London Borough of Bexley, England. It borders the suburbs of Albany Park, Sidcup, Foots Cray, North Cray and Ruxley. The River Cray runs through it in a north-easterly direction. The London Loop, a public recreational walking path around London, also known as the "M25 for walkers", runs through the meadows parallel to the river from Sidcup Place, just south of the meadows. Two notable bridges cross the River Cray in the meadows: Five Arches bridge and the smaller Penny Farthing Bridge.

The Meadows are a Local Nature Reserve and a Site of Metropolitan Importance for Nature Conservation. They have also received a Green Flag Award. There is access from Rectory Lane, among other places. Adjacent to the meadows is what was the kitchen garden and stables of the Foots Cray Place estate and which included a boules alley with a summer house which is still standing.

== History ==
The area was originally a part of the Foots Cray Place estate, and during the 18th century the Five Arches bridge was built. At the same time, an almshouse was built adjacent to the woods, which, as of 2008, was being excavated by archaeologists belonging to Bexley Archaeological Group. Bexley Archaeological Group

On 18 October 1949 Foots Cray Place caught fire and the house was destroyed. The ruins were subsequently demolished and the grounds became Foots Cray Meadows, a public park.

In the early 2000s, Five Arches bridge was renovated with new stone, along with the 'Penny Farthing' bridge just upstream.

== Gallery ==
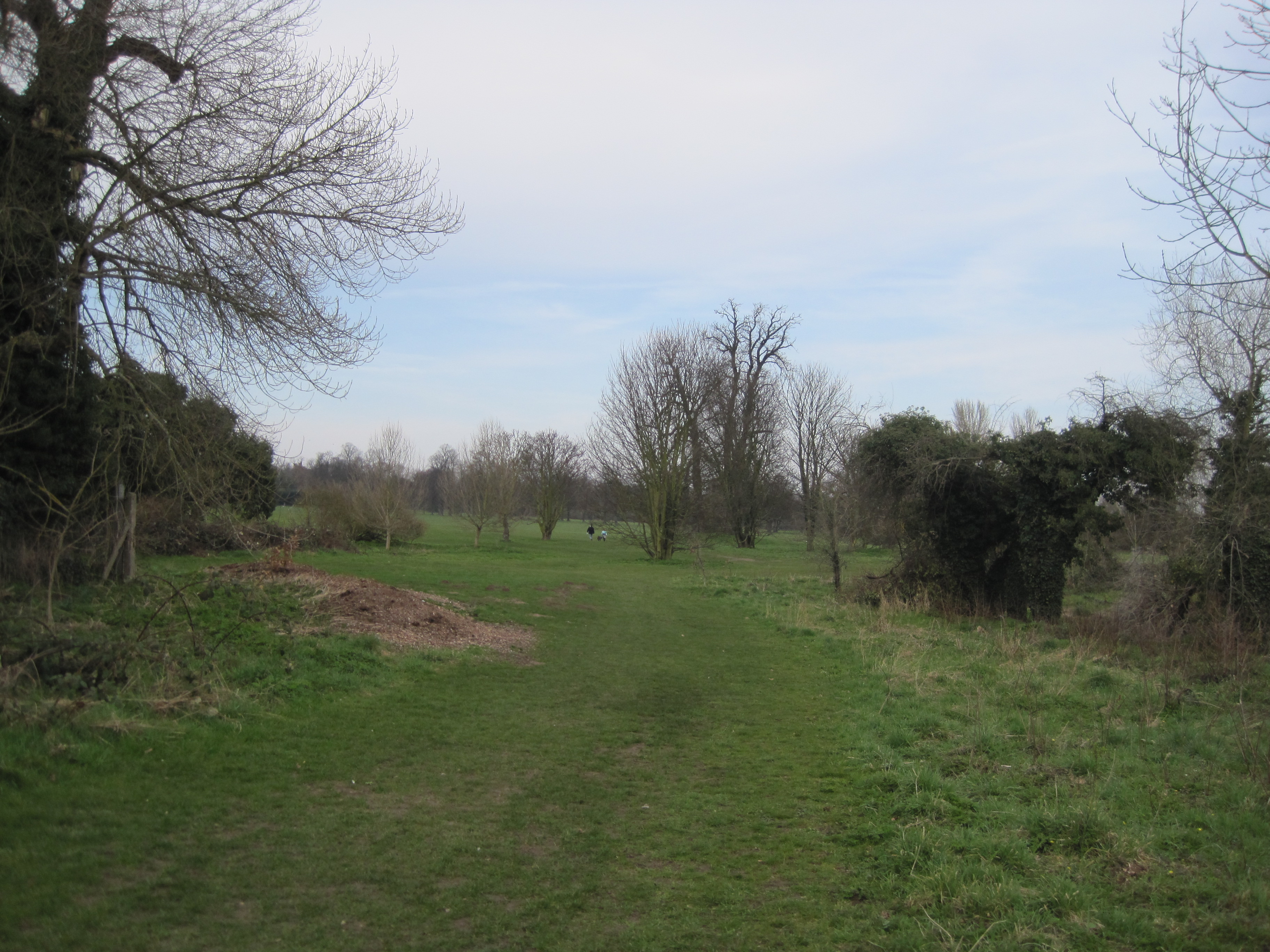
Foots Cray Meadows

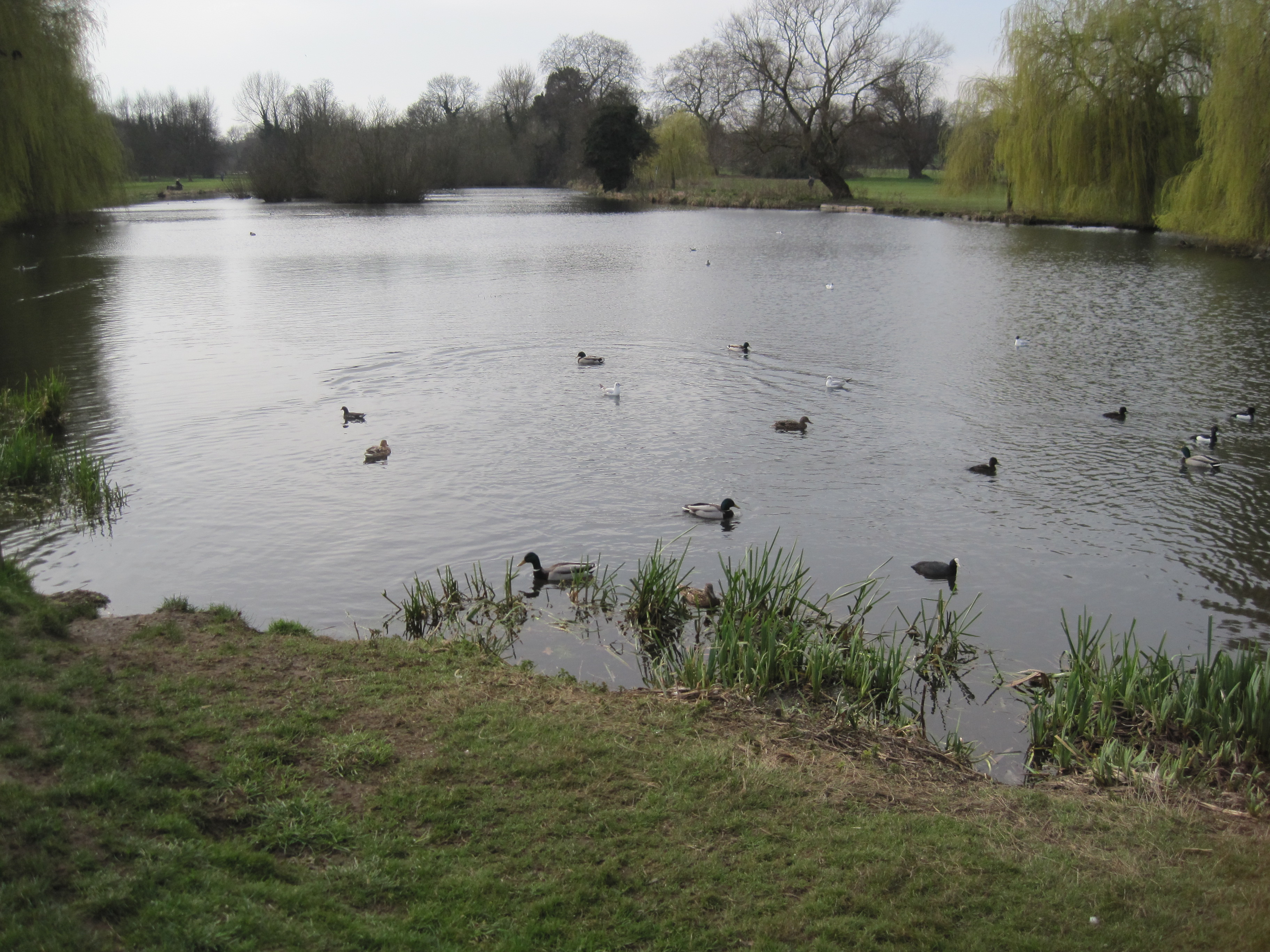
Lake in Foots Cray Meadows

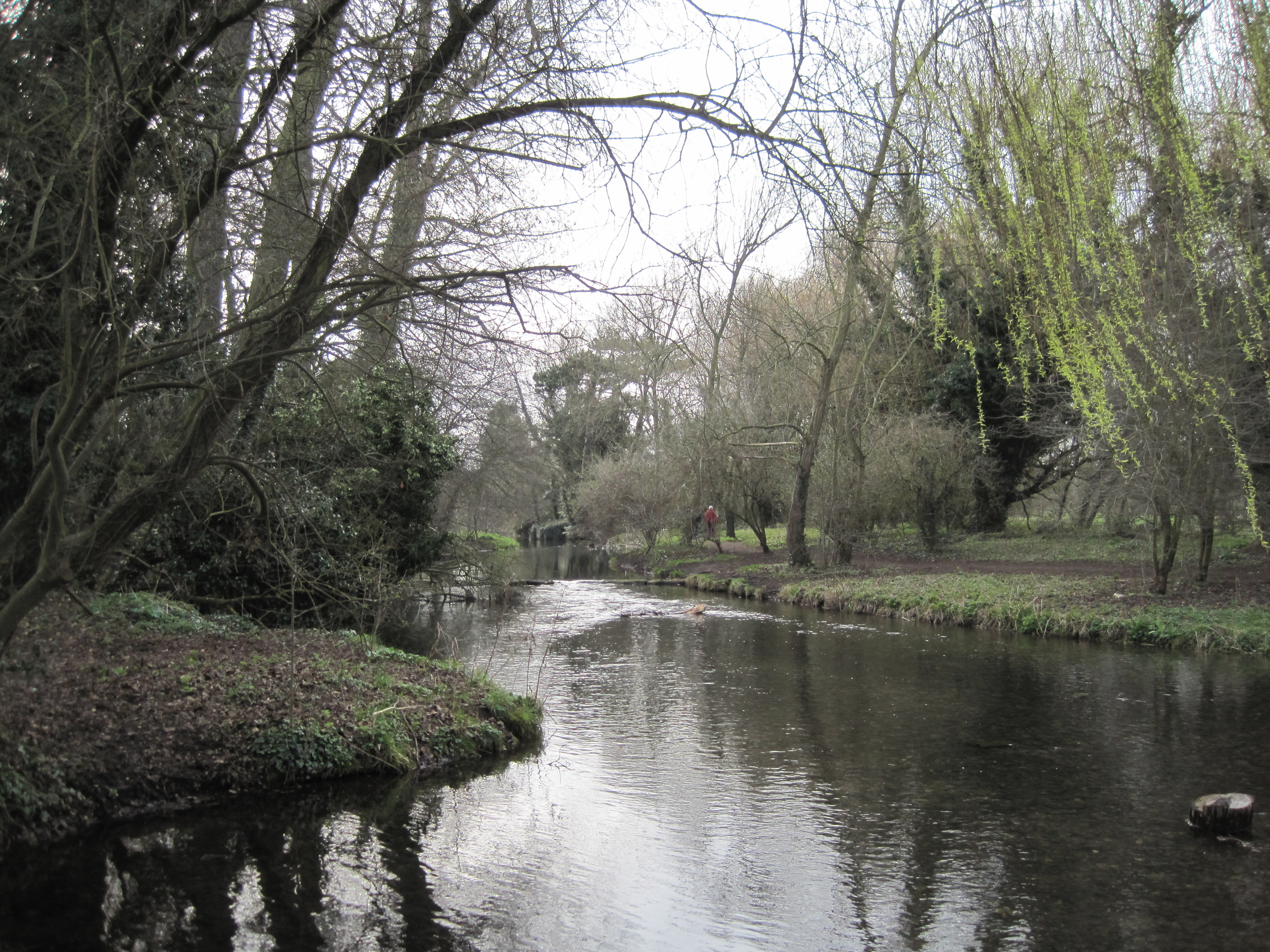
River Cray in Foots Cray Meadows

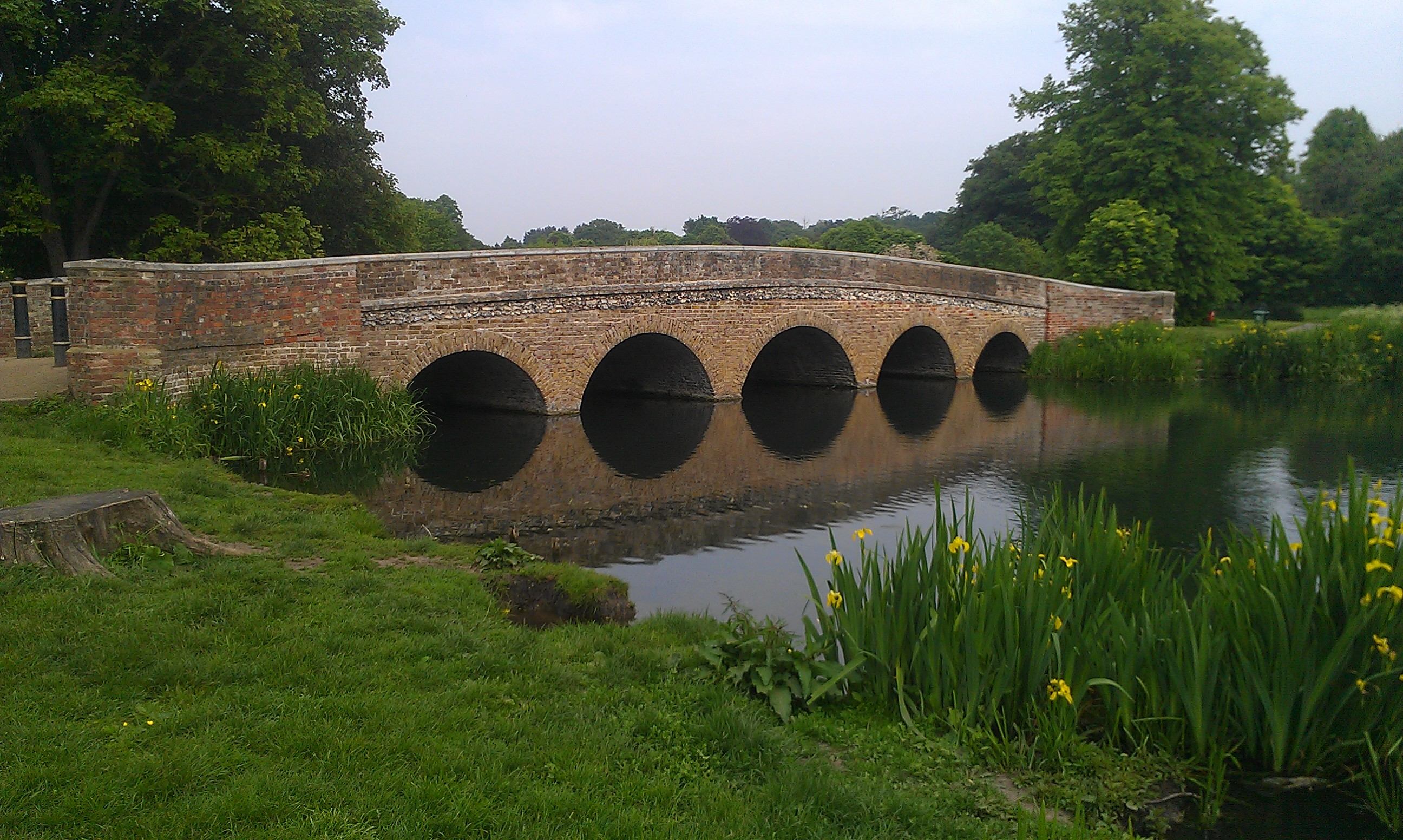

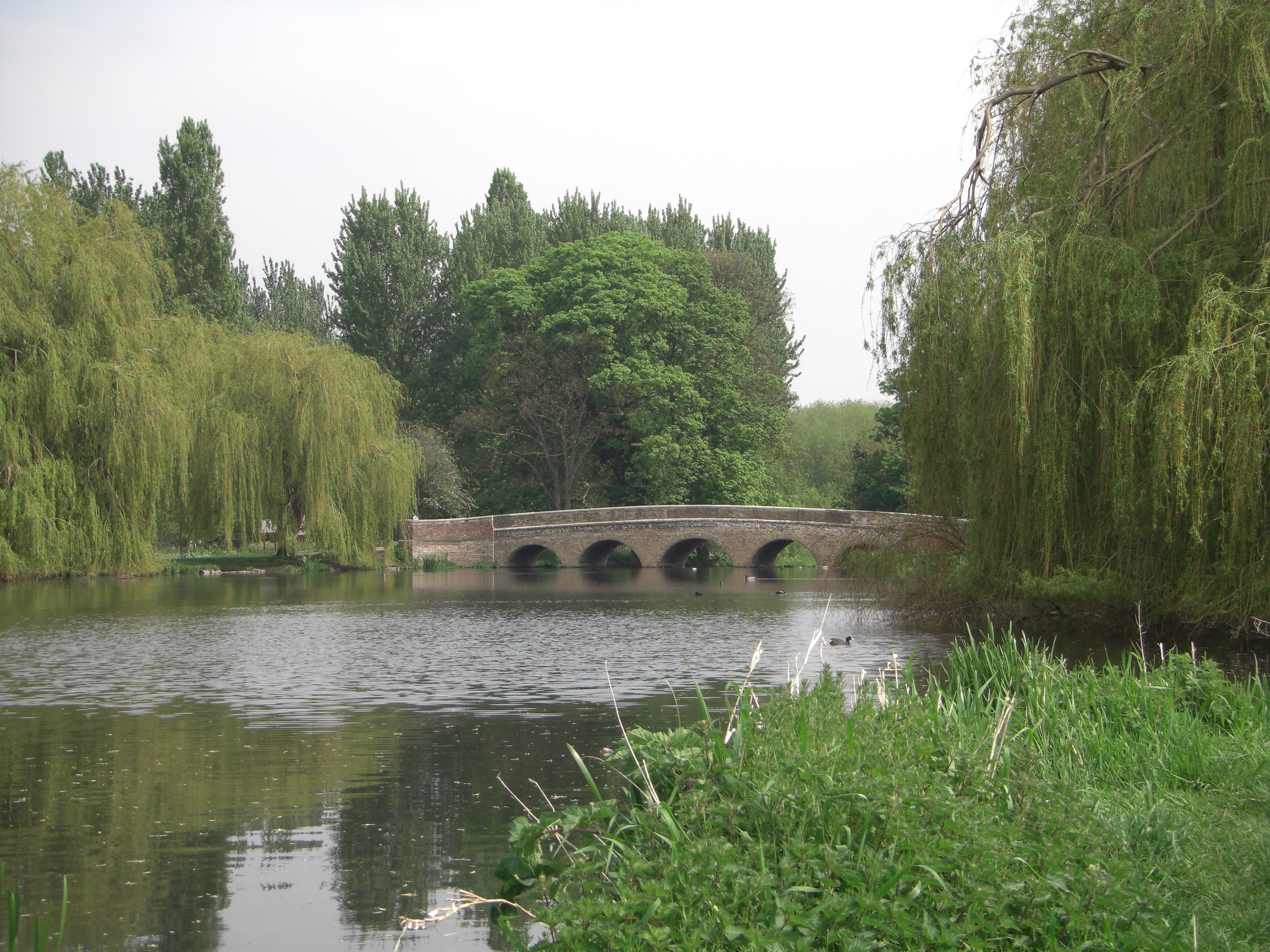
The 18th century Five Arches bridge after its renovation in the 2000s

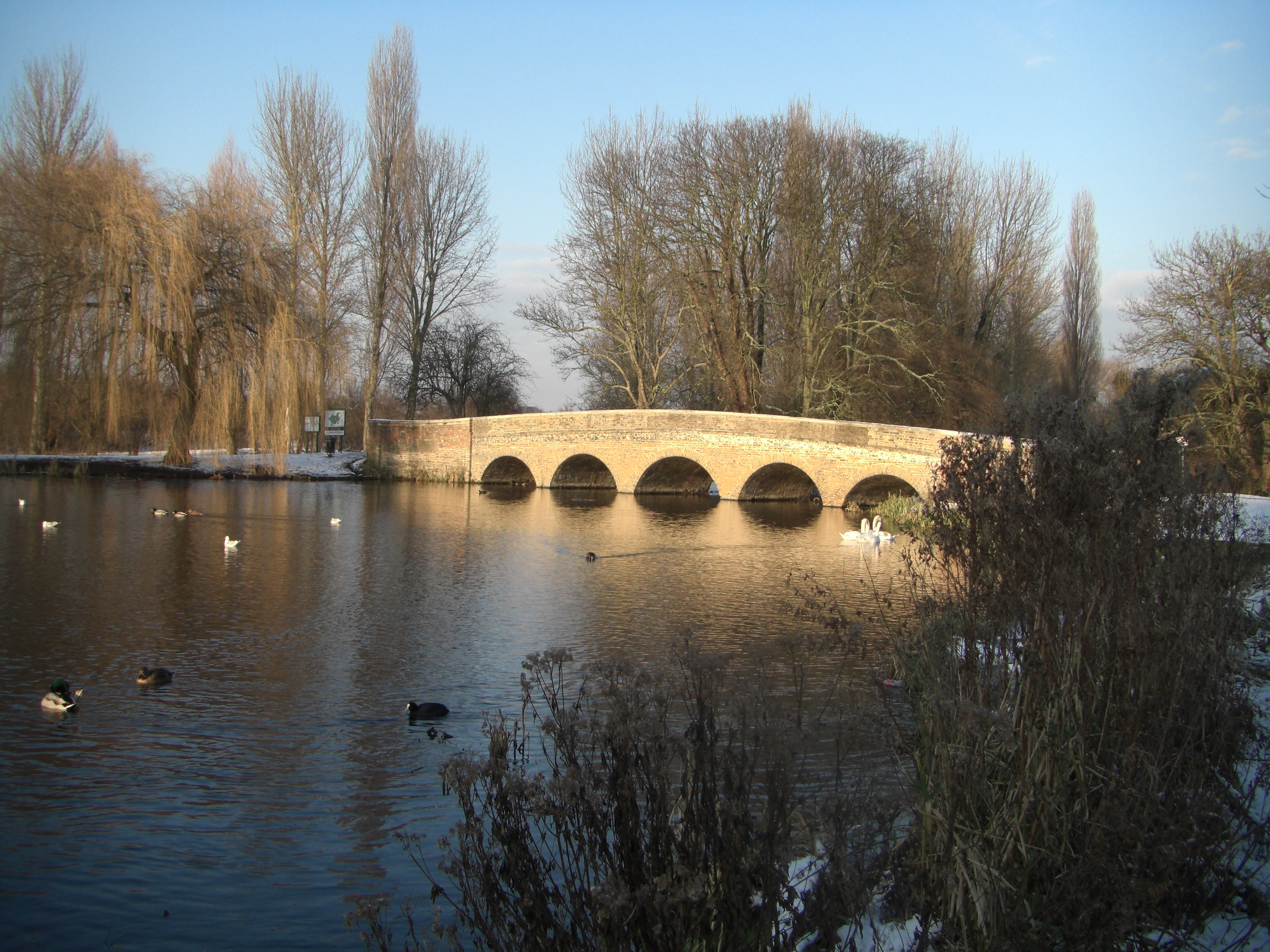
Five Arches in winter

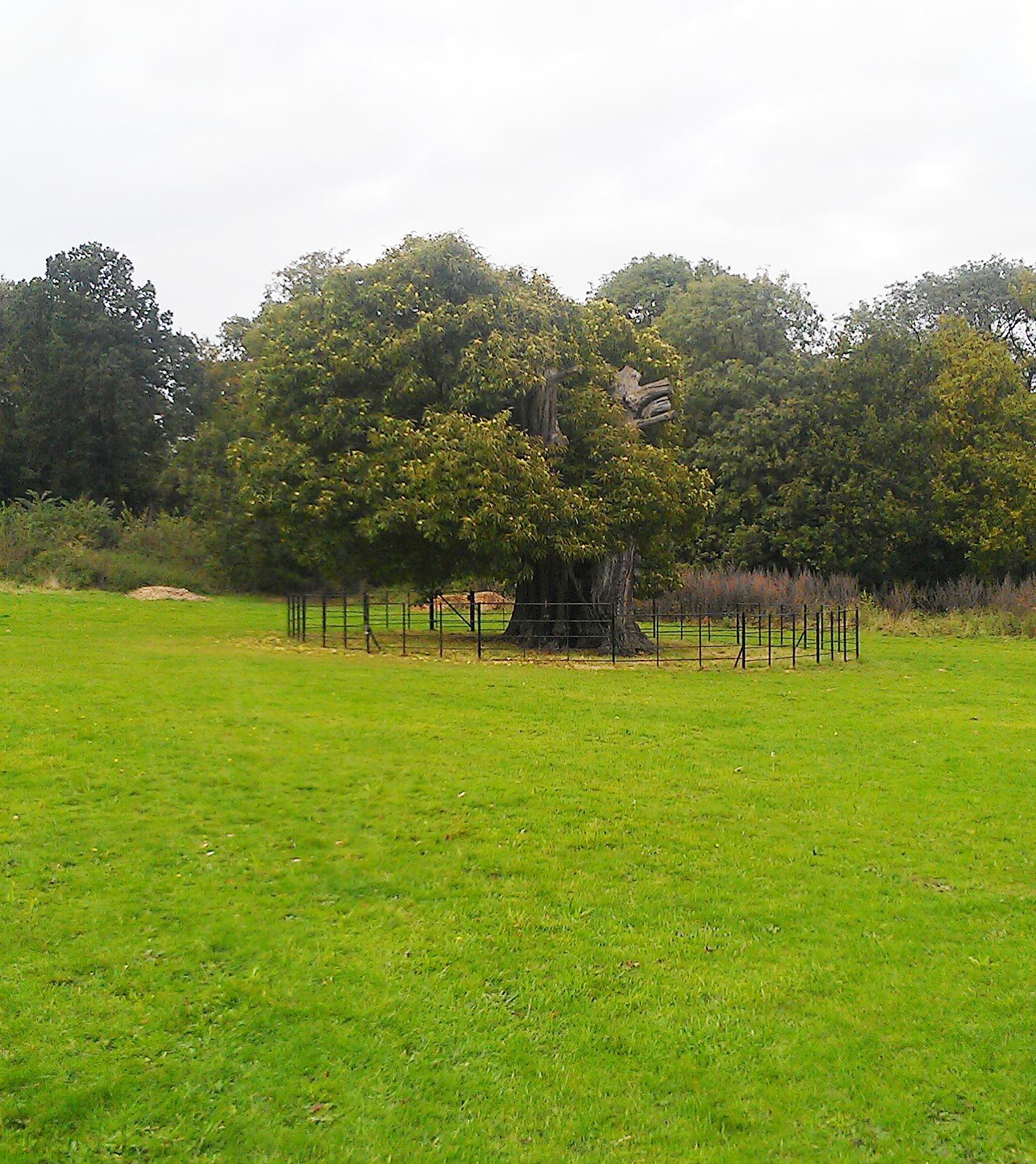
Sweet chestnut tree at the Meadows, one of the oldest documented trees in the region

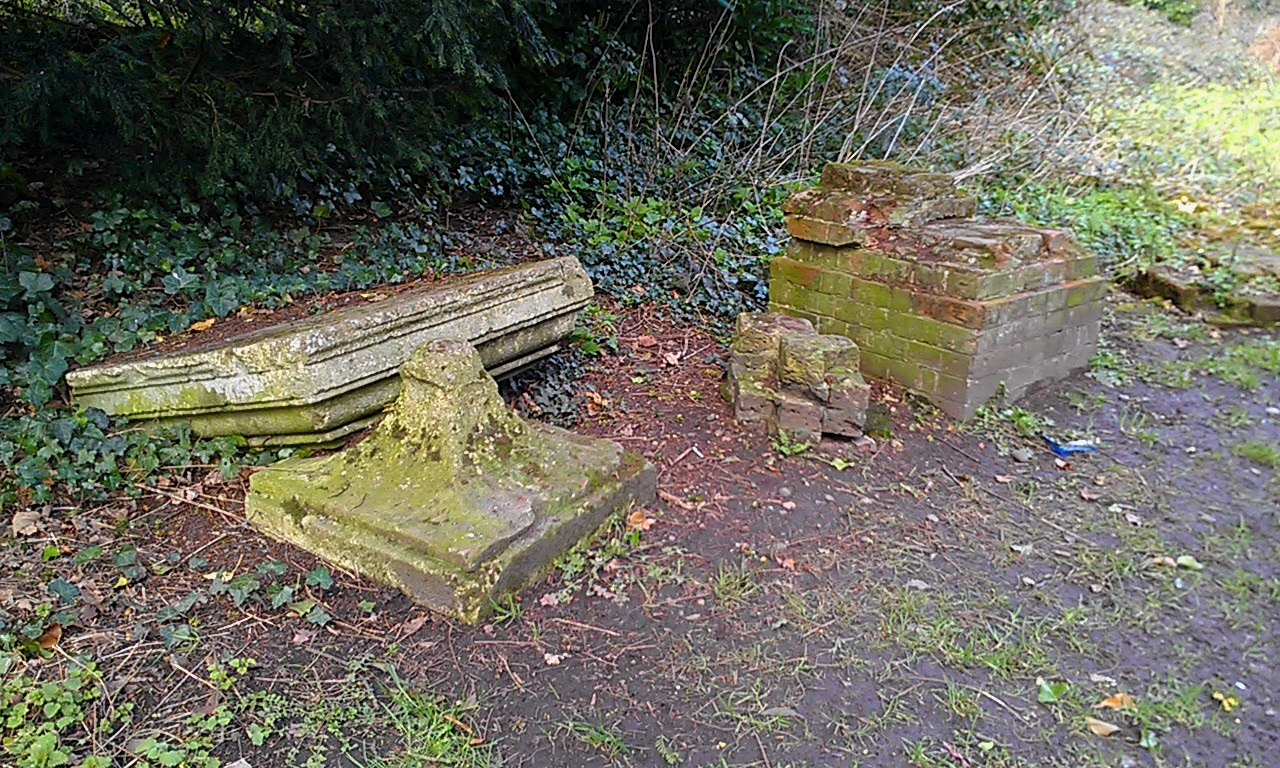
Fallen masonry
