= Samuel Waring, 1st Baron Waring =

British industrialist (1860–1940)

The Lord Waring
- Born: 19 April 1860; Liverpool, Lancashire, England
- Died: 9 January 1940 (aged 79); London, England
- Occupation: Businessman

Samuel James Waring, 1st Baron Waring (19 April 1860 – 9 January 1940), known as Sir Samuel Waring, Bt, between 1919 and 1922, was a British industrialist, public servant and benefactor.

== Biography ==
Waring was the second son of Samuel James Waring, of Liverpool, by Sarah Ann Wells, daughter of Thomas Wells, of Everton, Liverpool. He was the grandson of John Waring, who had arrived in Liverpool from Belfast in 1835 and established a wholesale cabinet maker business. In 1893 Waring was given the task of opening a branch of the family furniture making company in London. In 1897 Waring was responsible for the merger with Gillow and Company in 1897 to become Waring & Gillow, and of which Waring became chairman.

He was High Sheriff of Denbighshire between 1907 and 1908. He acquired Foots Cray Place in Foots Cray, Kent, and spent a considerable amount of money on improving the gardens and estate. He also owned Gopsall Hall in Leicestershire.

During the First World War Waring organised the production of war materials, including aircraft. He was also a director of the Duchess of Sutherland's Cripples' Guild, a member of Executive Committee of National Association of Ex-Soldiers, a supporter of Boy Scout Movement and founder of the Higher Production Council. He was created a Baronet, of Foots Cray Place, in the Parish of Foots Cray, in the County of Kent, in 1919, in recognition of "public and local services". In 1922 he was further honoured when he was raised to the peerage as Baron Waring, of Foots Cray Place in the County of Kent, in recognition of him being a "Pioneer of decorative art in furnishing ... [and a] Generous supporter of charities." His appointment during the Lloyd George honours scandal created a public uproar as he was denounced in parliament as being a war profiteer who had reorganised his company to avoid paying his shareholders, while making a fortune during the war through government contracts.

In 1930 Waring resigned as company chairman and became president until he died. Waring was a Commodore of the Royal Albert Yacht Club and owner of the yacht White Heather which he raced. He was the first president of the Furniture Trades Provident and Benevolent Association.

Lord Waring married Eleanor Caroline Bamford, daughter of Charles Bamford, of Llanrhaiadr Hall, Llanrhaiadr, Denbighshire, and of Brookhurst, Cheshire, in 1890. They had one son, Arthur Samuel Bamford Waring, who died unmarried in 1911, aged 19, and a daughter, the Honourable Eleanor Gladys Waring, who married Captain Arthur Cunliffe Bernard Critchley (later Critchley-Waring). Lord Waring died at his home in London in January 1940, aged 79, when the baronetcy and barony became extinct. In 1946 Lady Waring sold Foots Cray Place to the Kent County Council.

Baronetage of the United Kingdom
New creation	Baronet (of Foots Cray Place); 1919–1940	Extinct
Peerage of the United Kingdom
New creation	Baron Waring; 1922–1940	Extinct
