= Kolster-Brandes =

British manufacturer of radio and television sets

- Type: Subsidiary
- Industry: Electronics
- Predecessor: Brandes
- Founded: 1924 in Slough
- Defunct: 1974
- Fate: Brand was dropped by parent company
- Successor: ITT
- Headquarters: Foots Cray, Sidcup, United Kingdom
- Area served: United Kingdom
- Products: Radio and television sets, tape recorders, amplifiers, headphones and gramophones.
- Owner: ITT

Kolster-Brandes Ltd was a British manufacturer of radio and television sets based in Foots Cray, Sidcup, Kent that was American owned.

== History ==
The company was a descendant of Brandes, a Canadian company founded in Toronto in 1908. Brandes became part of AT&T in 1922 and a British subsidiary Brandes Ltd was established in Slough, in 1924, to manufacture headphones.

The company rapidly expanded producing a range of loud speakers and in 1928 moved to a former silk mill at Foots Cray. The company was renamed Kolster-Brandes Ltd after the American parent company merged with the Kolster Radio Corporation. In 1930 the company supplied 40,000 of its Masterpiece two-valve, bakelite cabinet radios to the Godfrey Phillips tobacco company, who gave them away to customers in exchange for cigarette coupons. K-B also began a long association with Cunard after they won a contract to provide communications equipment for the RMS Queen Mary ocean liner.

In 1938 Kolster-Brandes became part of ITT's British subsidiary Standard Telephones and Cables (STC). The Foots Cray site was also shared by Brimar, another STC company founded in 1933 to manufacture American pattern valves for the British market.

In 1960/61 STC took over Ace, Argosy, Regentone and RGD, and then in 1968 the Kolster-Brandes logo name changed to ITT KB, and between 1973 and 1974 the KB was dropped from the logo and sets were only made under the ITT label.

== Products ==
Kolster-Brandes later went on to make mid-range electronics such as radios, radiograms, televisions, tape recorders, amplifiers and gramophones.

KB made a large number of radios and radiograms, a few models of which were the 285, 422 Cavalcade, 666 and the CG20.

The company also made a popular selection of record players which include the Playtime, Gaytime, Dancetime, Tunetime and Rhythm, the last two of which are valve operated.
