= Holburt Waring =

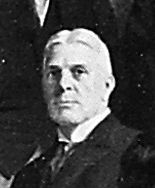
Sir Holburt J Waring, from a 1927 group portrait. Credit:Wellcome Library

Sir Holburt Jacob Waring, 1st Baronet, CBE, FRCS (3 October 1866 – 10 February 1953) was a surgeon at St Bartholomew's Hospital, London and was vice-chancellor of the University of London from 1922 to 1924.

== Early life ==
He was born in Chorley, Lancashire, the eldest son of Isaac Waring, a schoolmaster, and his wife, Catherine Holburt. He attended Owen's College, Manchester, (now the University of Manchester) and gained a BSc in physiology (1888), an MB (1890) in medicine and forensic medicine, a BS (1891) and MS in 1893.^{[a]} He became FRCS in 1891.

== Career ==
He was demonstrator of anatomy and teacher of surgery at St Bartholomews and rose to become consulting surgeon.

During the First World War he was a colonel in the Royal Army Medical Corps and consulting surgeon in addition to his hospital work. He was an officer of the Légion d'honneur.

He represented the Faculty of Medicine in the Senate of the University of London and in 1920 he was elected dean of the Faculty of Medicine, and was vice-chancellor of the university from 1922 to 1924. He was also the first vice-president of the St Bartholomew's Hospital Medical College and instrumental in getting it affiliated to the university.

He was elected President of the Medical Society of London (1925–26) and in 1932 was elected president of the Royal College of Surgeons of England, serving until 1934.

== Personal life ==
He was awarded CBE in 1919, knighted in 1925 and became a baronet in 1935.

In 1900 he married Annie Cassandra (d 1948) and they had a son, Alfred Harold (1902–1981), who was a research engineer at ICI.

He died at his home in Tidenham, Gloucestershire, in 1953.

== See also ==
- Waring baronets
- List of Vice-Chancellors of the University of London

Academic offices
Preceded by Sir Sydney Russell-Wells	Vice-Chancellor of the University of London; 1922–1924	Succeeded by Ernest Arthur Gardner
Baronetage of the United Kingdom
New creation	Baronet (of St Bartholomew's); 1935–1953	Succeeded by Alfred Harold Waring
