= Walsh baronets =

Set index on Walsh baronets

There have been two baronetcies created for persons with the surname Walsh, one in the Baronetage of Ireland and one in the Baronetage of the United Kingdom. Both creations are extinct.

- Walsh baronets of Little Ireland (1645)
- Walsh baronets of Ormathwaite and Warfield (1804): see Baron Ormathwaite
