= Foots Cray Place =

Country house in London, England

Coordinates: 51.427°N 0.120°E

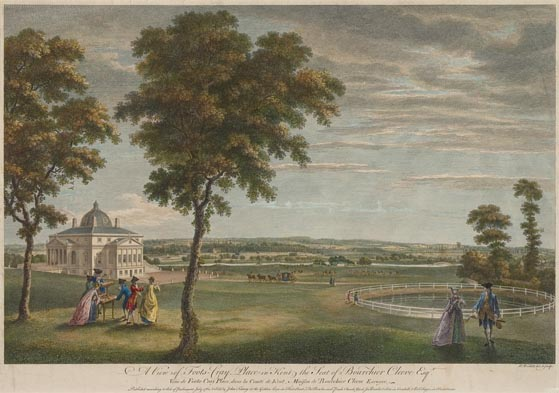
Foots Cray Place, engraved by William Woollett, 1760

Foots Cray Place was one of the four country houses built in England in the 18th century to a design inspired by Palladio's Villa Capra near Vicenza. Built in 1754 near Sidcup, Kent, Foots Cray Place was demolished in 1950 after a fire in 1949. Of the three other houses in England, Nuthall Temple in Nottinghamshire was built in 1757 and demolished in 1929; the other two survive: Mereworth Castle (completed in 1725, also in Kent) and Chiswick House (completed in 1729, in London), both now Grade I listed buildings. A modern fifth example, Henbury Hall, was built near Macclesfield in the 1980s. Another example of a similar structure in England is the Temple of the Four Winds at Castle Howard, which is a garden building not a house.

== Earlier houses ==
The Kentish manor of Foots Cray is mentioned in Domesday Book. Later, it was acquired by the Walsingham family and held for six generations until it was sold around 1676. An Elizabethan E-shaped house – also known as Pike Place – was still on the site in the 1680s. The estate passed through several hands before it was purchased by Bourchier Cleeve in 1752 for £5,450. Cleeve had the old house pulled down and a new one constructed slightly further north in about 1754.

== Palladian mansion ==
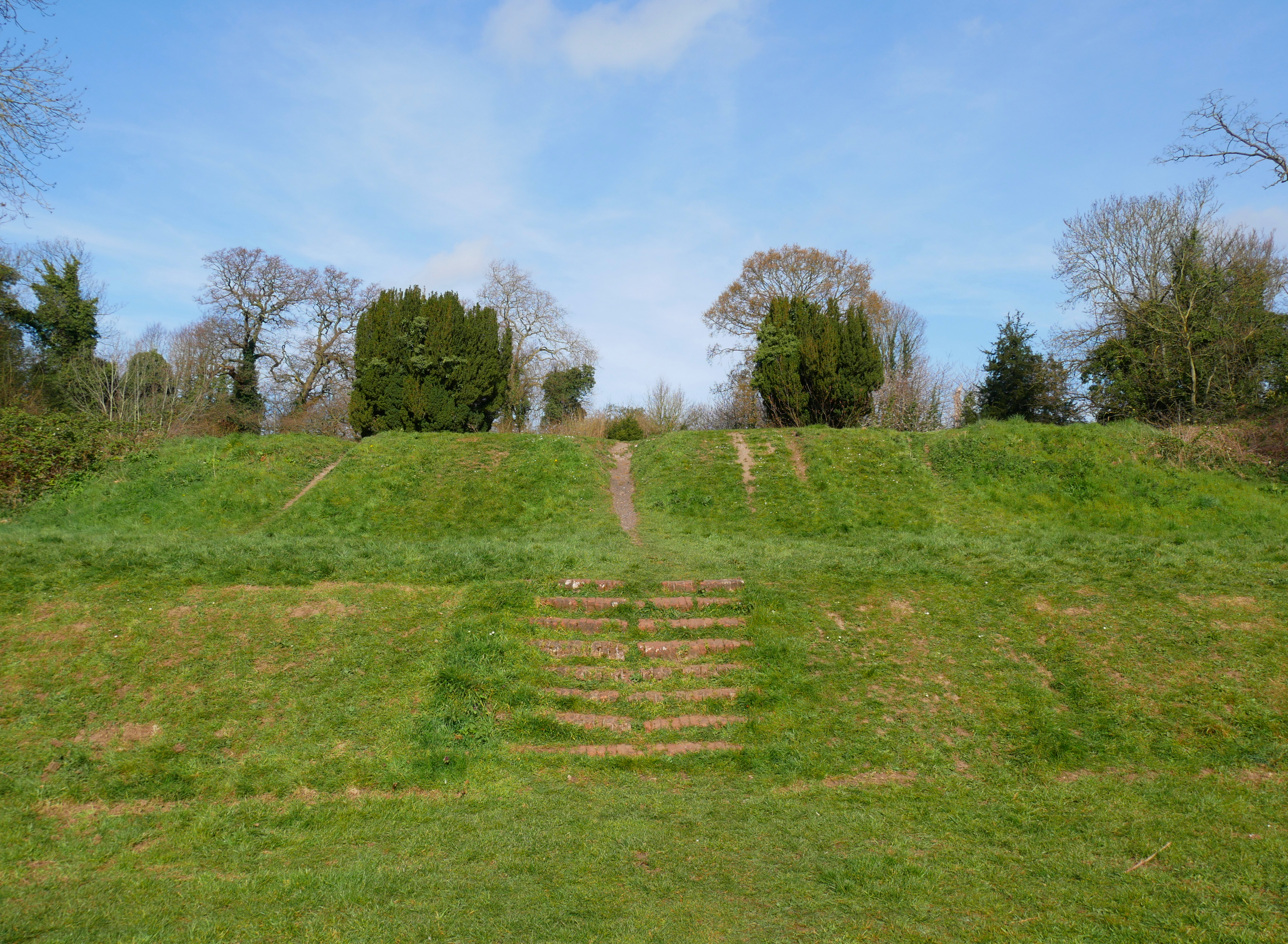
The location of Foots Cray Place

The design of the Neo-Palladian mansion has been attributed to the architect Isaac Ware in Vitruvius Britannicus iv (1777, pls. 8-10), but it has also been suggested that Matthew Brettingham the Younger or Daniel Garrett could have been the designer.

Following the model of the Villa Capra, it had a large square central block surmounted by a wide dome, with a portico on each face, all constructed in stone. Three of the porticos at Foots Cray Place were filled in to create additional internal space. The central hall was octagonal, with a gallery leading to the upper rooms, lit from above. The service buildings were built in brick a short distance from the main house. Cleeve accumulated a large collection of paintings, including examples by Rembrandt, Reubens, Van Dyke, Canaletto and Holbein, which he displayed at Foots Cray Place.

The estate was inherited by Cleeve's daughter on his death in 1760; she married Sir George Yonge in 1767, and the house was sold to Benjamin Harenc in 1772 for £14,500. He had it remodelled in 1792 by the minor London architect Henry Hakewill. Harenc's son sold the house in 1821 to Nicholas Vansittart, then Chancellor of the Exchequer and soon to become ennobled as Baron Bexley. Hakewill further remodelled the house in 1823, and more works were carried out for Lord Bexley by another London architect of equally modest reputation, John William Hiort, who also built Bexley's London house in Great George Street, Westminster. The Vansittart family retained the house and estate until it was sold to Samuel Waring (later Baron Waring) in the late 19th century.

In 1939, at the beginning of World War II, the house was requisitioned for use by the Thames Nautical Training College, HMS "Worcester" whose ship of that name had been requisitioned by the Admiralty. Lord Waring died in 1940, and after the College vacated the property, dilapidated after its wartime use, in 1946, Waring's widow sold the house and grounds to Kent County Council for use as a museum. A fire in October 1949 caused extensive damage, and the house was demolished in 1950.

== Foots Cray Meadows ==
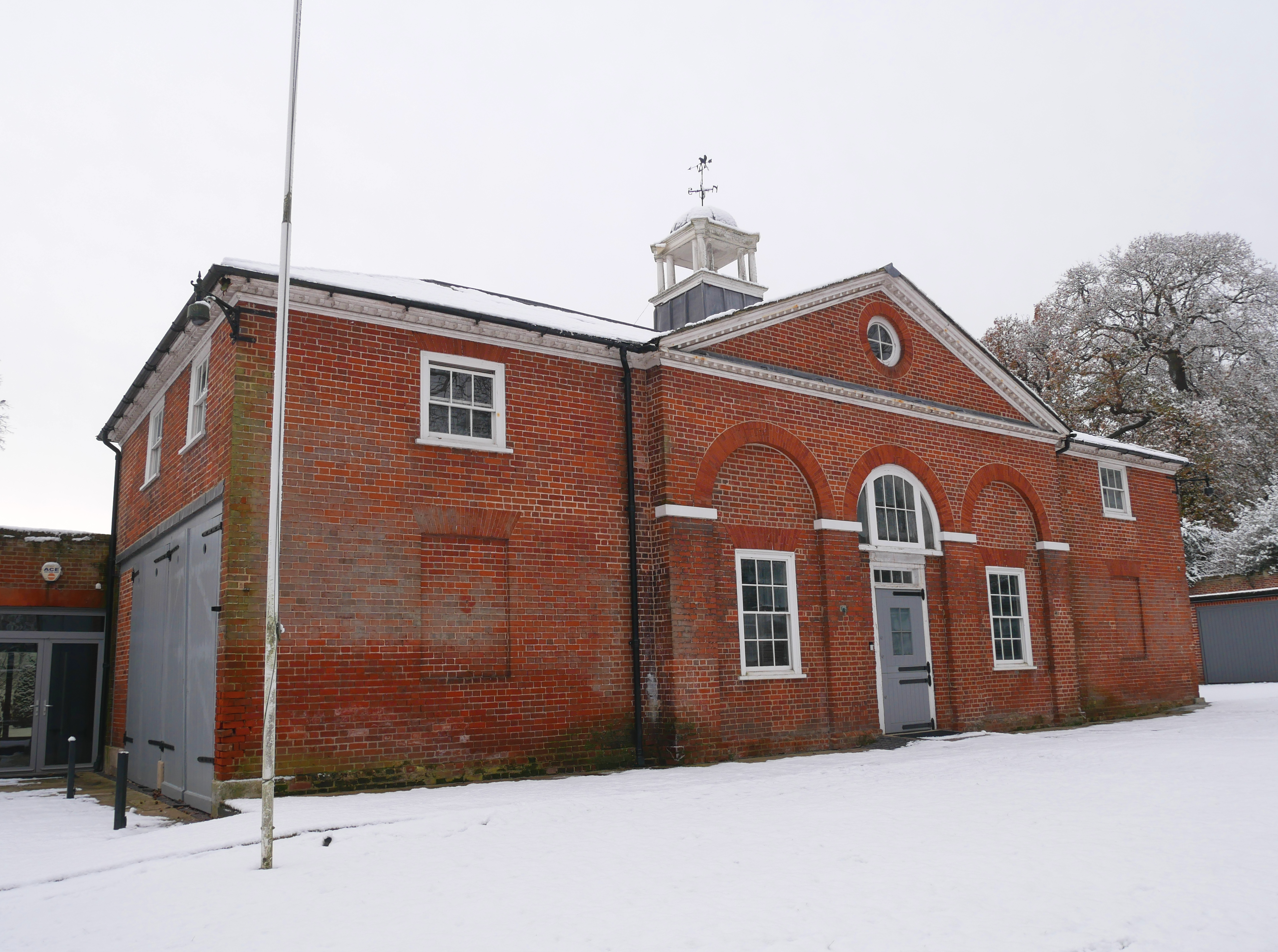
The north face of the Foots Cray Place Stable Block

The stable block and walled gardens with pavilion remains standing, but the grounds, known as Foots Cray Meadows, provide a valuable public green space in this south-eastern suburb of London. This 220-acre (89-hectare) park was formed in the early 19th century from two mid-18th-century landscaped parks and is listed by English Heritage as a Grade II historic park, and it is a Local Nature Reserve. The London Outer Orbital Path passes through Foots Cray Meadows on its way from Old Bexley to Sidcup Place and Petts Wood. There is some industry in an area next to the meadows and bordering the river.
