= F. G. Loring =

English naval officer and writer

Frederick George Loring (11 March, 1869–7 September, 1951) was an English naval officer and writer, and an early expert in wireless telegraphy.

== Family ==
Loring was born on 11 March 1869 in Ryde, Isle of Wight (then still part of Hampshire), the eldest son of Admiral Sir William Loring (d. 1895), and his wife, Frances Louisa Adams. His grandfather, Sir John Wentworth Loring (1775–1852), had been the lieutenant-governor of the Royal Naval College, Portsmouth in 1819–37, and his great-grandfather, Joshua Loring (1716–1881), a colonial American commodore in the Royal Navy, who moved to London after 1776. In 1896 he married Charlotte Elizabeth Arbuthnot (1862–1933), daughter of the Hon. James Edward Arbuthnot of Mauritius; they had two daughters, Evelyn Frances and Iris. In 1949 he remarried, to Margaret Mackenzie, daughter of Montague S. Napier. Loring died on 7 September 1951 in Foots Cray, Kent.

== Career ==
Loring served as a sub-lieutenant on the royal yacht Victoria and Albert in 1891. As a lieutenant he was aboard HMS Victoria when she was rammed and sunk by HMS Camperdown off Tripoli on 22 June 1893 with much loss of life, and was awarded a bronze medal by the Royal Humane Society for saving two lives.

In 1896, he qualified as a torpedo lieutenant and joined the staff of HMS Defiance, the schoolship, at Devonport, where he was among the first to specialize in wireless telegraphy. He was put in charge of Admiralty shore wireless stations, and in 1904 selected to accompany Guglielmo Marconi to America for wireless experiments. He retired in December 1909 with the rank of commander, having transferred to the Post Office, where he was inspector of wireless telegraphy responsible for the operating staff until his retirement in 1930. He was appointed a civil OBE in 1926 for his services to the development of radio. In 1930, he continued his career in the International Marine Radio Company, where he became a director. He finally retired from the company in 1950.

== Writings ==
E. J. Sullivan, The Tomb of Sarah (1900)

Loring's writing abilities appeared first as a technical journalist and as naval correspondent for the Western Morning News.

Loring also wrote poetry and short stories, of which "The Tomb of Sarah" gained acclaim as a classic vampire story after it appeared in volume XXII of Pall Mall Magazine in 1900. It tells what happens when the tomb of the evil Countess Sarah, murdered in 1630, is disturbed during the restoration of a church. Along with Hume Nisbet's "The Vampire Maid" and E. F. Benson's "Mrs. Amworth", it is among the foremost early 20th-century stories to feature a female vampire.

The story soon began to be anthologized. Later it was included in the 1939 Everyman Ghost Stories, the 1977 Citadel Press Dracula Book of Great Vampire Stories, and the Oxford University Press anthologies Victorian Ghost Stories (1991) and The Young Oxford Book of Supernatural Stories (1997). Ray Danton's 1972 film Crypt of the Living Dead was an uncredited adaptation of this.

== External source ==
"The Tomb of Sarah" can be read online here or here.

- Works by F. G. Loring at LibriVox (public domain audiobooks)
