= River Cray =

River in Greater London, England

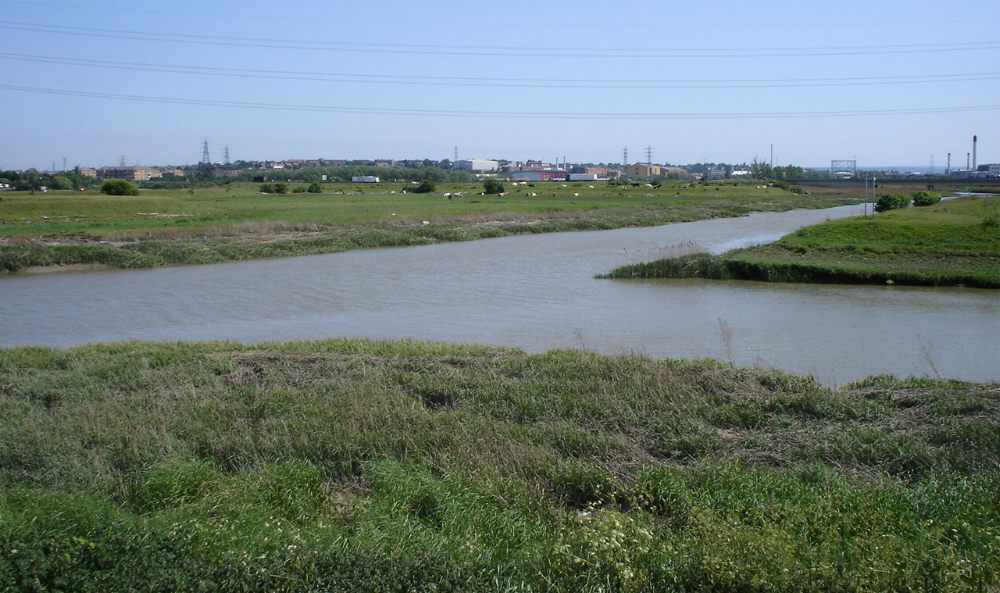
- Confluence of the River Darent and the River Cray (right) on Crayford Marshes.

Physical characteristics
- Source
  - location: Orpington Pond; TQ 467 668
  - coordinates: 51°22′51″N 0°06′24″E
  - elevation: 54 m (177 ft)
- Mouth
  - location: River Darent; TQ 536 760
  - coordinates: 51°27′43″N 0°12′38″E
  - elevation: 2 m (6 ft 7 in)
- Length: 9 mi (14 km)

River Cray, in relation to the Darent and other Rivers of Kent

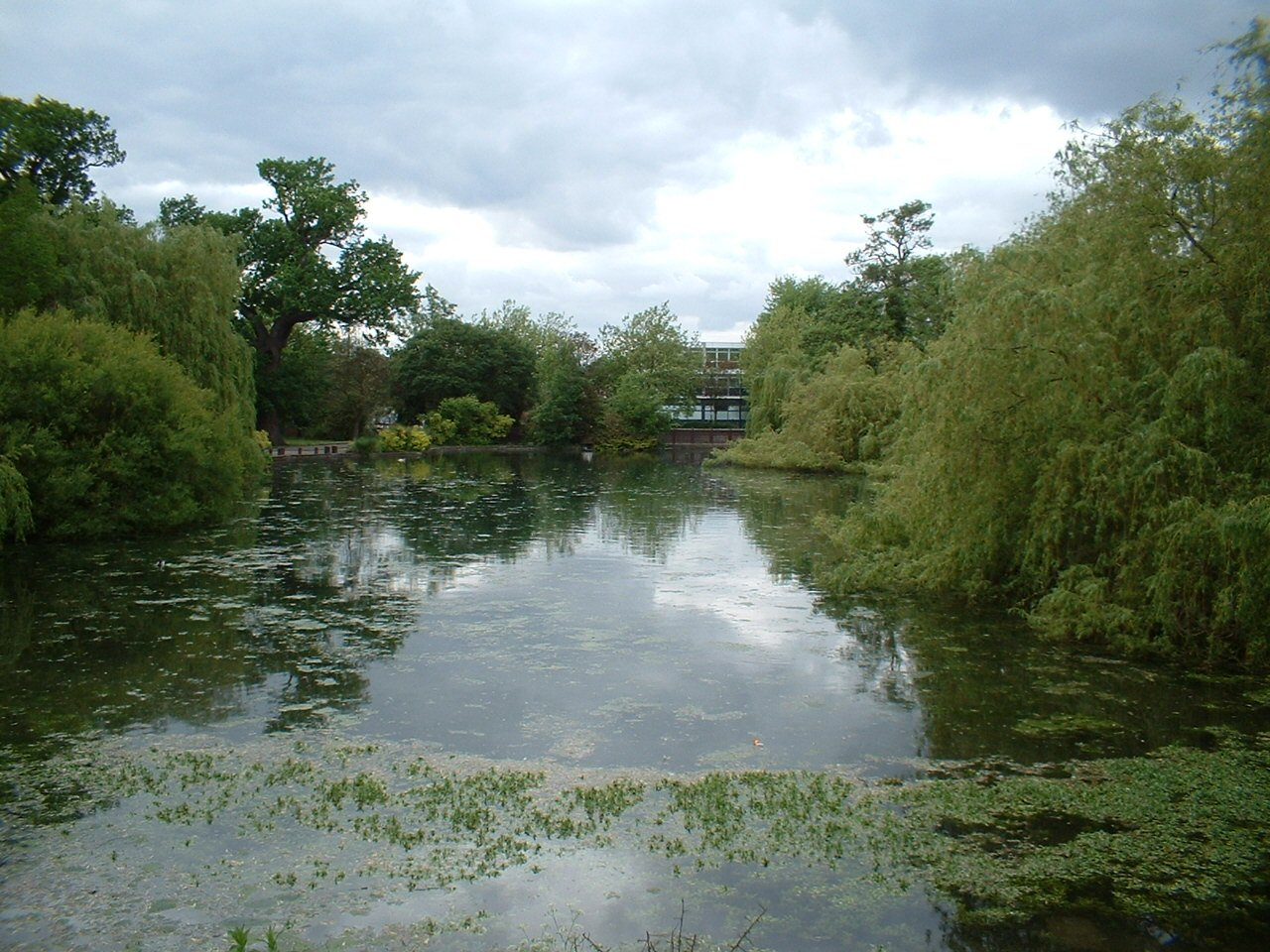
Orpington pond is the source of the River Cray

The River Cray is the largest tributary of the River Darent. It is the prime river of outer, south-east Greater London, rising in Priory Gardens, Orpington, where rainwater percolates through the chalk bedrock of the Downs to form a pond where the eroded ground elevation gives way to impermeable clay. Initially it flows true to form northwards, past industrial and residential St Mary Cray, through St Paul's Cray (where it once powered a paper mill) and through Foots Cray, where it enters the parkland Foots Cray Meadows, flowing under by Five Arches bridge (built in 1781 as part of their designs by Capability Brown). It then flows by restored Loring Hall (c.1760), home of the Lord Castlereagh who killed himself there in 1822. It continues through North Cray and Bexley. It neighbours a restored Gothic (architecture) cold plunge bath house, built around 1766 as part of Vale Mascal Estate. It is then joined by the River Shuttle (a small brook) and then continues through the parkland of Hall Place, which was built for John Champneys in 1540. The Cray turns eastward through Crayford and Barnes Cray to join the Darent in Dartford Creek. The Creek is a well-watered partly tidal inlet (of the Tideway) between Crayford Marshes and Dartford Marshes by a slight projection of land, Crayford Ness. The villages through which the Cray flows are collectively known as "The Crays".

== Overview ==
Clean-ups on the (non-tidal) river and campaigns for responsible angling are organised by the Cray Anglers Conservation Group. The tidal section is effectively monitored and maintained by The Dartford and Crayford Restoration Trust, who also organise Lengthsman duties for the banks. There is a signposted public footpath called the Cray Riverway alongside the river, beginning at Foots Cray Meadows and continuing for 10 miles (about 16 km) northwards to the Thames. It is part of the London LOOP. The river is a Site of Metropolitan Importance for Nature Conservation.

== Settlements ==
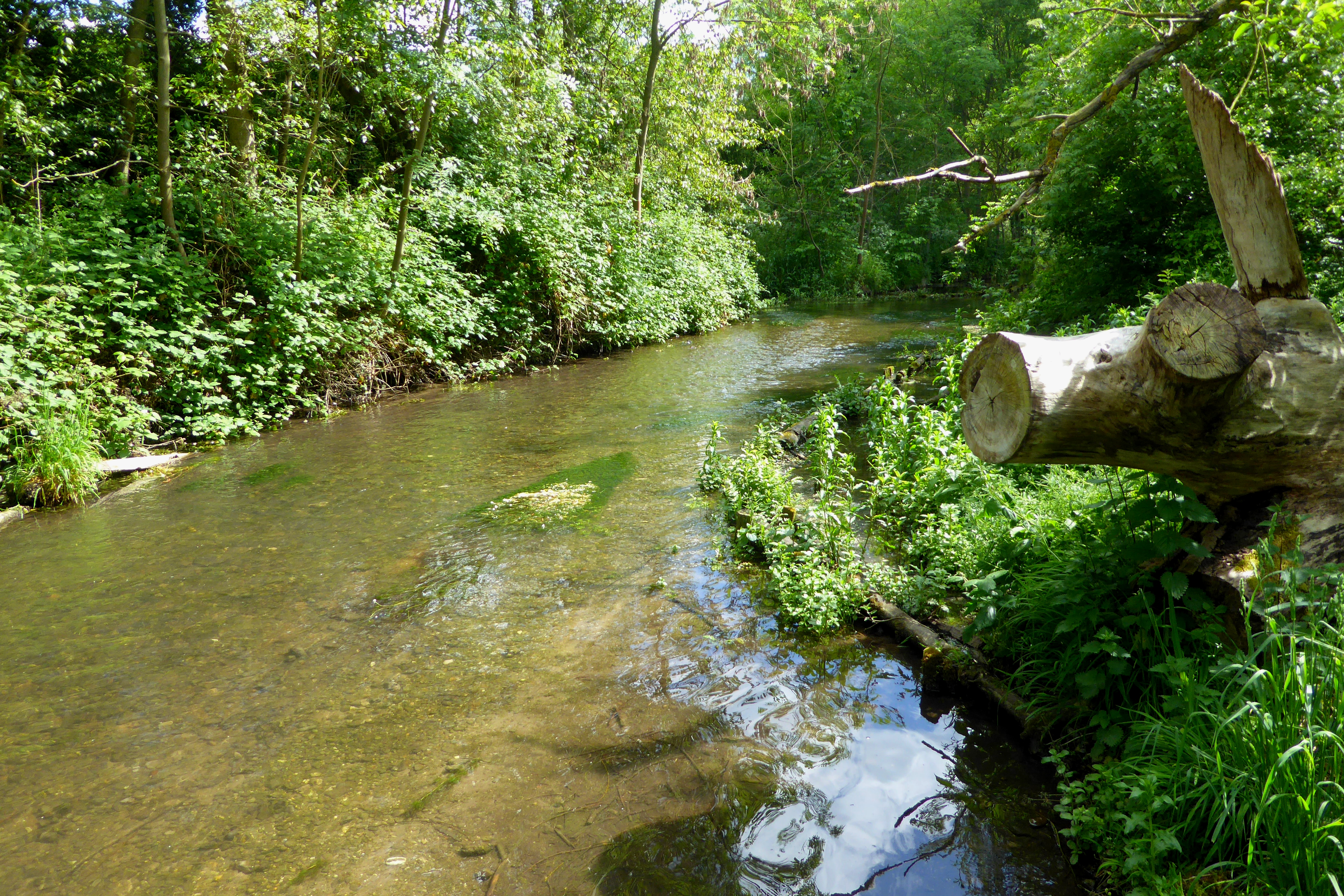
The Cray passing through Foots Cray Meadows

From south to north, settlements and features along the river include:

- Orpington
- St Mary Cray
- St Paul's Cray
- A20 road
- Foots Cray
- Bexley village
- A2 road
- Crayford

== Watermills ==
The River Cray powered fourteen watermills. From source to mouth they were:

=== Orpington Mill ===
TQ 467 669
A Domesday site, Orpington Mill stood almost at the source of the River Cray. The mill building dated from the 18th century and was of traditional construction, with a timber frame clad with weatherboards under a peg tile roof. The mill was powered by an 11 ft 6 in (3.51 m) by 9 feet (2.74 m) cast iron waterwheel carried on a cast iron axle which had replaced an earlier wooden one. Much of the machinery was of cast iron, including the wallower, great spur wheel and crown wheel. The upright shaft was of wood. The mill drove three pairs of millstones. Miller John Colgate had introduced steam power by the 1870s, and the tall chimney for the steam engine was known locally as "Colgate's Folly", as it did not function as well as intended. The mill was used as a store in its final years before its demolition in 1934 or 1935.

=== Snelling's Mill, St Mary Cray ===
TQ 472 677
A weir near the Temple URC Church marked the site of a Domesday mill. The mill was demolished in 1872 and the area landscaped as part of the grounds of a public park. William Joynson bought the mill for £8,000 to enable the creation of the park.

The 13 ft 4 in (4.06 m) by 8 ft 6 in (2.59 m) cast iron waterwheel survived. It was used to drive a beam pump which supplied water to fountains and conservatories at "The Rookery". The wheel was intact until 1962, when the shed it was in was stripped of ivy and exposed. The wheel was then vandalised and had been cleared away by March 1964.

=== Upper Paper Mill, St Mary Cray ===
TQ 472 682
This mill stood opposite the Black Boy public house; it had an undershot waterwheel. Nicholas Townsend was mentioned in insurance records in 1757, and William Sims in 1771. In 1784 William Townsend was first mentioned as a paper maker in St Mary Cray. In 1786 Samuel Lay of Sittingbourne was the paper maker; he was described as a master papermaker in 1801. Martha Lay ordered two moulds in 1806. Martha Lay was running the mill in 1816; paper from this mill bore the watermark Martha Lay 1804. The mill ceased working in 1834.

=== Joynson's Mill, St Mary Cray ===
TQ 471 684
This was a corn mill which stood near St Mary Cray church. It was replaced by a paper mill, then a paper factory and in recent years by a warehouse complex.

In 1787 this mill was being run by Henry Brightly. John Hall was the owner in 1816. Charles Cowan was working at the mill in 1819, when the mill had two vats and was producing an estimated 1,500 pounds (680 kg) of paper a week. William Joynson took over in 1834. He had previously been at a paper mill in Snodland. Paper produced here bore the watermarks "Joynson Superfine" or "WJ&S" over "St Mary Cray Kent". In 1839, Joynson was granted a patent for watermarking paper produced by machine. The waterwheel was of cast iron construction and may have been overshot, as the head was some 8 feet (2.4 m) to 9 feet (2.7 m). The mill was expanded in 1853, when a second machine was installed, enabling the steam driven mills to produce 25 to 30 tons of paper a week. William Joynson died in 1874 and the mills were left in trust to his two grandsons. One of them, William, drowned in 1875 leaving Edmund Hamborough Joynson as sole heir. Cowan mentions that the mill was producing an estimated 70,000 pounds (32,000 kg) of paper a week in 1878. Some 700 people were employed at the mill in 1881 and E. H. Joynson took over the mill in September 1882, expanding it the following year with a new steam engine and machinery. An engraving of the mill in 1891 can be seen here. Joynson produced only high quality writing papers. In the late 1890s, a dryer was sold to Nash's and installed in their mill at St Pauls Cray. Edmund Joynson took his son into partnership shortly before World War One. The firm became William Joynson & Son. In 1914, Joynson's paper was used in the first £1 and 10/- banknotes issued by the Bank of England. Edmund H Joynson retired in 1930 and the mills were taken over by Messrs Wiggins Teape & Co. who promptly closed the mills in order to rebuild them. 350 people were made redundant, and only 200 were employed in the reopened factory. The paper factory made greaseproof and vegetable parchment paper. The mill reopened in April 1933 as the Vegetable Parchment Mills (Delcroix) Ltd. The production of "vulcanised fibre" began around 1943. In 1963 the mill was the home of the National Paper Museum The mill closed in 1967 and the paper museum collection was transferred to the Museum of Science and Industry in Manchester.

=== St Paul's Cray Mill ===
TQ 474 694
In 1718 this mill had two waterwheels driving machinery for dressing leather in oil, and a third for corn milling. The mill was replaced by a paper mill, powered by a turbine.

=== St Paul's Cray (Nash's) Paper Mill ===
TQ 474 694
This paper mill replaced the earlier corn mill. Papermaking had been established by 1742. A steam engine had been installed by around 1820. It was used in the 1830s as a meeting place for Baptists. In 1845, Mary Ann Nash inherited the profits and rents of the mill until her sons came of age under the terms of her husband's will. Mary Ann Nash died on 7 June 1852. Thomas Nash enlarged the mill in 1853. After his death at the age of 21, his brother William was manager under the trustees until he came of age in 1857. William Nash was married twice, and had five children. In 1870 they moved from the Mill House to a new house called Crayfield House. It is recorded that the axle of the waterwheel protruded into the kitchen of the Mill House. William Nash died on 11 September 1879 and the mill was in the hands of trustees again. In 1898 a 250 horsepower (about 190 kW) double-expansion condensing steam engine by Pollitt & Wigzell was installed, along with a second paper machine. Shortly after this a secondhand dryer was purchased from Joynson's mill to replace one that had proved unsuitable. By 1954 the site was a factory complex. It had been demolished by 1986.

=== Foot's Cray Mill ===
Foot's Cray mill was a paper mill. By the 1870s it was used as a fabric printing works. In 1900 the mill was being used as a factory making photographic film. Its final function was the processing of silk. The paper mill had two cast iron overshot waterwheels in parallel. Each was 15 feet (4.57 m) diameter. One was 10 feet 6 inches (3.20 m) wide and the other was 5 feet (1.52 m) wide. The mill was demolished in 1929.

=== Old Mill, Bexley ===
TQ 496 735

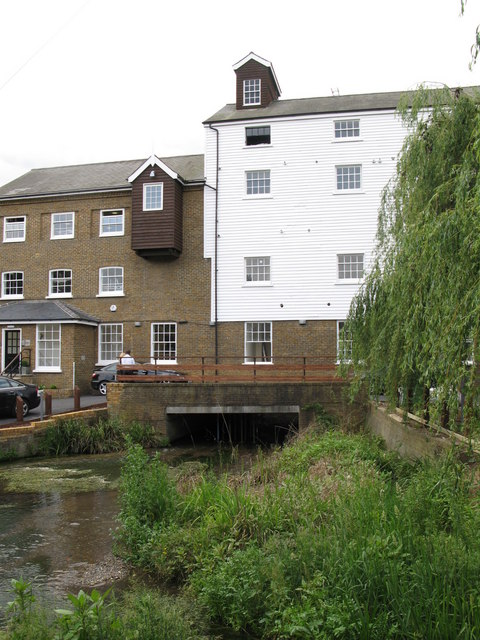
The Old Mill PH

A Domesday site, one of three in Bexley. This was a corn mill. In 1255, the miller, Auxellus, was censured for allowing the escape of a suspected murderer. A millstone was bought for 55s.6d. in 1300. The last building on the site dated from 1779, when the low breast shot waterwheel of 14 feet (4.27 m) by 10 feet (3.05 m) powered four pairs of millstones. It was owned by the Cannon family from 1839 to 1907. Stephen Cannon was the first of the Cannon family, also running mills on the River Darent. The miller in 1872 was Stephen Cannon (son), who concentrated the business at Bexley, the mills on the Darent being sold. A steam engine was installed in 1884, the tall chimney was built by a Mr Hart from Lancashire, who fell from the top whilst doing repairs and lived to tell the tale as his fall was broken by the roof of the engine house. The Cannon family sold Bexley mill in 1907. The mill was used in its latter days for making sacks. A picture of the mill can be seen here. The mill was burnt down on 12 May 1966 and was replaced by the Old Mill PH, a pub with a mill theme. In 2007, the pub/restaurant was converted into residential accommodation in the form of flats. Archaeological work carried out by Wessex Archaeology that took place prior to the redevelopment found that "Aside from the levelling deposits no archaeological deposits or remains were observed" and that "No traces of the medieval / post-medieval mill or of the wing shown on the 1873 Ordnance Survey maps of the area were observed" either.

=== Hall Place Mill, Bexley ===
TQ 502 743
A Domesday site, this mill stood behind the mansion of Hall Place. The mill was run by the Cannon family at one time. It was a corn mill until 1882, and was then converted to a silk printing and flagmaking factory. It was demolished by a traction engine in 1925, with some of the main beams being sold to an American millionaire, Mr Brady. He used them in the construction of a mansion. The low breast shot waterwheel was 14 feet (4.27 m) by 9 feet (2.74 m) and powered at least two pairs of millstones.

=== Swaisland's Printing Works, Crayford ===
TQ 517 748
A print works was established by Charles Swaisland in 1812. Two waterwheel symbols were marked on Greenwood's 1821 map. A cast iron and wood low breast shot waterwheel of about 10 feet (3.05 m) by 6 feet (1.83 m) was removed around 1948. It drove wooden drums for fabric washing. A second waterwheel was in existence in 1893.

=== Calico Mill ===
TQ 524 749
This mill stood where Watling Street crossed the Cray. In the 18th century it processed calico. It was marked on Greenwood's 1821 map as Calico Mills.

=== Lower (Iron) Mill, Crayford ===
TQ 528 755
This was the site of a plating mill built in the 16th century. It was in existence by 1570. It was still used as a flatting mill in the early 18th century, when it was owned by Lady Shovell. It was known as Crayford Iron Mill in 1800. It had a breastshot waterwheel. In 1817, it was replaced by Crayford Flour Mills.

=== Crayford Saw Mill ===
TQ 528 755
This was a saw mill powered by a breast shot waterwheel. It partnered Crayford Iron Mill from 1765. The timber for the floor of Buckingham Palace was produced here. The saw mill stood alongside Crayford flour Mill; it was standing in 1854.

=== Crayford Flour Mills ===
TQ 528 755
Crayford Flour Mills were built in 1817. They were powered by a cast iron low breast shot waterwheel 28 feet (8.53 m) by 4 feet 6 inches (1.37 m) and drove five pairs of French Burr millstones. The upright shaft was wooden, with a cast iron wallower. The waterwheel and machinery were scrapped in 1914, when roller milling plant was installed, driven by gas engines.
