= Waring baronets =

Baronetcy in the Baronetage of the United Kingdom

There have been two baronetcies created for persons with the surname Waring, both in the Baronetage of the United Kingdom. One creation is extinct while one is still extant.

The Waring Baronetcy, of Foots Cray Place in the County of Kent, was created in the Baronetage of the United Kingdom on 31 May 1919. For more information on this creation, see Samuel Waring, 1st Baron Waring.

The Waring Baronetcy, of St Bartholomew's in the City of London, was created in the Baronetage of the United Kingdom on 29 January 1935 for the surgeon Holburt Jacob Waring. He was Governor of the Imperial College of Science and Technology from 1930 to 1947 and President of the Royal College of Surgeons from 1932 to 1935.

== Waring baronets, of Foots Cray Place (1919) ==
Escutcheon of the Waring baronets of Foots Cray Place

- See Samuel Waring, 1st Baron Waring

== Waring baronets, of St Bartholomew's (1935) ==
Escutcheon of the Waring baronets of St Bartholomew's

- Sir Holburt Jacob Waring, 1st Baronet (1866–1953)
- Sir (Alfred) Harold Waring, 2nd Baronet (1902–1981)
- Sir (Alfred) Holburt Waring, 3rd Baronet (1933–2021)
- Sir Michael Holburt Waring, 4th Baronet (born 1964)

The heir apparent is the present holder's son Oliver Holburt Waring (born 1995).
