= Walker baronets of Oakley House (1856) =

The Walker baronetcy, of Oakley House in the County of Suffolk was created in the Baronetage of the United Kingdom on 19 July 1856 for Baldwin Wake Walker, a naval surveyor. He was a grandson of Capt. Drury Wake, third son of Sir William Wake, 7th Baronet.

== Walker baronets, of Oakley House (1856) ==
- Sir Baldwin Wake Walker, 1st Baronet (1802–1876)
- Sir Baldwin Wake Walker, 2nd Baronet (1846–1905)
- Sir Francis Elliot Walker, 3rd Baronet (1851–1928)
- Sir Baldwin Patrick Walker, 4th Baronet (1924–2005)
- Sir Christopher Robert Baldwin Walker, 5th Baronet (born 25 October 1969)
