= Walsh baronets of Little Ireland (1645) =

The Walsh Baronetcy, of Little Ireland in the County of Waterford, was created in the Baronetage of Ireland in July 1645 for James Walsh, a former Member of the Irish parliament for Waterford City. The title became extinct on the death of the second Baronet, circa 1690.

== Walsh baronets, of Little Ireland (1645) ==
- Sir James Walsh, 1st Baronet (c. 1580–c. 1650)
- Sir Robert Walsh, 2nd Baronet (died c. 1690)
