= John Walsham (theologian) =

John Walsham (or John of Walsham) was an English Franciscan theologian and philosopher. Born at Walsham, John obtained a doctorate in theology from the University of Cambridge. He became the lector at the Franciscan studium in Cambridge and around 1350 became the lector at their studium in Norwich. He was licensed to hear confessions in the diocese of Canterbury in 1358.

All of John's surviving works are found in a single manuscript, Oxford, Corpus Christi College, 182. It is a collection of nine questions that were disputed sometime between 1344 and 1349. John takes the position, rare for his time, that there are valid a posteriori arguments for the existence of God, but none valid a priori. He distinguishes between the task of proving the existence of a first being and the more difficult one of proving the existence of a supremely and infinitely perfect being who created the universe. In dismissing a priori proofs, like that of Thomas Bradwardine, he refers to another work of his, which has not survived.
