= Foots Cray =

Area of south east London, England

Coordinates: 51.416°N 0.115°E

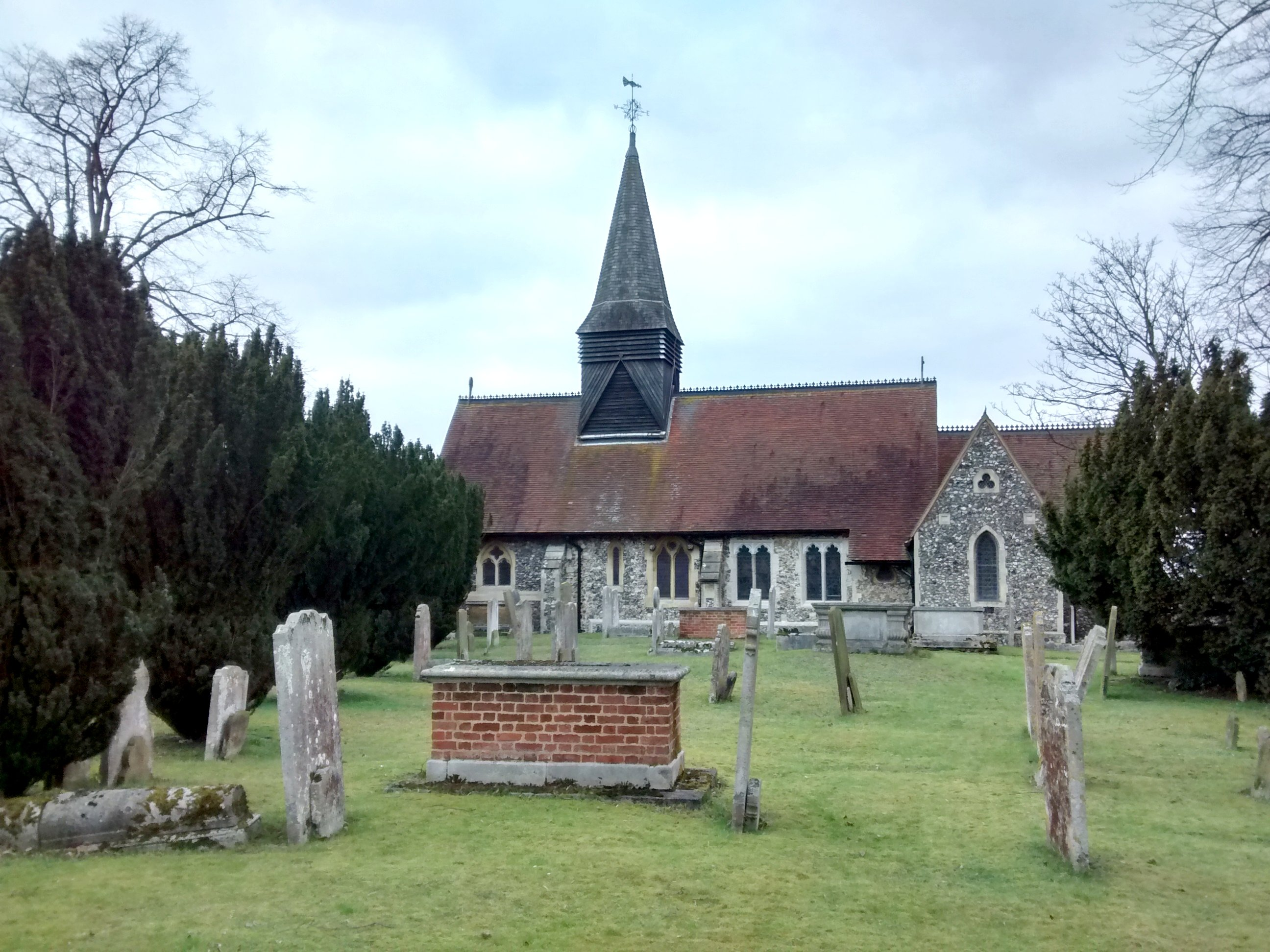
- All Saints Church

- Location within Greater London
- OS grid reference: TQ472709
- London borough: Bexley
- Ceremonial county: Greater London
- Region: London
- Country: England
- Sovereign state: United Kingdom
- Post town: SIDCUP
- Postcode district: DA14
- Dialling code: 020
- Police: Metropolitan
- Fire: London
- Ambulance: London
- UK Parliament: Old Bexley and Sidcup
- London Assembly: Bexley and Bromley

Foots Cray is an area of South East London, England, within the London Borough of Bexley. Prior to 1965 it was in the historic county of Kent. It is located south-east of Sidcup, north of Orpington and north west of Swanley.

== History ==
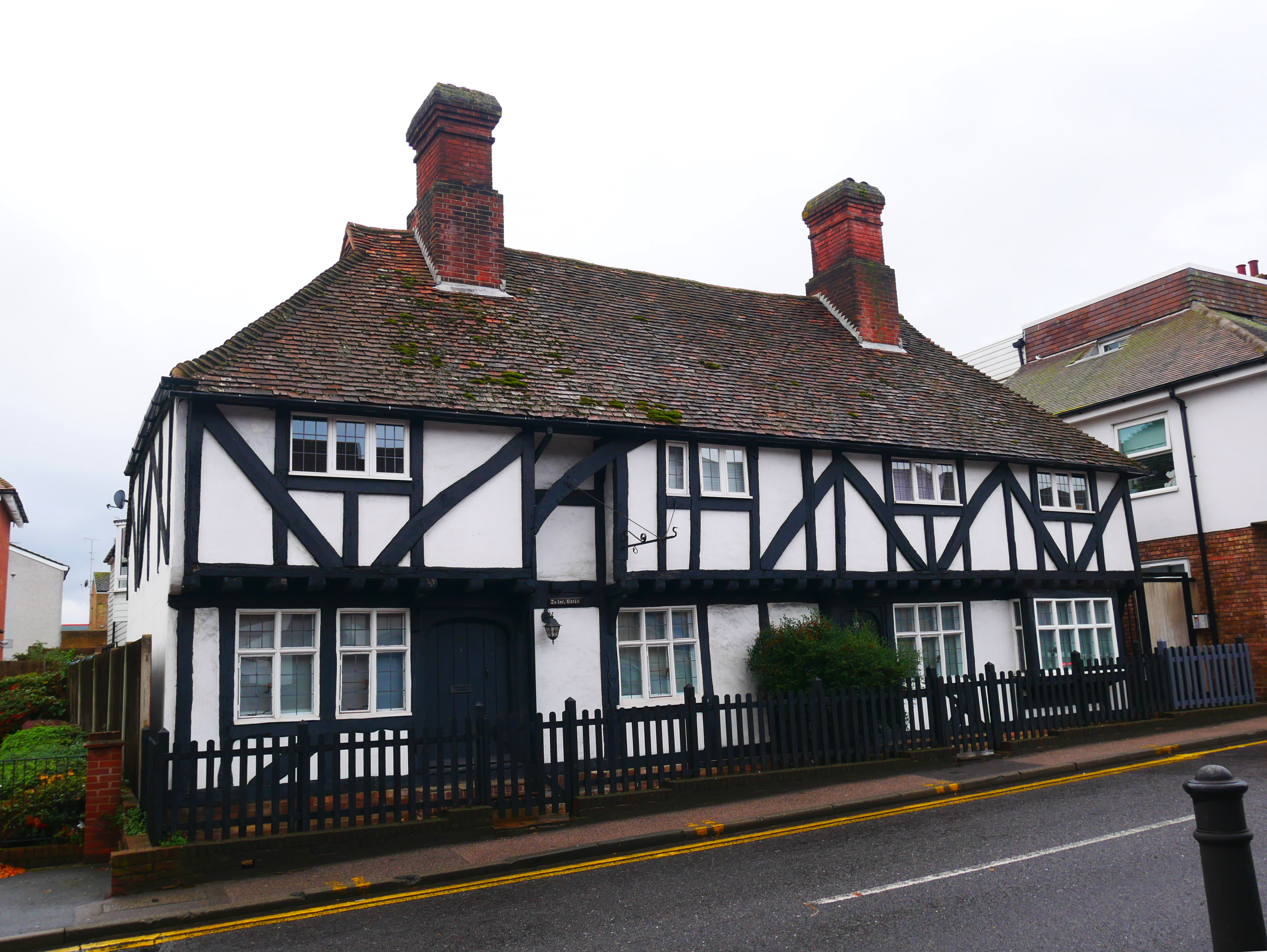
The late 15th or 16th-century Tudor Cottages in Foots Cray

It took its name from Godwin Fot, a local Saxon landowner recorded in Domesday Book of 1086, and from the River Cray that passes through the village. It lay on the old Maidstone Road (now bypassed by the A20 road) leading from London to north Kent. Until the 20th century, Foots Cray dominated the nearby, less ancient hill-top hamlet of Sidcup. The combined area was designated as the Urban District of Foots Cray in 1902. Soon, however, the two settlements' fortunes were reversed, as Foots Cray's traditional industries declined after the First World War, and Sidcup grew rapidly as a commuter town after a railway was built linking it to central London. In 1921 this change was reflected in the renaming of Foots Cray Urban District to Sidcup Urban District. In 1965 both areas became part of the London Borough of Bexley.

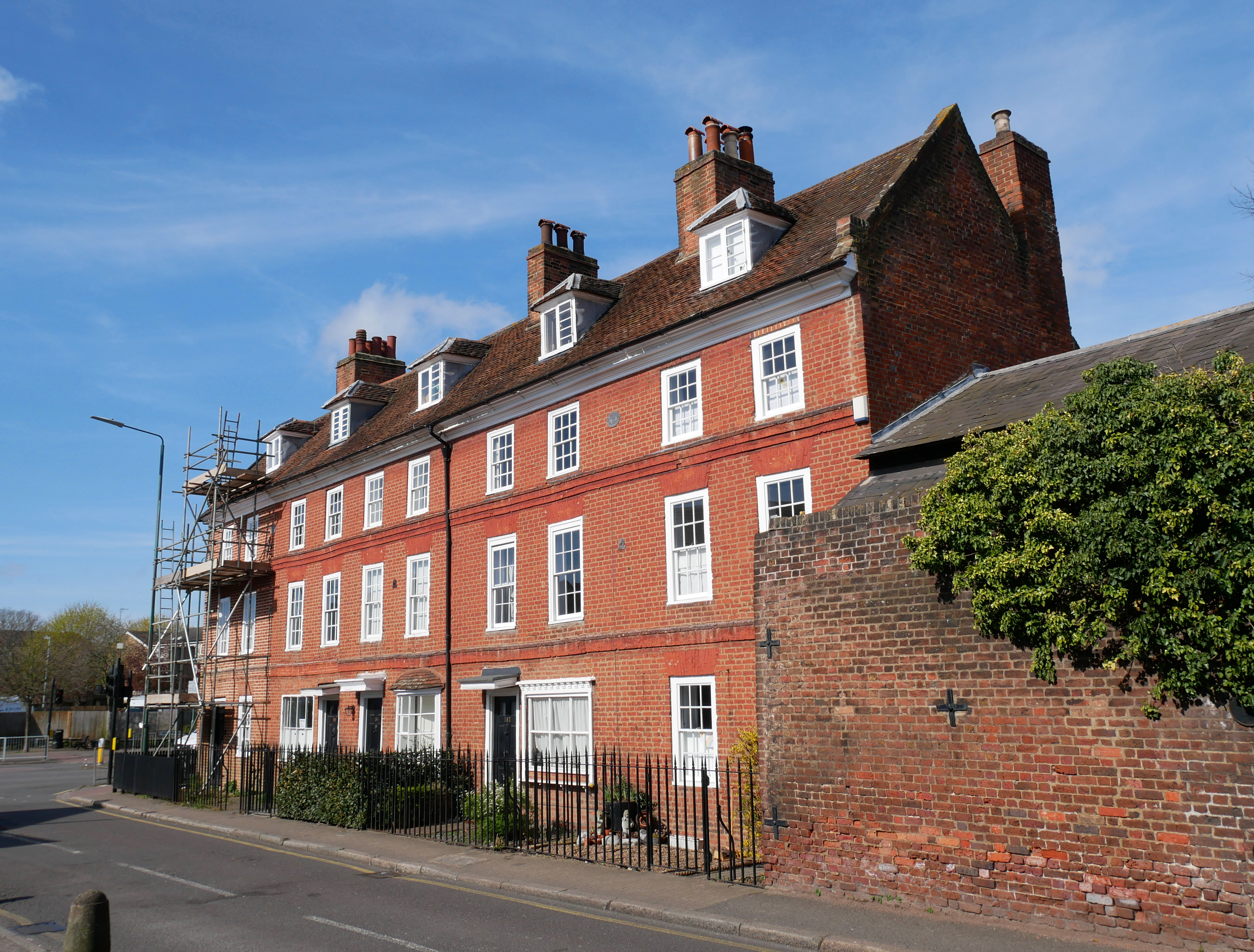
The 18th-century houses at 180–188 Rectory Lane, Foots Cray

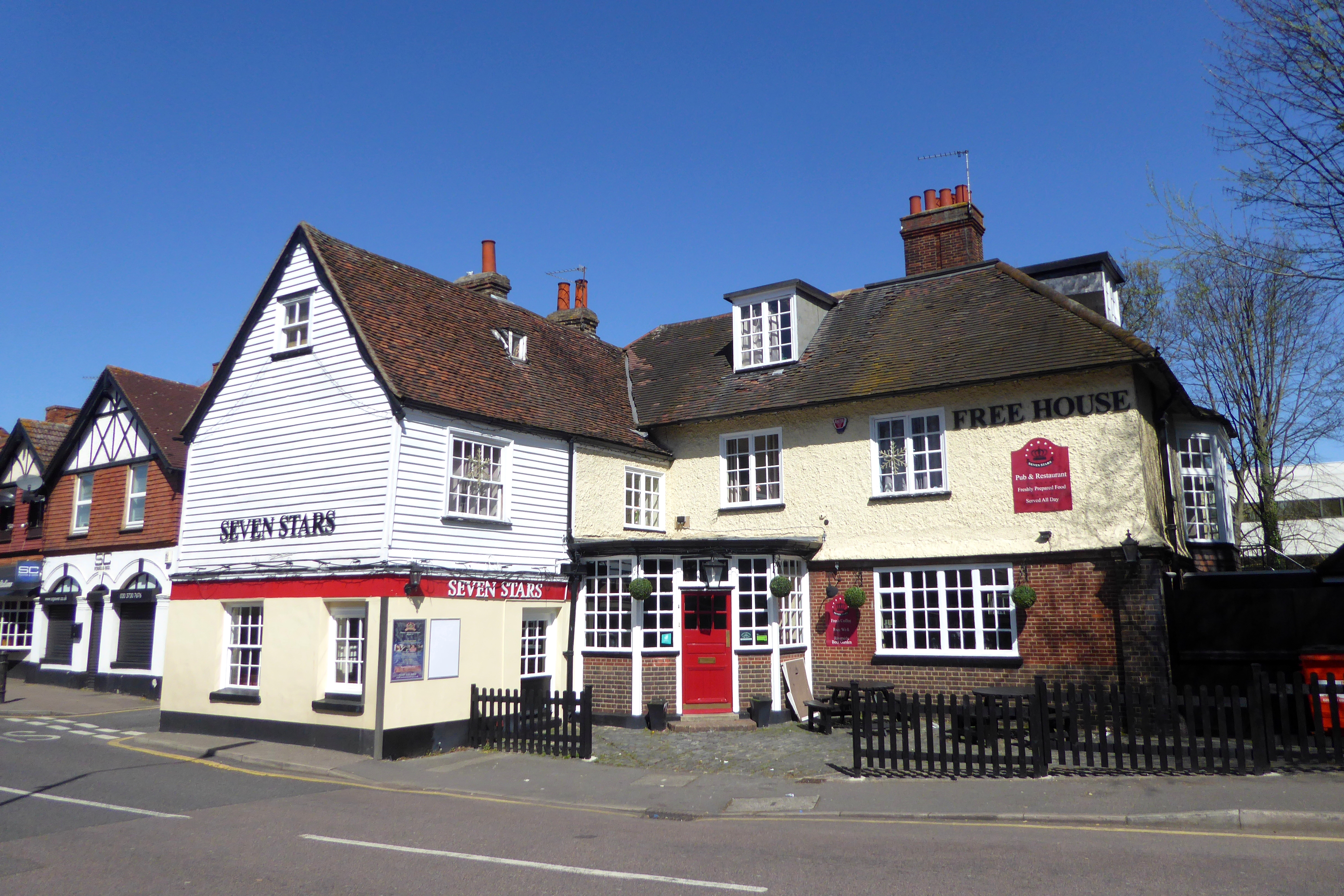
The Seven Stars, a Grade II-listed pub in Foots Cray, part of which is 16th-century

William Walsingham (died 1534), of Foots Cray, second son of James Walsingham, lord of the Manor of Scadbury in Chislehurst, Kent, was the father of Sir Francis Walsingham (c.1532-1590), Principal Secretary to Queen Elizabeth I, popularly remembered as her "spymaster".

The estate of Foots Cray Place was rebuilt about 1754 for Bourchier Cleeve, on the site of the manor, as a Palladian mansion that was attributed to Isaac Ware; it was illustrated in this form in Vitruvius Britannicus iv (1777, pls. 8–10). Foots Cray Place was remodelled for Benjamin Harenc (1792) by the minor London architect Henry Hakewill, who further remodelled it in 1823 for Nicholas Vansittart, 1st Baron Bexley, who was Chancellor of the Exchequer. Further works were carried out for Lord Bexley by another London architect of equally modest reputation, John William Hiort, who also built Bexley's London house in Great George Street, Westminster. After a fire in 1949, it was demolished in 1950. Now only the stable block remains, but the grounds, known as Foots Cray Meadows, provide a valuable public green space in this south-eastern suburb of London. This 89-hectare park was formed in the early 19th century from two mid-18th-century landscaped parks. It is listed by English Heritage as a Grade II historic park and is a Local Nature Reserve. The "London LOOP" walk passes through Foots Cray Meadows on its way from Old Bexley to Sidcup Place and Petts Wood. There is some industry in an area next to the meadows and bordering the river.

The naval wireless engineer and short-story writer F. G. Loring died at the Old House, Foot's Cray on 7 September 1951, aged eighty-two.

Foots Cray stable block and adjacent walled garden were placed on the English Heritage 'at risk' register but have now been rescued following redevelopment to form a luxury home that was for sale in 2008 at £3.5 million.

The town gave its name to Footscray, a major suburb in the inner west of the metropolitan area of Melbourne, Australia.

== Geography ==
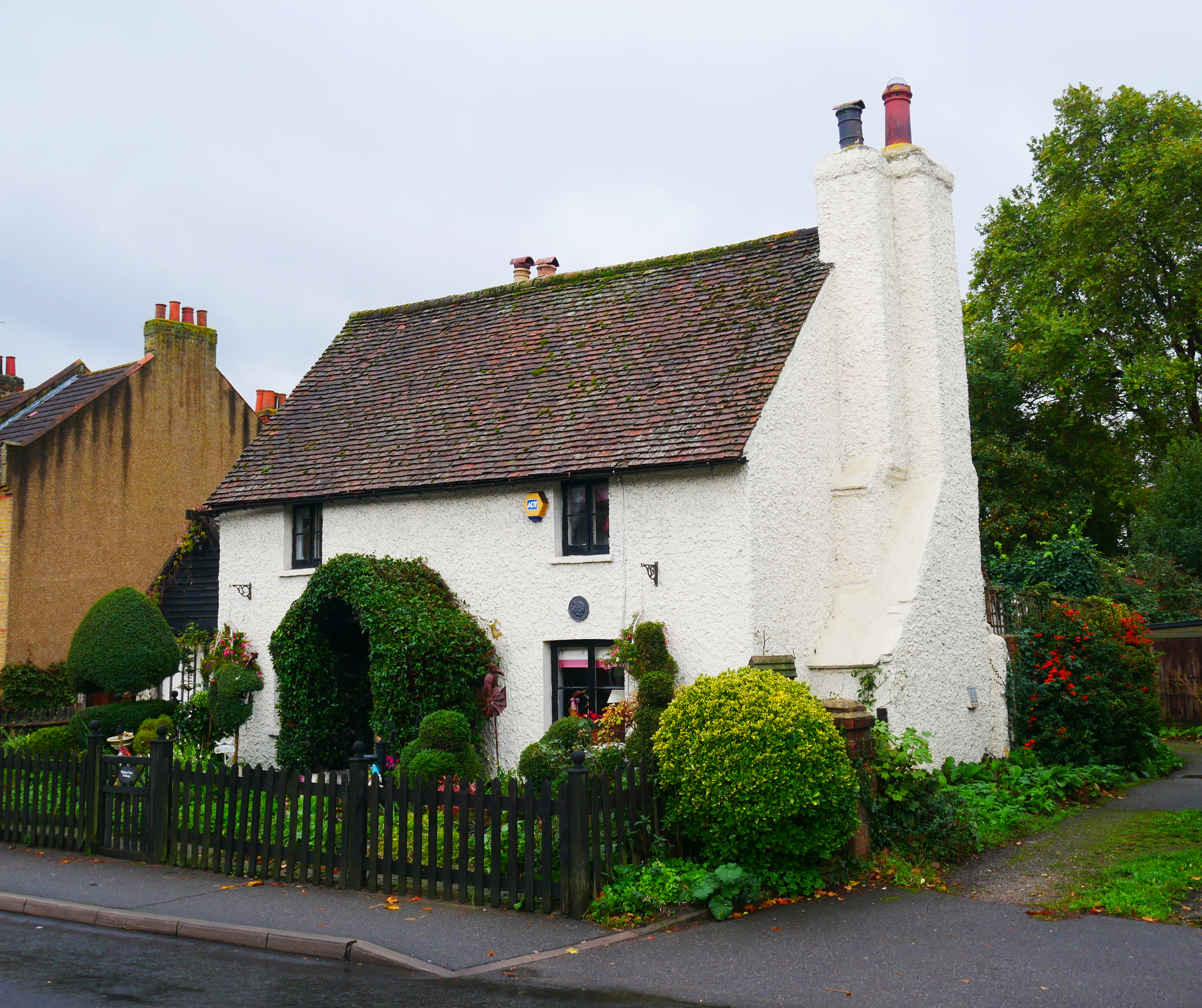
The 17th-century Walnut Tree Cottage in Foots Cray, a Grade II listed building

Foots Cray borders North Cray to the north and north east, Ruxley to the east and south east, St Paul's Cray to the south and south west and Sidcup to the west and north west.

== Church ==
Just to the north of the main crossroads, All Saints Church, Foots Cray, is situated in Rectory Lane on the edge of Foots Cray Meadows near the River Cray. The church was built in the 1330s but is believed to stand on the site of an earlier (possibly Saxon) church evidenced by the late 12th century Norman font. The church includes a mid-14th-century effigy, two 14th-century windows on the south side of the nave and in the chapel, and a brass plate recording the death of Thomas Myton, Rector of Foots Cray, in 1489. The west door-case and porch date from about 1500. In 1638 the church owned eight acres of land which included an orchard, garden and cowyard, a dwelling house, hovel, barn and stable.

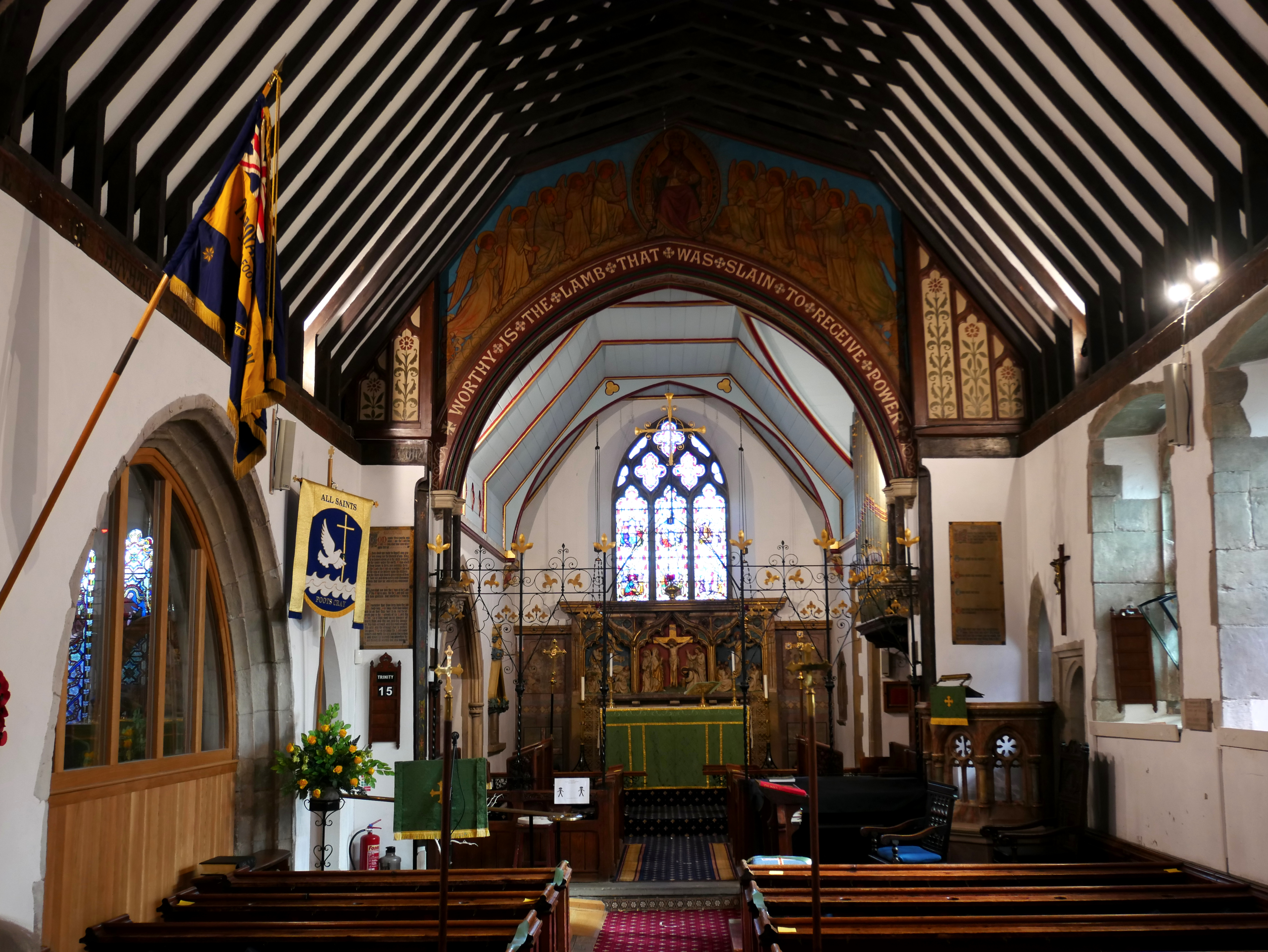
The nave of All Saints Church, facing east towards the chancel

In 1863 extensive alterations took place, including the removal of the old box pews, with the church being substantially rebuilt. The nave was extended westwards with the bell tower at the west end of the church left standing on four oak posts so that the bells are now rung from the centre of the aisle. During the enlargement and remodelling of the chancel, the remains of twenty burials were found, as was a brass plate engraved with the date 1440 which still had a bunch of lavender placed underneath it. The stained glass windows date from the second half of the 19th century as do the three bells, although the bells were recast in 1987. In 1995-97 major roof repairs took place to the nave, chancel, chapel and vestry at a cost of nearly £70,000.

The original parish registers dating back to 1559 were stolen in 1948 when vandals broke into the church and threw the church records into the River Cray, but copies of the register from 1559 to 1832 had been made.

The original churchyard was extended in 1876 courtesy of a donation of one acre of land by Robert Arnold Vansittart, and again in 1885. The churchyard includes an unusual iron stone grave slab which marked the burial of Martin Manning 'Yeoman' in 1656 (although the inscription is no longer legible). The granite Sir John Pender monument was blown over in the hurricane of October 1987 despite its great weight and later re-erected by the Pender family and Sir John's old company Cable & Wireless plc.

In 1996 when contractors were cleaning out the void just above the walls around the nave, they found a Daily Express newspaper dated 29 October 1957 in an envelope signed by the seven workmen who had been installing a gas-fired boiler.

== Transport ==
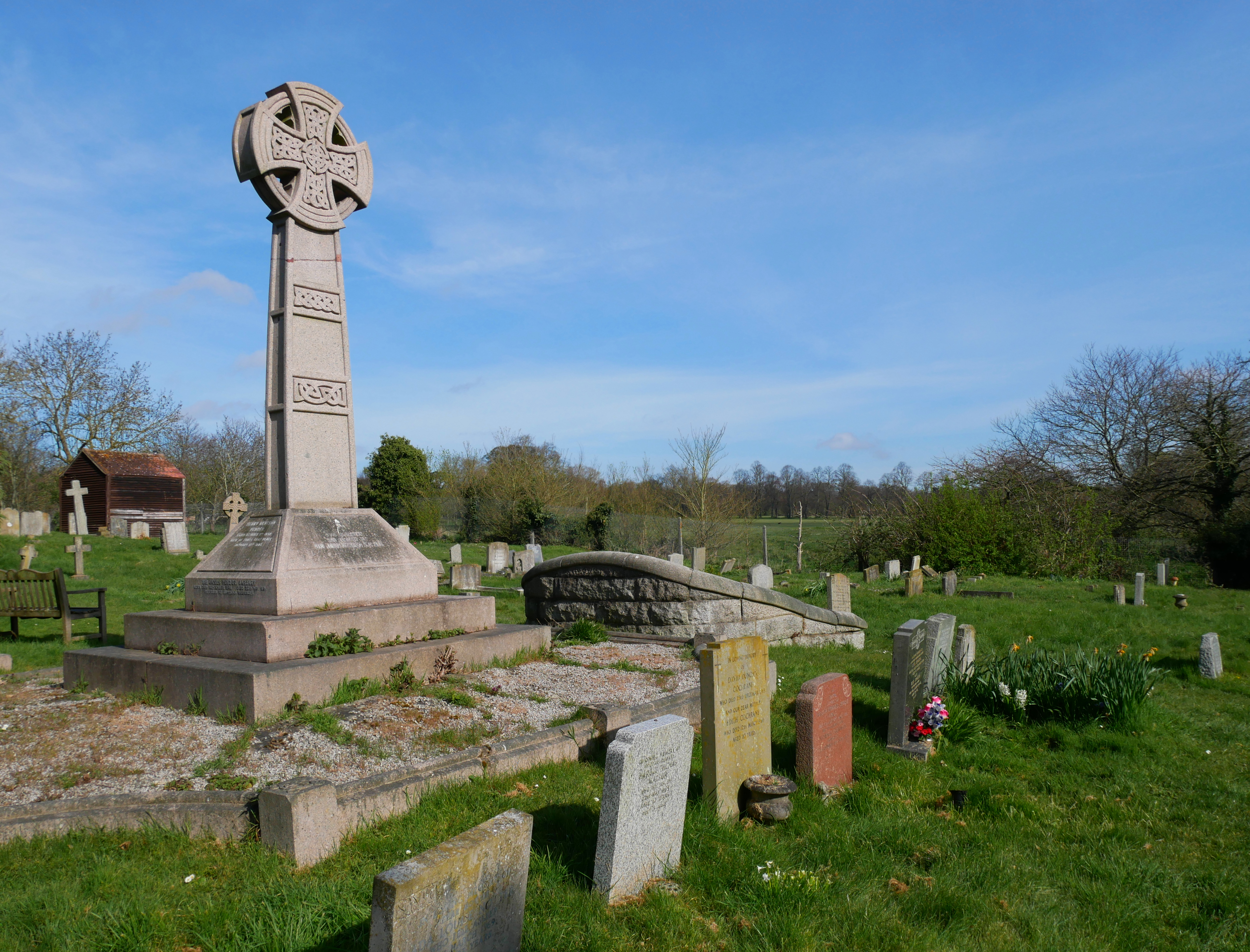
The memorial to John Pender in the churchyard around All Saints Church

=== Buses ===
Foots Cray is served by 5 London Buses routes.

- 51 to Orpington via St Paul's Cray & St Mary Cray and to Woolwich via Sidcup, Blackfen, Welling & Plumstead Common.
- 233 to Eltham via Sidcup & New Eltham and to Swanley via Ruxley.
- 321 to New Cross Gate via Sidcup, New Eltham, Eltham, Eltham Green, Lee Green & Lewisham (24 hours).
- 492 to Bluewater via Ruxley Corner, North Cray, Bexley, Bexleyheath, Crayford, Dartford, Stone & Greenhithe and to Sidcup.
- R11 to Green Street Green via St Paul's Cray, St Mary Cray & Orpington and to Queen Mary's Hospital, Sidcup via Sidcup High Street.

=== Rail ===
The nearest National Rail stations to Foots Cray are Sidcup and St Mary Cray.

== Industry and commerce ==
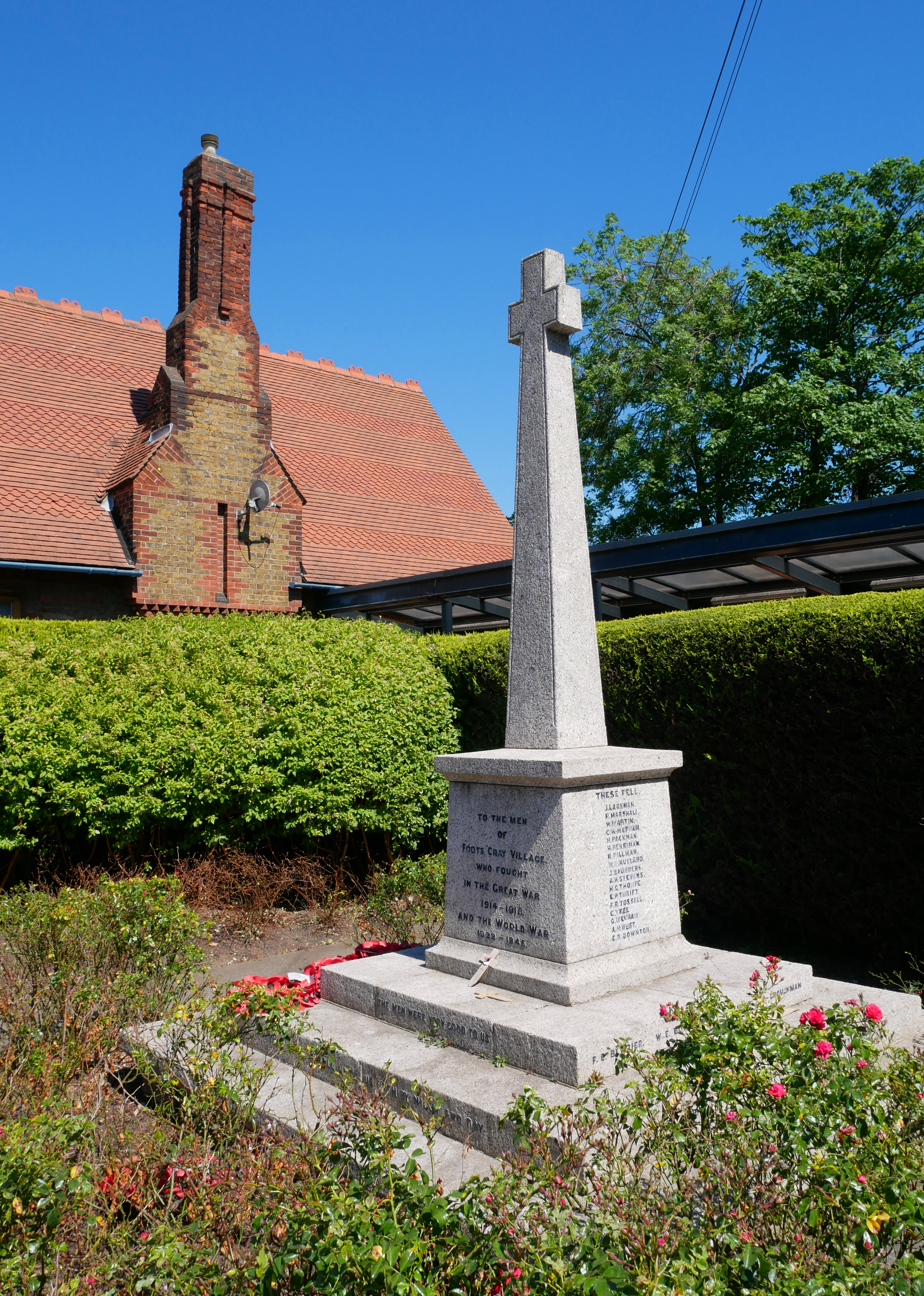
The Foots Cray war memorial in Rectory Lane

The Coca-Cola Company has a large manufacturing and bottling plant in Foots Cray which opened in 1961 and employs 361 people. This plant was where Dasani water was produced.

Kolster-Brandes was a manufacturer of radio and television sets that moved to Foots Cray in 1928. The company was later acquired by ITT. The Kolster-Brandes company rugby team, which was formed in 1967, is now called Foots Cray RUFC and competes to this day. The team's badge incorporates the STC letters which represent Standard Telephones and Cables, the company which took over the Kolster Brands business.

Fujitsu had a call centre and software development offices on the site of the former Kolster-Brandes factory which closed in 2009.

Richard Klinger Group, an Austrian company which made engine gaskets, hydraulic pipelines and water level gauges and valves, had a factory built in 1937 fronting Edgington Way in a Modernist architectural style. This Klinger factory, later bought by French company Trouvey Cauvin, closed in the 1990s and was severely damaged by fire in 2013. The main and flank facades were retained when the building was converted for self-storage use during 2018/19 when the exterior clock was restored.

The Robert Greig foodstore near the village centre was modified as a Lidl supermarket in the early 1990s and traded until 16 January 2022, when it was superseded by a purpose-built supermarket on Sevenoaks Way, in St. Mary Cray to the south.

== Sport ==
A small short lived greyhound racing track was opened during the mid-1930s in the area. The exact location is unknown but according to the 1934 Kelly's Directory was located on the Sidcup Hill side of Foots Cray. The racing was independent (not affiliated to the sports governing body, the National Greyhound Racing Club) and was known as a flapping track, which was the nickname given to independent tracks.

In 1977, Foots Cray Lions football club was established, with one team entering the local league. The club's matches are played at Baugh Road in Foots Cray. The club has male and female adult and junior teams. In 2016 Foots Cray Lions were voted Charter Standard Development Club of the Year by the Football Association.
