= Walker baronets of Bushey Hall (1680) =

Escutcheon of the Walker baronets of Bushey Hall

The Walker baronetcy, of Bushey Hall in the County of Hertfordshire, was created in the Baronetage of England on 28 January 1680 for George Walker. He was the son of the courtier Sir Walter Walker, of the staff of Catherine of Braganza. George Walker lost his fortune and died in the King's Bench Prison in 1690. After the death of his son, the 2nd Baronet, in 1703, the baronetcy became extinct.

== Walker baronets, of Bushey Hall (1680) ==
- Sir George Walker, 1st Baronet (c. 1643–1690)
- Sir Walter Walker, 2nd Baronet (c. 1682–1703)
