= Joseph Massie (economist) =

Joseph Massie (died 1 November 1784) was an 18th-century English political economist and writer on trade and finance. He is known for authoring around 15 pamphlets on various economic and financial topics, contributing to the development of political economy before the seminal works of Adam Smith. While his influence was less prominent compared to contemporaries such as James Denham-Steuart and Josiah Tucker, Massie made notable contributions by combining his deep knowledge of historical economic literature with a focus on the economic challenges of his time.

Massie united a profound understanding of the economic writings of the 16th and 17th centuries with a keen interest in addressing the pressing economic issues of the 18th century. He formed an extensive collection of over 1,500 economic treatises, dating from 1557 to 1763, which he used as a foundation for his analysis. The catalogue of his collection, dated 1764, is preserved as Lansdowne MS. 1049 in the British Museum and provides valuable insights into economic bibliography.

Massie's writings sought to establish "commercial knowledge upon fixed principles." He devoted much of his time to compiling detailed statistics, which challenged contemporary fears of a decline in British trade. His work illustrated the steady growth and distribution of British industries and commerce during the mid-18th century. However, his tendency to judge the events of his own time through the lens of historical precedents occasionally limited his perspective.

Massie addressed topics such as urbanization, commerce, and public finance, with a particular focus on the problem of government debt during the Seven Years' War. Despite his efforts, his ideas and proposals met with little support from either the public or the statesmen to whom he dedicated his works. Consequently, he ceased publishing approximately 20 years before his death.

Massie died in Holborn, London, on 1 November 1784. His contributions to economic thought, while sometimes overlooked, remain significant for their effort to blend historical knowledge with contemporary analysis. His death was noted in the Gentleman's Magazine.
