= Walker baronets of Sand Hutton (1868) =

Escutcheon of the Walker baronets of Sand Hutton

The Walker baronetcy, of Sand Hutton in the County of Yorkshire, was created in the Baronetage of the United Kingdom on 9 December 1868 for James Walker, Sheriff of Yorkshire in 1846. The 2nd Baronet, his son, was a Member of Parliament for Beverley from 1859 to 1865.

== Walker baronets, of Sand Hutton (1868) ==
- Sir James Walker, 1st Baronet (1803–1883)
- Sir James Robert Walker, 2nd Baronet (1829–1899)
- Sir James Heron Walker, 3rd Baronet (1865–1900)
- Sir Robert James Milo Walker, 4th Baronet (1890–1930)
- Sir James Heron Walker, 5th Baronet (1914–2003)
- Sir Victor Stewart Heron Walker, 6th Baronet (born 8 October 1942)

The heir apparent is the present holder's son James Frederick Heron Walker (born 1970).
