= Walsingham (surname) =

Walsingham is a surname. Notable people with the surname include:

- Thomas Walsingham, (died c. 1422) an English chronicler
- Robert Walsingham (shipwright), coxswain of the Sea Venture and shipwright of the Patience
- Thomas Walsingham (literary patron), a patron of Christopher Marlowe
- Thomas de Grey, 6th Baron Walsingham (1843–1919), British politician and amateur entomologist
- Francis Walsingham, (1532–1590) the spymaster of Queen Elizabeth I of England
- Robert Walsingham (pirate), 17th-century Anglo-Turkish English pirate
- Robert Boyle-Walsingham (1736–1780), also known as Robert Walsingham, English politician, MP for Fowey and Knaresborough
- Any of the Barons Walsingham
- Melusina von der Schulenburg, Countess of Walsingham, an illegitimate daughter of King George I of Great Britain and Ehrengard Melusine von der Schulenburg, Duchess of Kendal and Munster
- Edmund Walsingham (c. 1480 – 1550), Lieutenant of the Tower of London during the reign of King Henry VIII
