= White-Todd baronets =

Extinct baronetcy in the Baronetage of the United Kingdom

Sir Joseph White Todd
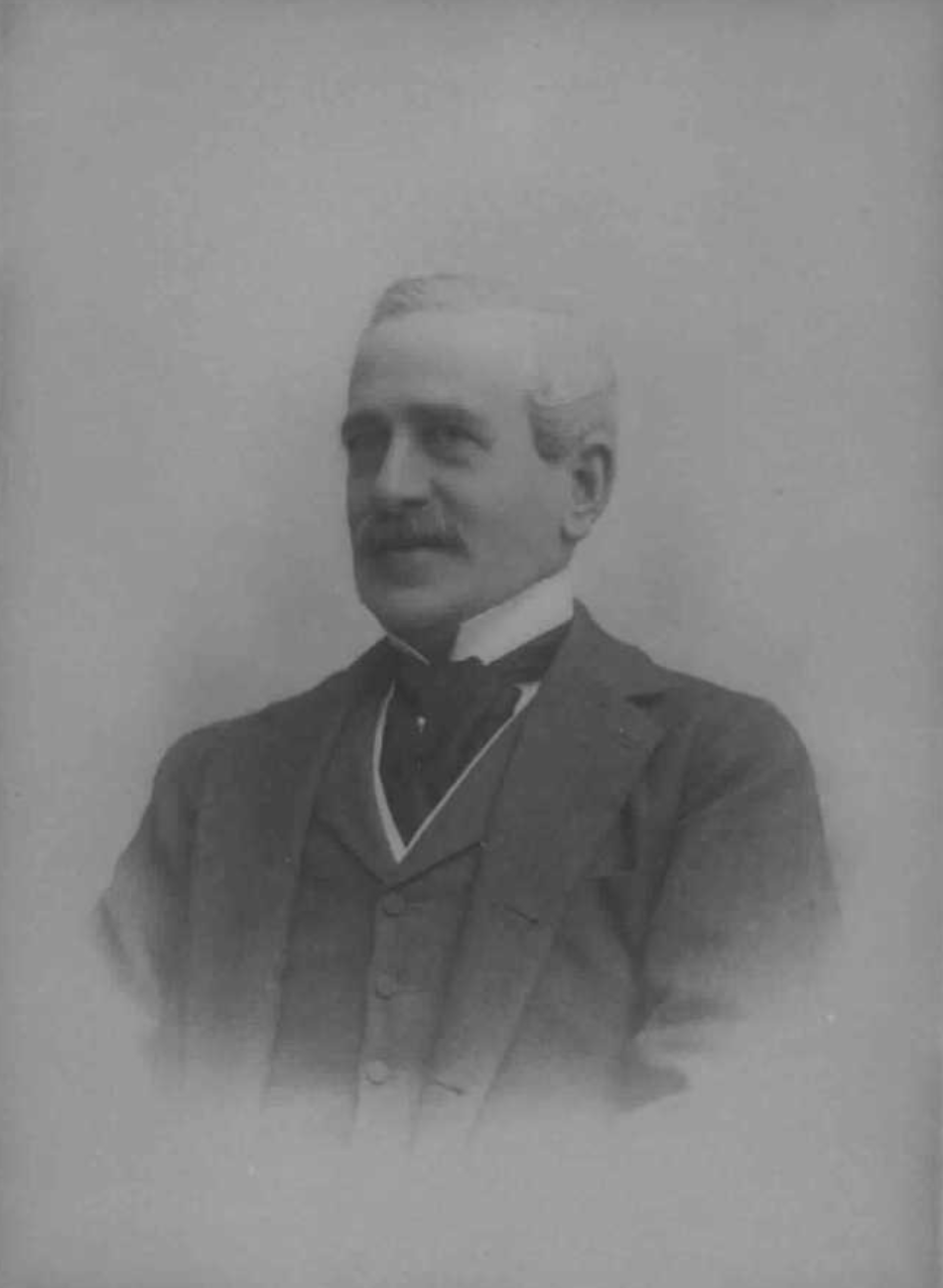
- Born: June 23, 1846; Lennoxtown, Stirlingshire, Scotland
- Died: February 19, 1926 (aged 79); Hanover Square, London, England

The White-Todd Baronetcy, of Eaton Place in the City of Westminster, was a title in the Baronetage of the United Kingdom. It was created on 20 June 1913 for Joseph White-Todd, a wealthy merchant banker and Chairman of the Phoenix Assurance Company. He was the founder and benefactor of the Havana Yacht Club, a director of the Callander, Oban, Central Argentine, and Buenos Aires Western Railways, and was decorated with the Grand Cross of the Spanish Order of Civil Merit (Orden del Mérito Civil). The title became extinct on his death in 1926.

== White-Todd baronets, of Eaton Place (1913) ==
- Sir Joseph White-Todd, 1st Baronet (1846–1926)

Coat of arms of White-Todd of Eaton Place
| Crest 1st, upon a rock a chamois statant, both Proper (Todd); upon a rudder fessewise Or, an albatross close Proper (White). Escutcheon Quarterly, 1st and 4th: Argent, a chamois salient Proper between in chief two fylfots Gules (Todd); 2nd and 3rd: per fesse wavy Azure and barry wavy of four Argent and of the first in chief an albatross volant Proper (White) Motto By industry and perseverance |
