= Avery Hill =

Coordinates: 51.451434°N 0.076128°E

- Area
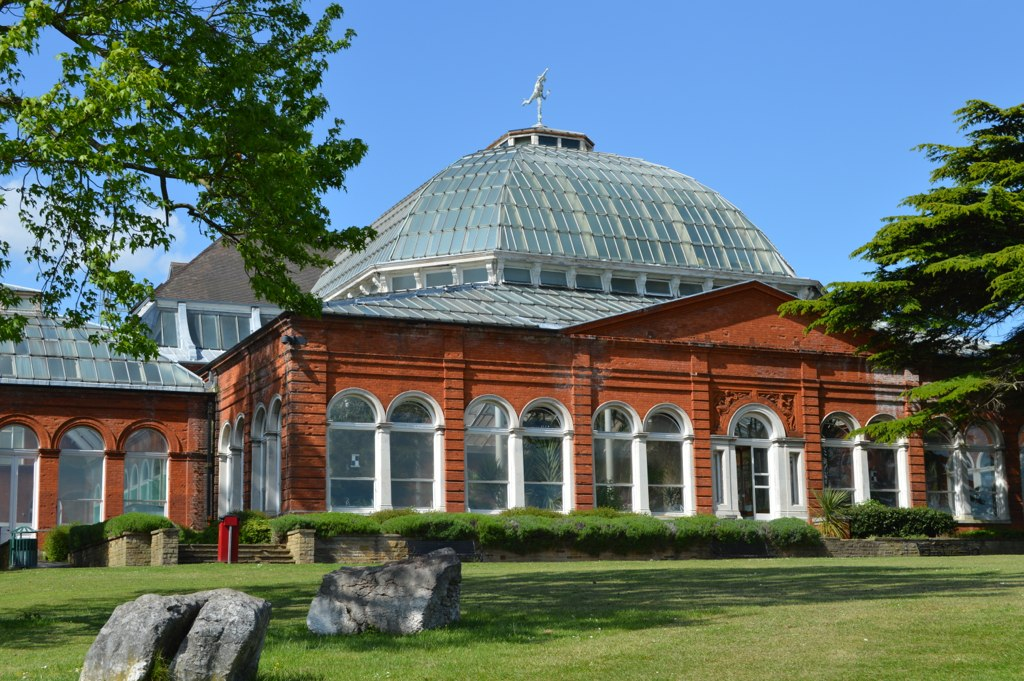
- Avery Hill Park hothouse

- Location within Greater London
- London borough: Greenwich; Bexley
- Ceremonial county: Greater London
- Region: London
- Country: England
- Sovereign state: United Kingdom
- Post town: LONDON
- Postcode district: SE9
- Post town: SIDCUP
- Postcode district: DA15
- Dialling code: 020
- Police: Metropolitan
- Fire: London
- Ambulance: London
- UK Parliament: Eltham and Chislehurst
- London Assembly: Greenwich and Lewisham; Bexley and Bromley

Avery Hill is an area of South East London mainly within Royal Borough of Greenwich, and with some parts in the London Borough of Bexley. It is located east of Eltham and north west of Sidcup. It is believed that the area is named after an aviary formerly located in the area.

== Avery Hill House ==
Avery Hill House was a palatial dwelling built by John Thomas North (1842–1896), who had made his fortune in the sodium nitrate trade in Chile.

Following North's death the house was acquired by the London County Council in July 1902 and its grounds extended to create Avery Hill Park in 1903. In 1906 North's house became Avery Hill College of Education, later incorporating two neighbouring buildings. Within a year of its foundation, the residential college had become the largest of LCC's training colleges and was frequently oversubscribed; in 79 years it trained over 15,000 teachers. In 1985 the college merged with Thames Polytechnic, renamed the University of Greenwich in 1993. As well as the original house (Mansion site), the university had extensive facilities at the nearby Southwood site.

In 2020 the university vacated the Mansion site at Avery Hill, while remaining on the Southwood site. A Harris Academy boys’ secondary school is planned to open on the Mansion site in 2026.

=== Winter Garden ===
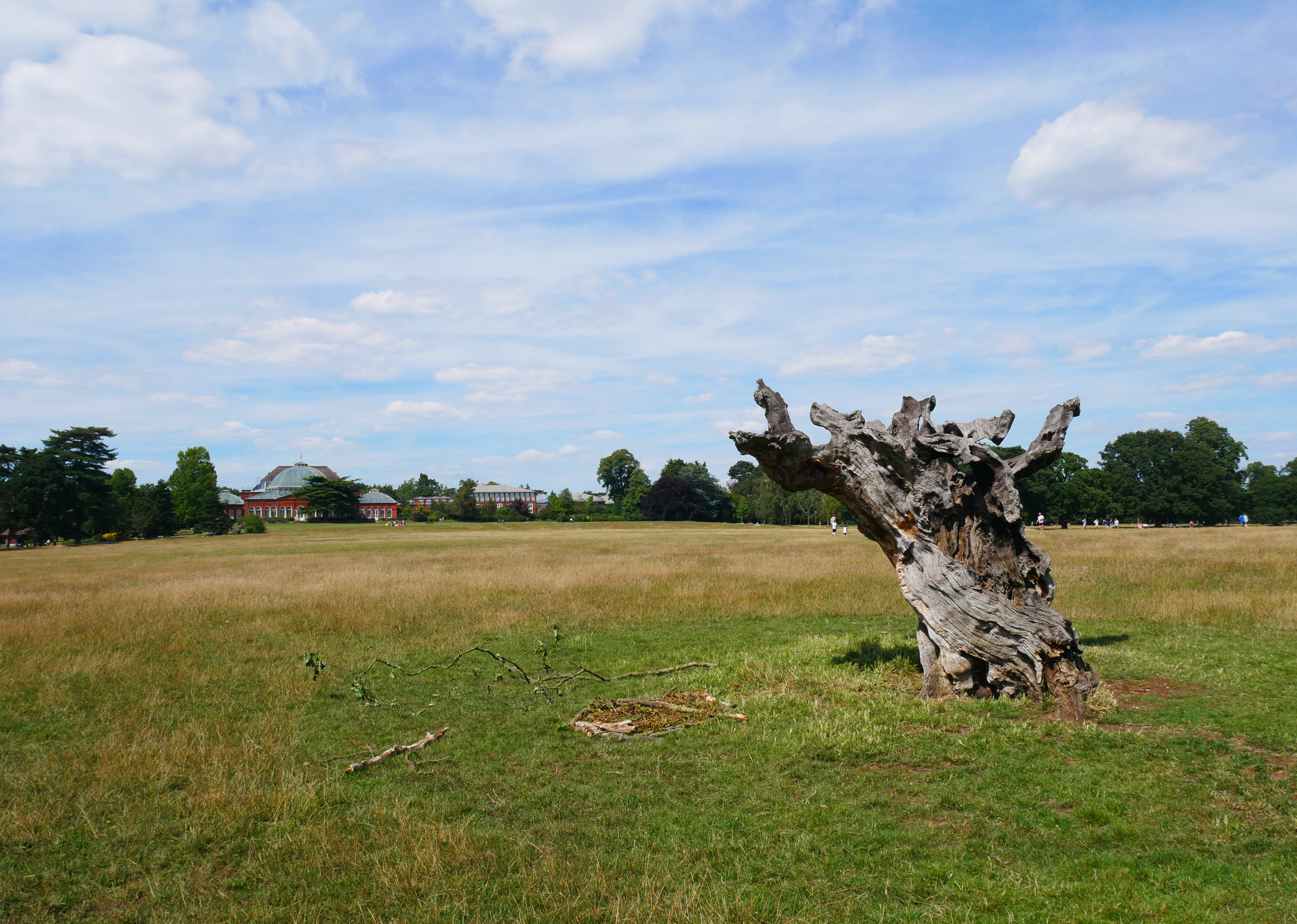
Avery Hill Park, with the conservatory to the north

The house is notable for an indoor winter garden, the second largest Victorian glasshouse in the UK after Kew Gardens' Temperate House. It forms part of one of the most extensive and expensive garden arrangements ever constructed as part of a private house in England. In the early 21st century, the Winter Garden fell into neglect, but is now open to the public after restoration work.

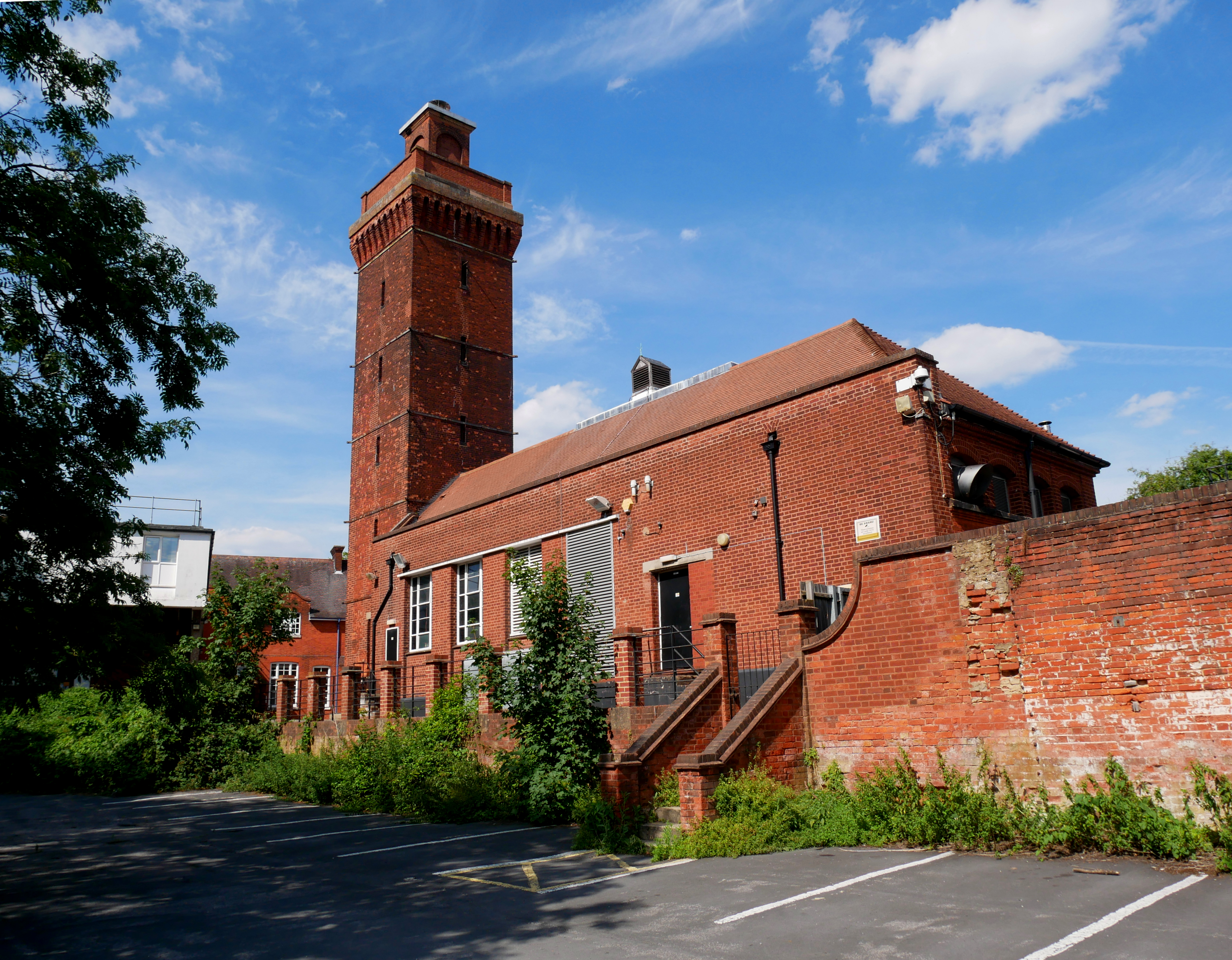
The University of Greenwich Student Union Building in Avery Hill

== Avery Hill Park ==
Avery Hill Park is a public park. Since 2010, the park has hosted a Parkrun on Saturdays. Originally 'Greenwich parkrun', the borough's first parkrun, it was renamed 'Avery Hill parkrun' in March 2025.

== Transport ==
=== Rail ===
The closest National Rail stations to Avery Hill are Falconwood and New Eltham.

=== Buses ===
Avery Hill is served by the following TFL bus routes.

- 132 to Bexleyheath via Blackfen, Blendon & Bexley or to North Greenwich via Eltham & Kidbrooke
- 162 to Beckenham via New Eltham, Chislehurst, Bickley, Bromley & Park Langley or to Eltham
- 286 to Greenwich via Eltham, Kidbrooke, Blackheath & Westcombe Park or to Sidcup
- B13 to Bexleyheath via Blackfen & Blendon or to New Eltham
- B15 to Bexleyheath via Falconwood & Welling or to Horn Park via Eltham
- N21 to Bexleyheath via Blackfen, Blendon & Bexley or to Trafalgar Square via Eltham, Lee, Lewisham, New Cross, Old Kent Road, London Bridge & Cannon Street. Night service.

== Nearby areas ==
Avery Hill borders Falconwood to the north and north east, Blackfen to the east, Sidcup to the south east, New Eltham to the south and south west and Eltham to the west and north west.
