= A209 road =

Road in South-East London

Coordinates: 51.4848°N 0.1022°E

A209

Route information
- Length: 2 mi (3.2 km)

Major junctions
- North end: Plumstead
- A206 A207
- South end: Welling

Location
- Country: United Kingdom
- Constituent country: England

Road network
- Roads in the United Kingdom; Motorways; A and B road zones

The A209 road is a 2-mile (3.2 km) route in southeast London, England. It connects Plumstead in the north with Welling in the south, passing through East Wickham. It is known as Wickham Lane at the northern end in the Royal Borough of Greenwich and Upper Wickham Lane at the southern end in the London Borough of Bexley. The entire route is served by the London Buses route 96.

== Route ==
=== Greenwich ===
The northern section, within Greenwich, is known as Wickham Lane. It begins at 'Plumstead Corner', a junction with the A206 road Plumstead High Street. It passes into Bexley at Plumstead Cemetery and forms the boundary between Greenwich and Bexley for a short distance.

=== Bexley ===
Within Bexley it is known as Upper Wickham Lane. It ends at a junction with the A207 road at Welling Corner, after passing under the Bexleyheath Line.
