= Falconwood =

Coordinates: 51.4596°N 0.0953°E

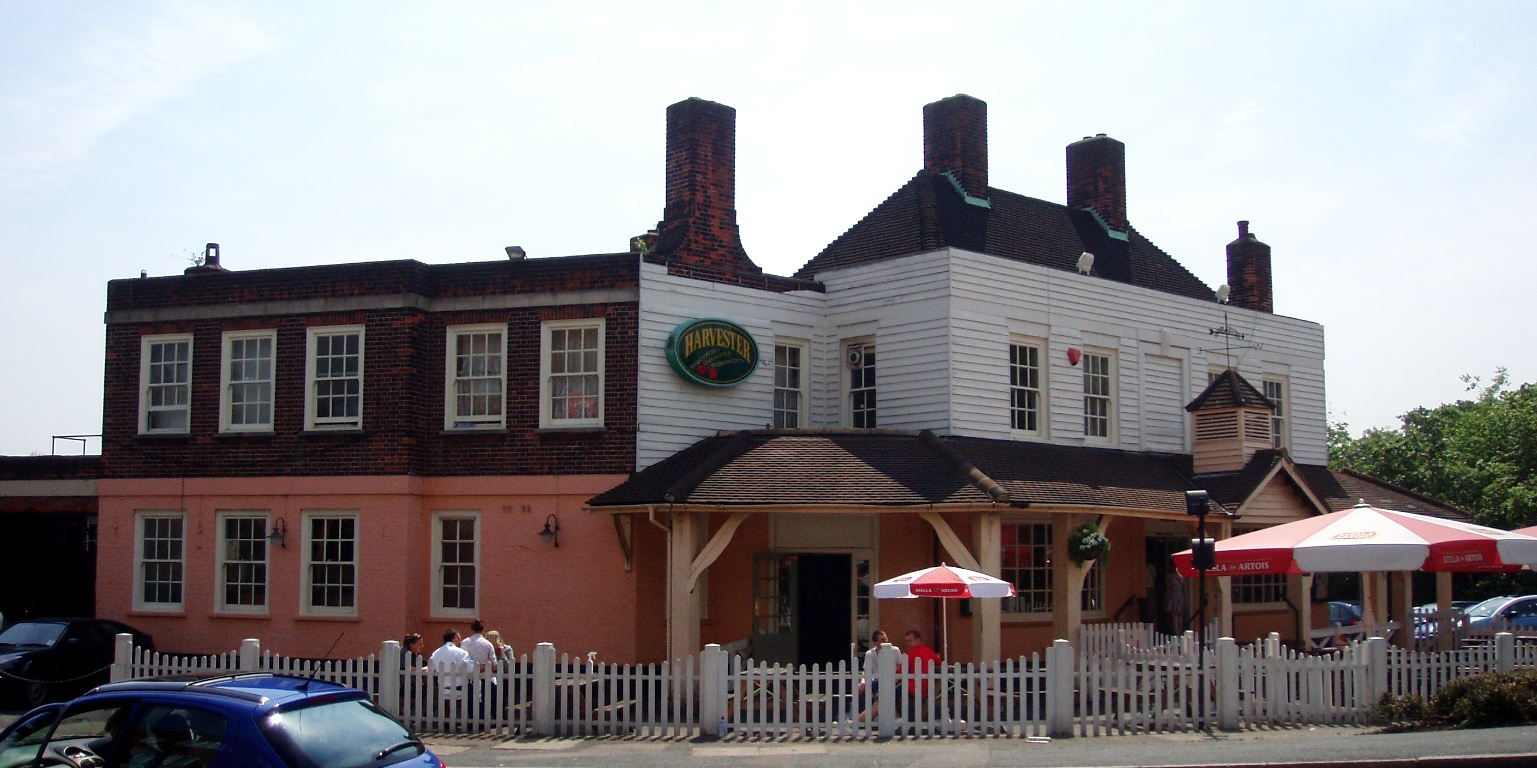

- Location within Greater London
- Population: 16,600 (2021 Census. Falconwood and Welling Ward 2021)
- OS grid reference: TQ455755
- London borough: Bexley; Greenwich
- Ceremonial county: Greater London
- Region: London
- Country: England
- Sovereign state: United Kingdom
- Post town: WELLING
- Postcode district: DA16
- Post town: LONDON
- Postcode district: SE9
- Dialling code: 020
- Police: Metropolitan
- Fire: London
- Ambulance: London
- UK Parliament: Eltham and Chislehurst Old Bexley and Sidcup
- London Assembly: Bexley and Bromley; Greenwich and Lewisham

Falconwood is an area of south east London within both the London Boroughs of Bexley and Greenwich. It is north east of Eltham and south west of Welling. According to the 2021 census, Falconwood, has a population of roughly 16,600 (Falconwood and Welling ward rounded to the nearest 100).

== The local area ==
Falconwood forms part of the Falconwood and Welling ward in the London Borough of Bexley, and borders the Eltham North and Eltham South wards in the Royal Borough of Greenwich.

Falconwood is served by one National Rail train station. Falconwood station which was opened in 1936, is served by Southeastern on the Bexleyheath Line. The station is situated in London fare zone 4.

The Green Chain walking network runs through Shepherdleas Wood, Oxleas Wood, Eltham Common, Eltham Park North and Eltham Park South. All these wooded and open areas are accessible via footpaths from Rochester Way, Welling Way and Riefield Road.

Falconwood Community Centre, next to Falconwood Park, was opened in 1954. The Falconwood Community Association meets here 5 times a week along with many other groups. The Falconwood and District Horticultural Society stages the Annual Fruit, Flower and Vegetable Show on the third Saturday in August.

In 2008 the Mayor of Bexley, Falconwood & Welling Councillor Nigel Betts, inaugurated the Community Centre as the local Children's Centre.

== The estate ==
The Falconwood Park Estate was designed and constructed by housing developers Ideal Homesteads in the 1930s. Situated between Welling and Eltham, the estate occupies the site of the former Westwood Farm.

Most of the estate is semi-detached and terraced houses, with bungalows scattered across the roads within the estate. There are flats above the shops on Lingfield Crescent and Falconwood Parade (The Green). There are 3/4 storey blocks of flats on Lingfield Crescent, at the corner of Rochester Way and Riefield Road, near the A2 and Eltham Cemetery & Crematorium. Maisonettes are on Millbrook Avenue.

== Politics and government ==
Falconwood is part of the Old Bexley and Sidcup constituency for elections to the House of Commons of the United Kingdom, currently represented by Louie French from the Conservative Party.

Falconwood is part of the Falconwood and Welling ward for elections to London Borough of Bexley.

== Education ==
See also London Borough of Bexley and Royal Borough of Greenwich education services.

- Bishop Ridley CofE Primary School (Entrance gates on Northumberland Avenue)
- Harris Academy Falconwood, formerly Westwood College (Entrance gates on The Green)
- Stationers' Crown Woods Academy (Entrance gates are on Bexley Road, Avery Hill)

Bishop Ridley CofE Primary School was formerly Westwood Primary School until Westwood Primary Schoolit became a Church of England school. Westwood Primary School was formed from two separate schools - Westwood Infant & Junior Schools in the late 1990s.

Harris Academy Falconwood (formerly Westwood Secondary School and later Westwood College) is an academy sponsored by the Harris Federation. The academy occupied the original secondary school and the old junior school buildings, but was replaced by a £27 million new school in 2011 built on some of the old playing fields.

Stationers' Crown Woods Academy (formerly Crown Woods School and later Crown Woods College) is an academy sponsored by the Worshipful Company of Stationers and Newspaper Makers. It is located in a £50million rebuilt school building and community learning facility that opened on 26 April 2011.

== Transport and location ==
=== Post code districts and London Borough Boundaries ===
Falconwood forms part of 2 London boroughs and 2 post codes. These being:

- Bexley - DA16 (part) - The rest of DA16 being formed by Welling and East Wickham.
- Greenwich - SE9 (part) - The rest of SE9 being formed by Eltham, New Eltham and Mottingham.

The SE9 roads in Bexley became part of LB Bexley under the 1994 boundary change. The Royal Mail have refused many attempts to change the postcode of these roads to DA16.

=== Rail ===
Falconwood station connects the area with National Rail services to London Victoria, London Cannon Street, Dartford and Woolwich Arsenal.

=== Buses ===
- B15 to Bexleyheath via Welling or to Horn Park via Eltham. Operated by London Central for London Buses.
- B16 to Bexleyheath via Welling or to Kidbrooke via Eltham. Operated by London Central for London Buses.

=== Main roads and access routes ===
Falconwood is a junction on the A2. London bound on the A2 will immediately lead to the A102 (Blackwall Tunnel Approach), and the Blackwall Tunnel under the River Thames to the A12 in East London, unless changing onto the old A2 at the Sun In The Sands junction (Blackheath). The London bound A2 isn't accessible directly from Falconwood. Access is from the Eltham junction with the South Circular (A205). The Kent bound A2 is accessible from Falconwood.

Rochester Way leads to Well Hall and Eltham town centre (continuing straight at the traffic lights junction with Welling Way). Turning right at the junction with Welling Way will lead to Shoulder of Mutton Green and Welling town centre. In the opposite direction, Rochester Way will lead to the dual carriageway Kent-bound A2, unless bearing right on Riefield Road. This leads to Avery Hill (a left turn at traffic lights), and Eltham town centre (a right turn at the lights).

Lingfield Crescent leads towards the Falconwood Park Estate, Falconwood Park and Welling town centre (turning left onto Millbrook Avenue).

=== Nearest facilities and shops ===
- Lingfield Crescent (Falconwood station shop parade).
- Falconwood Parade, The Green (surrounding Falconwood Park).
- Both Welling and Eltham town centres are also very easily accessible.

== Natural areas and open spaces ==
- Eltham Common (part)
- Eltham Park north
- Eltham Park south
- Falconwood Field
- Falconwood Park (The Green)
- Oxleas Meadow
- Oxleas Wood
- Shepherdleas Wood
