= Duwayne Brooks =

British politician (born 1974)

Duwayne Brooks OBE
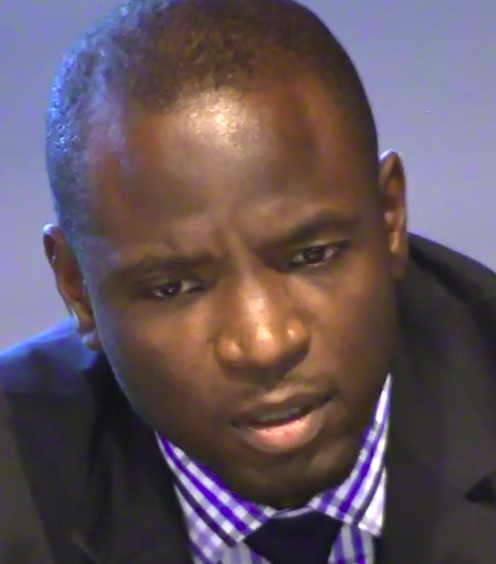

Councillor for Lewisham London Borough Council
- In office February 2009 – May 2014
- Ward: Downham

Personal details
- Born: 27 September 1974 (age 51) Lewisham, London, England
- Party: Conservatives (2018–present); Independent (2017–2018); Liberal Democrats (until 2017)
- Education: Woolwich College; Lewisham College

Duwayne Lloyd Anthony Brooks OBE (born 27 September 1974) is a British former politician who served as a councillor in the London Borough of Lewisham. He was a friend of Stephen Lawrence and was with him when he was murdered.

== Early life ==
Brooks was born in Lewisham to Jamaican parents. He grew up in Deptford and attended Blackheath Bluecoat Church of England School in Charlton. In 1991 he went to study engineering at Woolwich College and at Lewisham College a year later.

== Murder of Stephen Lawrence ==
Brooks was with his friend Stephen Lawrence when he was murdered on 22 April 1993, and experienced severe post-traumatic stress disorder as a result of the attack. He sought damages under the tort of negligence for his treatment by the police in the aftermath of the murder, as a suspect rather than a witness. This claim was rejected on the basis that case precedent, particularly the case of Hill v Chief Constable of West Yorkshire (1989) had not established that police should owe a duty of care to claimants impacted by their negligence. Although, unlike Hill, the police had harmed Brooks directly, rather than him being harmed by their lack of action, the police were not deemed liable for his psychiatric injuries. The murder led to an inquiry headed by Sir William Macpherson which concluded that the Metropolitan Police Force was "institutionally racist".

Brooks was arrested after allegations that he was involved in an incident during an anti-racist march outside the British National Party headquarters in Welling days after the murder. Although Brooks was charged, the judge dismissed the case against him. It was later revealed that the Special Demonstration Squad had been set to discover any incriminating details about members of the Justice for Stephen Lawrence campaign, including his parents and friends. The allegations against Brooks subsequently appeared. Brooks sued the Metropolitan Police in 2006, winning £100,000 in compensation.

== Political career ==
In February 2009, Brooks became a councillor for the Liberal Democrats in the London Borough of Lewisham following a by-election in the Downham Ward. Later that year, he was elected onto the Safer Communities Board at the Local Government Group as Lead Member for the Liberal Democrats. He was re-elected for the Downham Ward in May 2010, and appointed "Community Cohesion and PREVENT Champion" at the Local Government Group months later.

In autumn 2010, Brooks was named among the potential candidates for the 2012 London mayoral election but was never shortlisted. He was part of the team around the eventual Liberal Democrat Mayoral candidate, Brian Paddick, said to be as a proposed Deputy for Youth and Communities. He stood unsuccessfully as the Liberal Democrat candidate for Mayor of Lewisham in 2014. He was appointed Officer of the Order of the British Empire in the 2015 Birthday Honours for public and political service.

Brooks was shortlisted to be the party's candidate for the 2016 London mayoral election, but withdrew in August 2015 in order to assist a review of stop and search by police in Northamptonshire. In 2018, he stood unsuccessfully as an independent candidate to become Mayor of Lewisham.

Brooks joined the Conservative Party in May 2018. He was longlisted to be their 2020 London mayoral candidate, but was not selected.
