= 1993 Welling riots =

English riots

On 16 October 1993, an anti-racism march near Welling in South East London turned violent, leading to large-scale clashes between police and protesters which left around 70 people injured. The march was intending to demand the closure of a bookshop which was the headquarters of the British National Party (BNP).

== Background ==
The BNP opened an office in a bookshop at 154 Upper Wickham Lane in Welling, South East London, in 1989, which served as the party's headquarters. The local area saw a sharp increase in the number of racist attacks in the years following the opening of the office, including the murder of Stephen Lawrence in neighbouring Eltham in April 1993, which had caused opposition to the bookshop to intensify. In the same year, the BNP had its first local councillor elected, in the London Borough of Tower Hamlets.

== The march ==
On 16 October 1993, demonstrators gathered on Winn's Common in Plumstead, South East London, for a demonstration co-ordinated by the Anti-Nazi League and Youth against Racism in Europe. Estimates for the number of demonstrators range from 15,000 to 45,000. They planned to march to the BNP bookshop in Welling to demand its closure, but the initial route passing directly past the property was blocked by Metropolitan Police Commissioner Paul Condon. The protesters left and headed towards Welling, via the main road that passed through East Wickham. The march started peacefully, but as the protesters approached the bookshop, the road was completely blocked by riot police. The police had set up a wide exclusion zone around the bookshop that began in at the bottom of the hill in East Wickham, just before the main road entered Welling. At this point a large police contingent of riot and mounted police tried to divert the march at an intersection with an adjourning road, away from the bookshop. Soon the protest escalated into violence, which led to large-scale clashes between the police and some of the protesters. During clashes lasting 90 minutes, police used truncheons and horseback charges, which was criticised as indiscriminate by organisers of the march. The march was eventually abandoned.

== Aftermath ==
74 people were injured in the riots, including 12 police officers. The clashes were the most serious civil disorder in London since the poll tax riots in 1990. The Metropolitan Police spent £1 million and 7,000 officers to police the event. Many of the protesters were arrested and charged, including Duwayne Brooks, a friend of Stephen Lawrence who had been with him at the time of his murder. The case against Brooks was eventually dismissed by a judge. The bookshop in Welling was eventually closed down by Bexley Council in 1995.
