= Eltham railway station =

National Rail station in London, England

Eltham
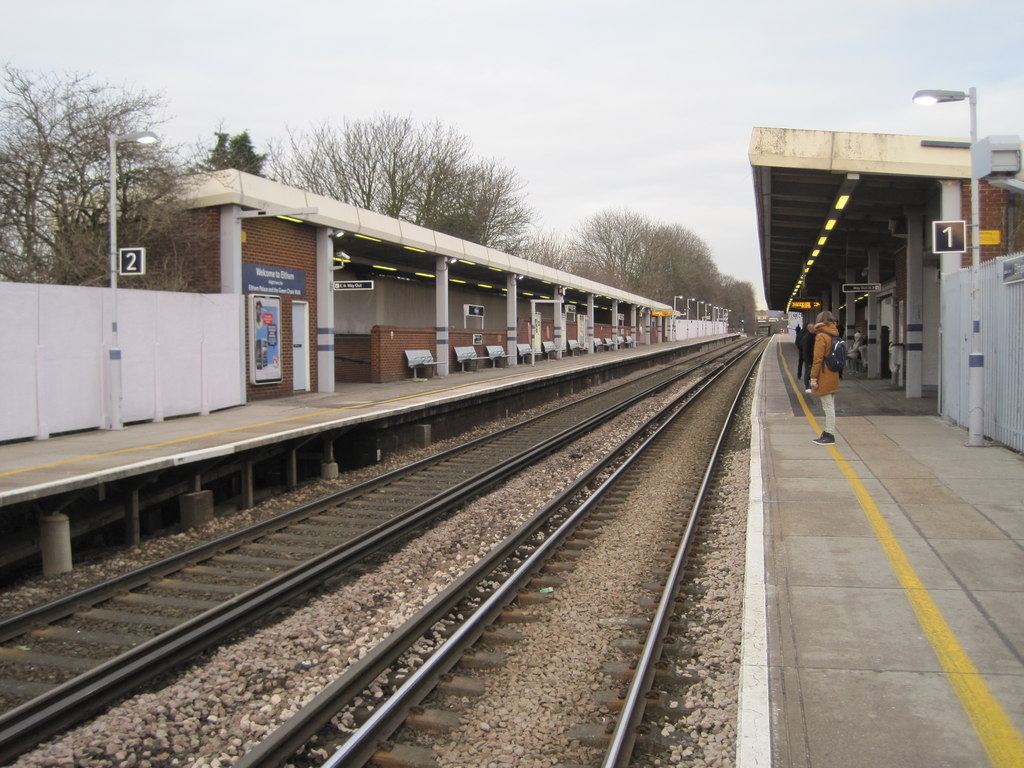
- Interactive map of Eltham

General information
- Location: Eltham
- Local authority: Royal Borough of Greenwich
- Managed by: Southeastern
- Station code: ELW
- DfT category: C2
- Number of platforms: 2
- Accessible: Yes
- Fare zone: 4

National Rail annual entry and exit
- 2020–21: ▼0.578 million
- 2021–22: ▲1.297 million
- 2022–23: ▲1.463 million
- 2023–24: ▲1.622 million
- 2024–25: ▲1.758 million

Key dates
- 17 March 1985: Opened

Other information
- External links: Departures; Facilities
- Coordinates: 51.4555°N 0.0515°E

Eltham railway station is in the Well Hall area of Eltham, South East London, within the Royal Borough of Greenwich. It is 10 miles 68 chains (17.5 km) measured from London Victoria. It is in London fare zone 4.

The station is operated by Southeastern. The station has two platforms: platform 1 for services to Central London and platform 2 for Dartford and Barnehurst.

== History ==
Before 1985, there were two railway stations in Eltham on the Bexleyheath line.

Eltham Well Hall (originally just 'Well Hall'), which opened on 1 May 1895, was about 220 yards (200 m) to the west of the present-day station on the other side of Well Hall Road. It was one of five stations with wooden buildings and was constructed on the west side of the main road, In 1932 the Well Hall buildings were rebuilt.

Eltham Park station, which opened 1 May 1908, was about 500 yards (460 m) further east of the current station with its main entrance adjacent to the London-bound platform, and footpaths to Westmount Road and Glenesk Road. An additional footpath linking the country-bound platform with Westmount Road was available at peak times.

Both stations were closed and replaced by the current station which was opened by British Rail on 17 March 1985 when a new section of the A2, the Rochester Way Relief Road, had opened. A bus station that was built on a raft above the A2 was opened at the same time. The new station retains a nod to Eltham Well Hall station in its CRS code, which is ELW.

The platforms and buildings of the abandoned Eltham Park station still exist, but there is no trace of Eltham Well Hall station, the site of which is west of the A208 Well Hall Road where the A2 motorway passes under the concrete railway bridge after coming out of a short tunnel beneath Eltham station.

== Accidents ==
On 11 June 1972, a train derailed near Eltham Well Hall station, when the driver went round a sharp curve too fast. The driver and five passengers were killed, plus 126 people injured; an investigation revealed the driver was drunk.

== Location ==
The station is located on Well Hall Road, 0.5 miles (0.80 km) from Eltham High Street.

== Buses ==
Eltham station is served by several Transport for London bus routes, the 132, 161, 162, 233, 286 and 314 in the adjoining Eltham bus station. These buses carry passengers from the station to Bexley, Bromley, Blackfen, Chislehurst, Greenwich, Mottingham, New Addington, New Eltham, Sidcup, Swanley and Woolwich.

== Services ==
All services at Eltham are operated by Southeastern using Class 376, 465, 466 and 707 EMUs.

The typical off-peak service in trains per hour is:

- 2 tph to London Victoria
- 1 tph to London Charing Cross
- 2 tph to London Cannon Street
- 2 tph to Slade Green, continuing to London Cannon Street via Woolwich Arsenal and Greenwich
- 3 tph to Dartford

During the peak hours, the service between London Charing Cross and Dartford is increased to 2 tph in each direction.

| Preceding station | National Rail | Following station |
|---|---|---|
| Kidbrooke | Southeastern Bexleyheath Line | Falconwood |
