= Welling =

Town in South East London, England

Coordinates: 51.4594°N 0.1097°E

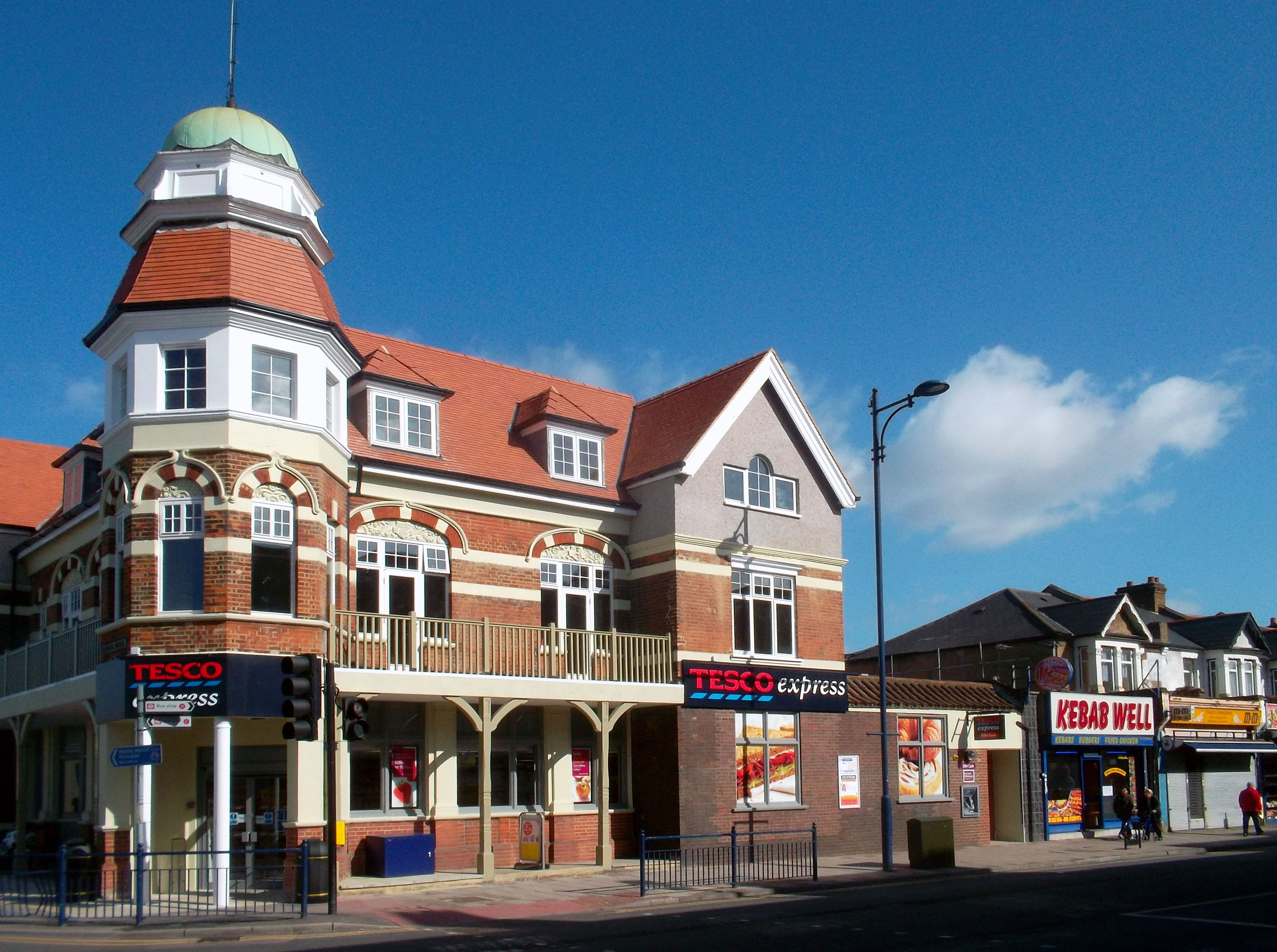
- Shops on Bellegrove Road

- Location within Greater London
- Population: 41,000
- OS grid reference: TQ465755
  - Charing Cross: 10.5 mi (16.9 km) WNW
- London borough: Bexley
- Ceremonial county: Greater London
- Region: London
- Country: England
- Sovereign state: United Kingdom
- Post town: WELLING
- Postcode district: DA16
- Dialling code: 020
- Police: Metropolitan
- Fire: London
- Ambulance: London
- UK Parliament: Old Bexley & Sidcup and Bexleyheath and Crayford
- London Assembly: Bexley and Bromley

Welling is a town in South East London, England, in the London Borough of Bexley, 1.5 miles (2.4 km) west of Bexleyheath, 4 miles (6.4 km) southeast of Woolwich and 10.5 miles (16.9 km) of Charing Cross. It was part of Kent prior to the creation of Greater London in 1965.

== Etymology ==
Local legend has it that Welling is so called because in the era of horse-drawn vehicles it could be said you were "well in" to Kent, or had a "well end" to the journey up and down Shooters Hill which, at the time was steep, had a poor road surface and was a notorious haunt of highwaymen. Until the 1800s, most of Welling down to Blackfen was covered in woodland which offered excellent concealment for outlaws and robbers who would prey on vulnerable slow-moving horse-drawn traffic.

Local historians have recently concluded that the origin of the name is most likely from Welwyn (meaning 'place of the spring'), due to the existence of an underground spring located at Welling Corner, or possibly a manorial reference to the Willing family, who lived in the area in 1301. The town was referred to as 'Wellen' in John Ogilby's 1675 road atlas.

== History ==
=== Early history ===
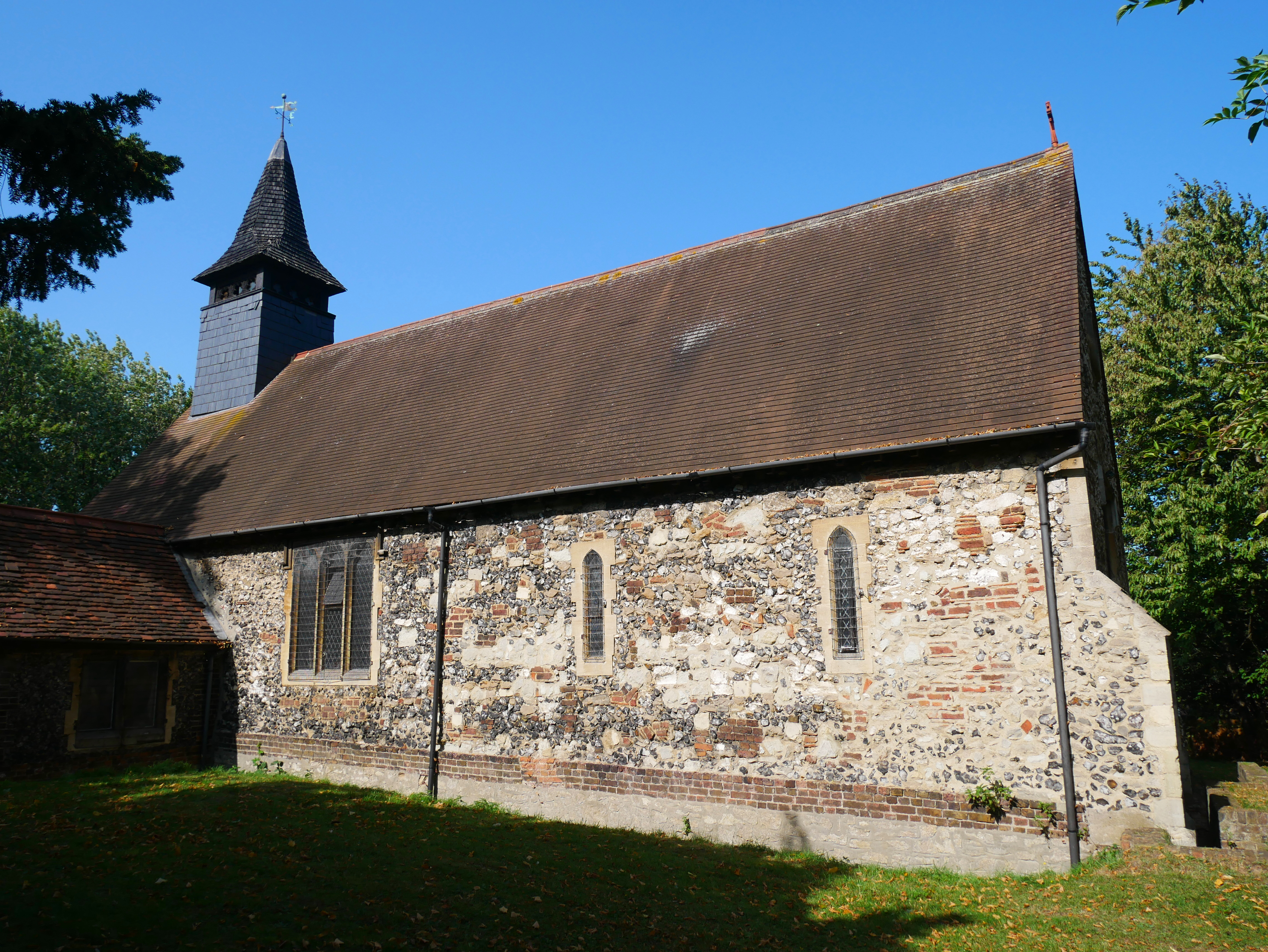
The medieval church in Welling, now used by a Greek Orthodox congregation

The East Wickham part of Welling is probably one of the oldest settlements in this area. A Neolithic stone axe was found in East Wickham in 1910, and remains of Roman buildings were unearthed near Danson in 1989.

Before opening of the Bexleyheath Line on 1 May 1895, Welling was a village on the main road from London into Kent (Watling Street). It had been a traditional staging post for coaches; the presence of three inns along the main road is the result of that.

=== 20th century ===
After World War I, Bexley Urban District Council built over 400 houses north of the railway. Later, when the Danson estate was sold to developers, the land to the south was opened up to suburban sprawl and the settlement incorporated the local parishes of St Michael's East Wickham and St Johns Welling

The area was part of the Municipal Borough of Bexley in the administrative county of Kent until, in 1965, the borough was abolished under the London Government Act 1963 and its area transferred to Greater London to form part of the present-day London Borough of Bexley.

For five years after 1990, the headquarters of the far-right British National Party (formed in 1982) were based in Welling. The area became the scene of anti-racist riots in 1993. Bexley Council shut down the BNP Headquarters in 1995.

In 1992 a group of local people, led by local Councillor Nigel Betts, revived the old Memorial Hall Trust which was set up in 1921. In 1995 it started operation as a local grant giving charity called the East Wickham & Welling War Memorial Trust[1] using the revenue from the old hall to fund grants in the area. Its main aim is remember the men of the district who were killed in World War One so a new War Memorial was built in 1996. Its charitable aim is to help local groups with rents on their meeting places or to help groups maintain their halls. Other grants help young people with adventurous activities and there is an annual academic bursary. In 2006 it gave grants totaling £47,000. As part of a re-investment programme, the Trust sold the Hall for a housing redevelopment in 2007.

=== 21st century ===
A major upgrade of paving and street lighting was completed in the autumn of 2005. The retention or removal of a section of westbound bus lane from Welling High Street became one of the few specific local issues on which the main political parties disagreed in the approach to the local Bexley Council elections held on 4 May 2006. The incoming Conservative administration immediately revoked the bus lane.

The MECCA bingo hall in Upper Wickham Lane has ceased trading, apparently one of nine in England unsuited to operate after the national ban on smoking in public places. This large building, which originally was an Odeon cinema is operating now as Freedom Centre International, a Pentecostal Church.

== Education ==
Secondary schools in Welling include:

- Bexley Grammar School
- Harris Academy Falconwood
- Welling School

Primary schools in Welling include:

- Bishop Ridley CofE Primary School (formerly Westwood Primary School)
- Danson Primary School
- East Wickham Primary Academy
- Eastcote Primary School
- Fosters Primary School
- Hillsgrove Primary School
- Hook Lane Primary School
- St Michael's East Wickham CoE Primary School
- St Stephen's Catholic Primary School
- Aspire Academy Bexley (formerly Westbrooke School)

== Culture ==
The "Old Koffi Pot" café, dating from the 1930s was until the early 1990s known as 'Ferrara's'. The venue was well known locally for its ice cream and enjoyed its heyday at the height of the 1960s cafe culture, when young people from Kent and South East London would call in for refreshments on the way to or from dancing at the Embassy Ballroom (since demolished to make way for the building of Embassy Court). The "Old Koffi Pot" closed in 2009 for 'economic reasons', but a modern coffee shop has since opened in its place retaining the name "The Koffi Shop" but a brand new black frontage and interior decor have removed any historical link with the original establishment.

== Landmarks ==
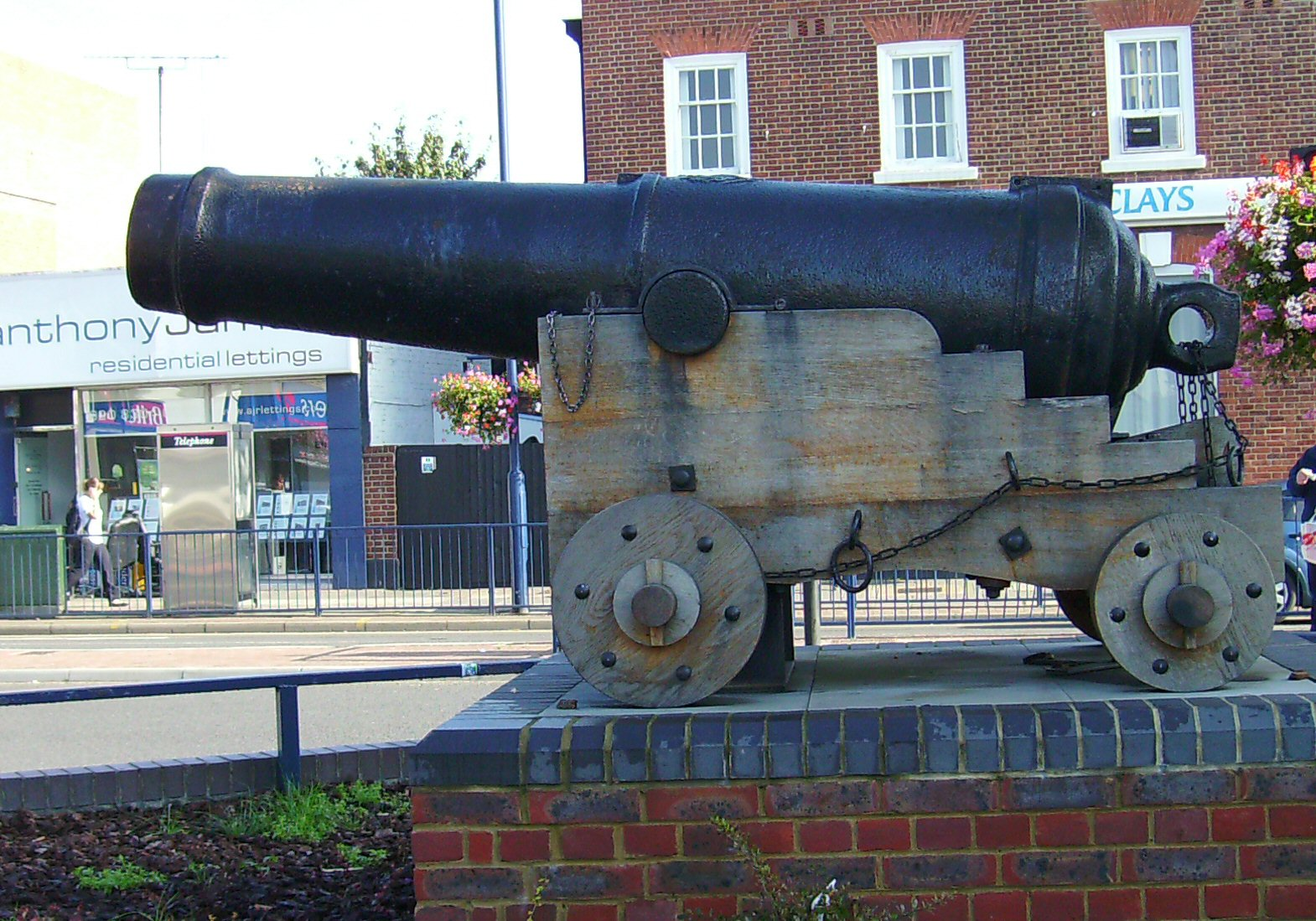
Russian Cannon from Crimean War, located at Welling Corner

A large Russian cannon is located at Welling corner. This Russian weapon is a 36-pounder carronade (calibre 6.75 inches – weight 17 cwt) of a type used during the Crimean War (1854 to 1860), displayed on a simple wooden replica carriage. The carronade was in service from 1780 to 1860 and is now on loan from the Royal Artillery Museum in Woolwich as a reminder of Welling's early association with the Royal Arsenal, Woolwich, when huts at East Wickham were built as homes for munitions workers in the Great War.

The former Foster's School building in Upper Wickham Lane is a local landmark. The school relocated to Westbrooke Road in Welling and its original site was converted to residential use (retaining the old Grade II listed main school building and headmaster's house).

Further north of the original site is the 12th-century former St Michael's, East Wickham church, now used by a Greek Orthodox congregation. A new St Michael's church was built next door in 1933, and the original church became a chapel of ease. It was declared redundant in 1973 and acquired by the Orthodox the following year. Another church in the area is St Mary's Church, Welling, a daughter church of St Michael's, which was built in 1955 and which contains a number of examples of 20th-century liturgical art.

== Transport ==
=== Rail ===
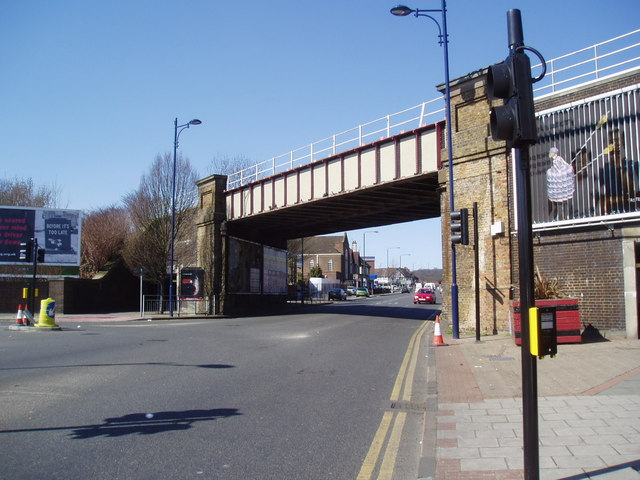
Railway overbridge in Welling

Welling station connects the area with National Rail services on the Bexleyheath line to London Victoria, London Charing Cross, London Cannon Street, Slade Green, Dartford and Gravesend.

=== Buses ===
Welling is served by London Buses routes 51, 89, 96, 486, B15, B16 and N89. These connect it with places including Barnehurst, Bexleyheath, Blackfen, Blackheath, Bluewater, Charlton, Crayford, Dartford, Eltham, Falconwood, Kidbrooke, Lewisham, North Greenwich, Orpington, Plumstead, Shooters Hill, Sidcup, Slade Green, St Mary Cray and Woolwich.

== Politics and government ==
Welling is part of the Old Bexley and Sidcup constituency for elections to the House of Commons of the United Kingdom, currently represented by Louie French from the Conservative Party.

Welling is part of the Falconwood and Welling ward for elections to London Borough of Bexley.

== Notable people ==
- Kate Bush (1958–), singer/songwriter, grew up in East Wickham Farm on Wickham Street
- Anjem Choudary (1967–), Islamist political activist, born and grew up in Welling
- Ernest Greenwood (1913–2009), artist, teacher and former president of the Royal Watercolour Society, born in Welling
- Steve Hillier (1969–), musician, DJ, record producer
- Bill Peyto (1869–1943), pioneering Canadian mountain guide and park ranger, born in Welling
- Tom Raworth (1938–2017), poet and visual artist, born in Bexleyheath and grew up in Welling
- John Waller (1940–2018), English historical European martial arts (HEMA) revival pioneer and fight director, born in Welling
