= Eltham Well Hall rail crash =

1972 rail crash in London, England

Coordinates: 51°27′19″N 0°03′01″E

Details
- Date: 11 June 1972; 21:35
- Location: Eltham Well Hall
- Country: England
- Line: Bexleyheath Line (BR Southern Region)
- Operator: British Rail
- Incident type: Derailment caused by excessive speed
- Cause: Driver was intoxicated.

Statistics
- Trains: 1
- Passengers: 10 'well filled' coaches
- Crew: 3
- Deaths: 6 (5 Passengers, 1 crew)
- Injured: 126 (125 Passengers, 1 crew)

The Eltham Well Hall rail crash was an accident on the British railway system that occurred on 11 June 1972 at approximately 21:35. An excursion train from Margate to Kentish Town derailed on a sharp curve at Eltham Well Hall station, Eltham, London. The curve had a maximum permitted speed to be taken at 20 miles per hour (32 km/h) but the train was estimated to have been travelling at 65 miles per hour (105 km/h) resulting in the locomotive and all but one of the ten carriages derailing.

The driver Robert Wilsdon and five passengers were killed, and 126 people were injured. At the subsequent public inquiry it was revealed that Wilsdon was drunk.

== Robert Wilsdon ==
The driver of the Excursion train was Robert Wilsdon, a Driver for British Rail's Southern Region based at Hither Green TMD since December 1961.

He had been working on the railways since 1958 and was experienced to drive the British Rail Class 47 locomotive, which would occasionally come down from trains in other regions.

Despite his experience and long time working on the railways, Wilsdon had been reprimanded five times throughout his career.

Of these penalties, three were fairly minor isolated offences (unauthorised absence in October 1960, persistent lateness in February 1961 and a "relatively minor driving offence" in February 1963) but two were serious offences, one of which resulted in a temporary suspension.

The first occurred on 7 November 1961, when Wilsdon had been fined £150 for being drunk and disorderly, causing damage to a shop window and assaulting a police constable whilst off-duty. Although Wilsdon paid the fine, British Rail was not notified of this occurrence until a colleague of Wilsdon's was similarly charged five days later. Both men were subsequently suspended shortly afterwards, against which Wilsdon immediately appealed, claiming that the event was an isolated incident.

He stated that he was thoroughly ashamed and that he had been celebrating a promotion to the position of Passed Fireman with his colleague who greatly assisted him. He later claimed to a representative from the Associated Society of Locomotive Engineers and Firemen (ASLEF) that he would not drink again. ASLEF and its General Secretary William Evans sided with Wilsdon.

Both Wilsdon and his colleague were reinstated on 18 December 1961, with Wilsdon being promoted to driver less than a week later on 25 December with his transfer to Hither Green. His colleague was similarly promoted but resigned in early 1963 after a series of reprimands and suspensions.

The public inquiry into the accident eleven years later agreed that this incident was a seemingly isolated occurrence and all had reason to believe Wilsdon; the line manager who reinstated the two was not criticised for this approach, although some criticism was given to the management in 1961 for promoting Wilsdon so quickly after being reinstated.

The second incident occurred on 28 March 1969, when Wilsdon was fined £1 for being drunk in Lewisham. Again, he was off-duty at the time and British Rail was not informed of this occurrence until April. He was not suspended for this incident since his superior at Hither Green was busy then went on leave, and as such was not able to speak with Wilsdon until June.

He subsequently gave Wilsdon a stern reprimand and advised him that such behaviour was not acceptable. The actions of his superior regarding this incident were criticised as "unwise" but were not considered a serious failing. It was concluded that his eventual response to Wilsdon's behaviour was appropriate.

Since 1969, Wilsdon had had a clean record with no reprimands. By 1972 he was married with young children and living in Rainham, Kent - which meant he would usually have to make an almost two hour rail commute to his depot at Hither Green. This travel time and distance between Rainham and Hither Green played a key role in the accident that occurred.

== Events ==
=== Margate excursions ===
On Sunday 11 June 1972, a day-trip to Margate had been arranged for the employees (and their families) of British Rail's Midland Region based at the North London depot at Kentish Town. Owing to the large number of day-trippers booked for this customary annual works-outing, a pair of excursion trains were laid on to transport them to Margate and back.

These trains would be driven by Southern Region drivers for some of the journey (particularly to ensure that experienced drivers took the trains through the complex arrangements around Clapham Junction) and would, on reaching Margate and being cleared of passengers, take them onward to Ramsgate Depot where they would be stored until the return trip.

The outbound journeys left Kentish Town around 0830, were completed uneventfully and the trains stabled at Ramsgate as planned.

The second excursion train, scheduled to leave Margate at 20:05 was to be crewed by Driver Wilsdon, Secondman P.E. Stokes and Guard H. Atterbury.

Stokes was 18 years old and had been working on the railways for almost two years at the time of the accident, having been based at Hither Green this entire time. He had worked with Wilsdon occasionally before and had driven with him a few times prior.

Guard Atterbury was 57, had been a guard since 1948 and was based at London Bridge; although he had worked the Bexleyheath line before, he had never done so on a fast train. He had worked with Wilsdon a few times before and considered him an experienced driver.

Wilsdon and Stokes were to sign on duty at Hither Green in person by 15:42 to catch a train as passengers to Ramsgate, transferring at Dartford.

The 20:05 return excursion train crewed by Wilsdon, Stokes and Atterbury consisted of a British Rail Class 47 locomotive, No.1630 from the Midland Region, and ten coaches; a Brake Second Corridor, a Second Corridor, a Composite Corridor, three more Second Corridors, another Composite, a Tourist Standard Open, another Second Corridor and another Brake Second Corridor at the rear. All of the coaches were Mark 1 rolling stock with the oldest coach dating back to 1954 and the newest coach dating to 1962.

=== Events prior to Wilsdon arriving at Ramsgate ===
As he did not need to be on duty until the afternoon, Wilsdon joined his two brothers for lunch at around 12:55, the three travelling to a local pub where they stayed until closing time just after 14:00. Here, Wilsdon drank two pints of light and bitter and a half pint of light ale which was confirmed by his brothers who'd drunk similarly.

According to them, the three returned home and spent the afternoon indoors with the children until Robert was driven by one of his brothers to Rainham station at around 17:15. Both brothers confirmed that he had not drunk after leaving the pub and were adamant on this point at the later public inquiry.

However, this evidence was contradicted by a later statement made by Secondman Stokes that when they met at Ramsgate, Wilsdon told Stokes that he had "ended up going somewhere and drinking some sherry".

At 15:22 Wilsdon signed on duty with Hither Green by telephone. He claimed that he was going to head directly to Ramsgate from Rainham and said that he had to catch an earlier train from Rainham (the 15:32 instead of the 15:42, which was not running on Sundays) and therefore asked Hither Green if he could be considered on-duty from 15:12. This was agreed as there was no evidence to the contrary and it was believed that Wilsdon was travelling to Ramsgate at this time.

In reality, Wilsdon did not leave for Rainham station until 17:15 and as such his move was solely to gain pay for an extra two hours for which he had not actually been on duty. It also meant that his Supervisors at Hither Green would not see him in person.

By contrast to this, secondman Stokes arrived at Hither Green, signed on duty in person at around 15:12 and was instructed by the Supervisor to travel on the 15:32 train and try to meet Wilsdon on the train.

This did not occur, and the two met up at Ramsgate Depot by the locomotive at around 18:25. Stokes had arrived first, having spoken with the supervisor at Ramsgate to ascertain the details of the train.

Wilsdon did not meet with the supervisor at Ramsgate, probably because his was the only Class 47 engine at the depot and would have been easy to find.

=== Leaving for Margate ===
When Stokes boarded the engine, he waited alone in the cab until around 18:25 when Wilsdon arrived and spoke about the preparations for the journey back to London.

Stokes recalled that when Wilsdon turned to speak with him, he "smelt something pretty strong" on the driver's breath and when asked, Wilsdon explained that he had been drinking at lunchtime and later had some sherry prior to arriving in Ramsgate. This evidence contradicts that of Wilsdon's brothers who claimed that he had not drunk between 14:02 and 17:15.

Despite this, Wilsdon suggested the pair go to the nearby Railway Staff Association Club at about 19:00 and get a drink to which Stokes agreed, with the pair arriving just in time for the club to open at 19:05. The pair had three pints of light and bitter each with Wilsdon possibly drinking another half pint of light ale, according to the evidence of club staff who served him. Stokes was uncertain on this point but agreed that "Bob could have got one in". Running slightly late and at Wilsdon's urging, the pair returned to Ramsgate Depot at around 19:40.

Guard Atterbury, who arrived at Ramsgate some hours earlier and had been relaxing in the staff break room of the station, had gone to prepare the train for its departure at around 19:30 and initially noted that the engine crew were absent. Before he could go ask superiors as to where they were, he saw Stokes and Wilsdon return. He briefed the pair on the train's particulars with Wilsdon appearing sober and routine.

The empty train left Ramsgate and made an uneventful journey to Margate, arriving at around 19:59.

=== Margate ===
The train arrived at Margate and the boarding of passengers was routine, with boarding complete by 20:04. Stationmaster Arundell signalled the train clear to depart for London, but both he and Atterbury found that there was no response in the cab.

When Arundell went to examine the cab, he found it empty but after returning shortly afterwards, saw a pair of beer bottles in the cab. Arundell believed that they were a gift left by the organisers of the excursion to the engine crew - such being a normal 'tip' for excursion drivers to enjoy off-duty - and he did not question their appearance.

Shortly thereafter, Wilsdon and Stokes returned and entered the cab preparing for departure, with neither seeming unusual: when Arundell told them to hurry up, Wilsdon calmly noted they could regain lost time on the journey. A member of staff on the platform at this time noted that he had seen both Stokes and Wilsdon depart the locomotive and leave the station via Platform No.1 three minutes after having arrived at Margate and this was later compared with the timings made by Guard Atterbury, who recorded a 20:13 departure from Margate (eight minutes late) noting that both Stokes and Wilsdon were absent.

Exactly where the pair went in this period is unknown owing to Wilsdon's death and Stokes having little recollection of the events after leaving Ramsgate and although another pub was close to the station, it was considered that neither had time to reach it.

=== The journey ===
Having left Margate eight minutes late and scheduled to run non-stop (aside from a later stop to change crew), Wilsdon was able to run the train at high speed and according to Atterbury's timings, was only a minute late after passing Faversham (24 miles (39 km) from Margate).

However, as the train approached Sittingbourne, the train was forced to briefly stop due to signals and it was held again momentarily around Rainham by Signalman Obee who had been forced to open his level crossing to allow a pair of buses through as the train was running late. After the crossing was cleared, he set the route for the train to proceed but instead, the train came to a stop at the platform.

Railman Fleming, who was on duty at the platform and knew Wilsdon well, saw the train arrive and asked Wilsdon if it had broken down (owing to the clear signal visible from the platform), to which Wilsdon merely said "No" and jumped down from his cab before walking to a telephone on the platform to speak with Obee. He used the correct telephone and spoke quite clearly and was not at all slurred according to both Fleming and Obee.

According to Obee, Wilsdon had stopped at Rainham to inquire of the position of the first excursion train, which Obee explained was to stop at Gillingham railway station and would let Wilsdon overtake it, which was not as planned (Wilsdon's train was to overtake the first excursion train at Newington railway station which was prior to Rainham); to which Wilsdon told him "you should read your weekly notices".

Although uncertain, it seems that Wilsdon believed that the two stoppages that occurred to his train at Sittingbourne and Rainham and having not seen the first excursion train at Newington, was because the first train was running slowly and kept stopping his train. He later commented to Stokes a joking complaint about the driver of the first excursion train, calling him a "slow bastard".

Upon completing his phone conversation, Wilsdon returned to his cab and departed having been stopped at Rainham for about four minutes.

A combination of the signal checks at Sittingbourne and Rainham and the unscheduled stop at Rainham had caused Wilsdon to lose most of the progress he had made between Margate and Sittingbourne.

Shortly after leaving Rainham, Atterbury noted that the speed seemed "a little bit excessive" and that Wilsdon had been braking intensely between Gillingham and Chatham railway station.

The last station the train passed on its journey that Atterbury had to time was at Bexleyheath railway station 4.3 miles (6.9 km) east of the accident site. According to his notes, the train passed through Bexleyheath at 21:31, seven minutes behind schedule (estimates showed that Wilsdon had made up at least a minute and a half between Gillingham and Strood) and was running on clear signals.

=== The crash ===
Although Atterbury had been somewhat concerned about excessive speed between Gillingham and Chatham, he stated that Wilsdon had operated appropriately through Dartford.

However, when approaching Eltham Park railway station he became concerned at the train's apparent speed and more so as it neared Eltham Well Hall, where a sharp curve changed the train's direction from southwest to northwest. Trying to gain Wilsdon's attention, he made two light applications ("splashes") of the guard's brake. It seems these splashes were too late and light to register in the cab. By the time the train approached Eltham Well Hall station it was running at around 65 miles per hour (105 km/h).

Railman Akehurst, who was on duty on the Well Hall platforms, had seen several earlier trains pass through the station and thence the curve, all of them slowing to the safe speed of 20 miles per hour (32 km/h) but when he saw the excursion train approaching, he was quite certain it was traveling far beyond that speed. He immediately tried to signal to the driver to stop but was unable to gain Wilsdon's attention. The train passed through at high speed without braking and sped into the curve at around 65 miles per hour (105 km/h).

At no point did Wilsdon attempt to slow his train beyond having already shut off the engine to coast which was normal at this long downhill sector of the line. In the cab, Stokes later recalled that Wilsdon had suddenly shouted in a frightened way at the sight of the curve approaching, to which Stokes immediately braced himself in the seconds that he had available.

The locomotive jumped the sharp curve, derailing and rolling onto its left side and sliding through a coal yard.

The front of the cab was torn open and debris thrown and "ploughed" inside, killing Wilsdon and severely injuring Stokes. The first coach followed the overturned locomotive but remained upright, the coupling failing quite late into the sequence.

It came to a stand lying parallel with the locomotive, having jack-knifed and pushed slightly around so the leading cab was facing back towards the line and the rear cab was pointing away from the track. The rear end of the first coach came to rest up against the leading cab.

The second and third coach followed the first coach until relatively late into the derailment, with the coupling between the first and second failing around the end of the derailment. This caused both coaches to overturn onto their right side, with the leading end of the second coach coming to a stand in front of the locomotive and the rear of the first coach, which in combination with the fourth coach, formed an "N" shape with the first four coaches. Both were severely damaged.

The fourth coach had ended up roughly 90 degrees to the track, leaning over on its left side. The rear of the coach had been somewhat damaged by the fifth, sixth and seventh coaches passing by it, derailed but still on the track. All three of these coaches were leaning over on their left sides to various degrees, with the leading end of the fifth coach having been badly damaged by the impact with the fourth coach.

The eighth coach was upright but derailed, the ninth coach was derailed at its leading bogie but also upright, and the tenth coach (in which Atterbury had been riding) was upright and on the rails, though some internal damage had occurred.

The derailed train came to a halt very close to an electrical substation powering the third rail for electric multiple unit trains and this had immediately short-circuited.

Railman Akehurst, who had heard the derailment, immediately called Dartford signal box and reported the derailment.

Emergency services were notified, and arrived between 21:40 and 21:42. As well as Wilsdon, two passengers died at the scene; a woman later died of her injuries in August and a male likewise in November, bringing the number of fatalities to five. 125 passengers were injured. Among the survivors was the actor Phil Daniels.

== Aftermath ==
A public inquiry carried out into the cause of the accident was launched on 12 June 1972 by Colonel John R.H. Robertson that looked into the cause of the derailment.

The Report for the crash was released on 1 June 1973 and it quite clearly showed that the accident was caused entirely by the actions of Robert Wilsdon, in that he had "grossly impaired his ability to drive safely by drinking a considerable quantity of alcohol both before and after booking on duty". He was thoroughly critical of Wilsdon's behaviour, describing it as "reprehensible" and "disgraceful".

His suspension in 1961 was considered a warning sign of Wilsdon's alcoholic tendencies but it was agreed that at the time there was no evidence to disprove Wilsdon's statements that he would better himself and not drink again. The 1969 incident also showed Wilsdon's disregard of what had occurred in 1961 but it was agreed that the manager at the time had been unwise in waiting two months to question Wilsdon, but had acted appropriately when he did.

British Rail staff who came in contact with Wilsdon on 11 June (his supervisor at Hither Green, depot staff at Ramsgate, Secondman Stokes, Railway Club staff at Ramsgate, Guard Atterbury, Stationmaster Arundell and his staff at Margate, Railman Fleming and Signalman Obee at Rainham) were all intensively questioned and gave evidence at the inquiry regarding the state of Wilsdon, to which all agreed that Wilsdon appeared perfectly fit and sober even as late as his unscheduled stop in Rainham, with the only person aware of Wilsdon already having drunk alcohol prior to reaching Ramsgate being Secondman Stokes, who considered him still fit and sober enough to drive the train.

None of the staff were criticised for failing to stop Wilsdon from his duties under the belief he was too drunk and evidence by Wilsdon's father-in-law, brothers and friends confirmed that although Wilsdon did drink heavily, he could "carry" his alcohol well and that the amount of alcohol he drank was not enough to make his drunkenness visible, although the report believed that Wilsdon's actions at Rainham and his reactions at Eltham Well Hall clearly showed that he was beginning to suffer effects of drunkenness.

Secondman Stokes, who agreed with Wilsdon to get some extra drinks at Ramsgate was severely criticised for his "disgraceful" behaviour in drinking three pints prior to taking the train back to Margate, but it was agreed that Stokes' young age and weak character meant that he seemed unwilling to stop Wilsdon from going to get some drink. Guard Atterbury was not criticised whatsoever for his behaviour and it was considered unfortunate that his "splashes" were too weak to gain Wilsdon's attention.

From the evidence gained of Wilsdon's activities on 11 June, a fairly thorough timeline of Wilsdon's movements were tracked and confirmed by those who he made contact with but three moments of uncertainty were later found in Wilsdon's movements that day.

The first and most serious of these moments was that it was uncertain what had occurred with Wilsdon and his brothers between 14:02 and 17:15 with his brothers both declaring that Wilsdon had not drunk after returning from the pub in Rainham. In contrast, Stokes claimed that Wilsdon mentioned drinking some sherry when they met at Ramsgate.

Although Robertson could not confirm Stokes' statements, he considered it likely that Wilsdon had drunk after 14:02 owing to the smell on Wilsdon's breath at Rainham several hours later and, whilst not explicitly accusing Wilsdon's brothers of lying, considered that anybody who tried to hide evidence of Wilsdon's drinking that day "did him a disservice".

The second uncertain moment was what occurred to both him and Stokes during the stop at Margate, in which both seemingly left the station via the Platform No.1 entrance. Stokes was unable to recall much of what occurred between arriving at Margate and when Wilsdon died, so it was uncertain as to what had occurred during this period, and although a pub was close to the station, it was considered that they did not have enough time to reach it.

The final uncertainty was that when his body was autopsied, Wilsdon's blood alcohol content was 0.278% (the legal limit for driving a road vehicle in England at that time was 0.08%). There was an imbalance with the urine alcohol level which made it very likely that the driver had also been drinking alcohol within an hour of his death, meaning it was possible he had been drinking at the controls.

Investigating this theory, the morning after the accident, the cab was searched and three smashed glasses were found in the cab's wreckage. Two of them were the beer bottles that Stationmaster Arundell had seen at Margate and both were confirmed to have been unopened. A third smashed bottle found was later proven to have been a medicine bottle and was unlikely to have carried any alcohol at the time of the accident.

The only other theory was that Wilsdon had obtained a bottle of spirits at some point, stored it on his person and had drunk it at some point after leaving Margate, and later disposed of the glass by throwing it out the window of the locomotive, with the theory being that Wilsdon either obtained the bottle at some point whilst in Margate or had kept one on his person since he left Rainham for work.

Despite this, Robertson felt that there was no severe issue with drinking amongst drivers on Britain's railways, with only two other accidents (one in 1913 and another in 1952) having occurred explicitly due to driver drunkenness in the sixty years prior to the accident, and as such he believed that it was a combination of railway staff's thoughts and self-discipline for drivers' behaviour with alcohol.

The last recommendation that Robertson made regarding the accident was the usage of telephone to sign on duty within the Southern Region. Whilst it was agreed that it was a fairly common occurrence in the Southern Region and British Rail had adopted a policy where certain drivers could be granted need to book on via telephone (typically those either living far from depots or those whose duties commenced far from their depots).

This procedure was considered practical and was allowed to remain in use, but it was agreed that the method Wilsdon used (where he casually booked on duty and for his own benefit of gaining two additional hours' pay by booking on at 15:22 instead of around 17:00 when he actually did leave home for work) was not appropriate and was to be stopped or prevented wherever possible.

This issue was however was brought up again in 1991 after the Cannon Street station rail crash in which the driver in that instance was believed to have been high on cannabis and caused a buffer-stop collision.

Although it was agreed that the signalling played no part in the collision, it was later agreed that the signals around Eltham Well Hall would be redesigned to slow a train to round the curve rather than remain at green, which would mean it would be less likely a driver would be caught by surprise with the curve.

== See also ==
- Morpeth rail crashes (UK) – several derailments on a sharp curve, one in 1984 possibly involving alcohol
- Malbone Street Wreck (US) – at least 93 fatalities in a 1918 derailment caused by excessive speed on a curve
- Rosedale train crash (Australia) – injuries only following a 2004 derailment caused by excessive speed on a curve
- 1906 Salisbury rail crash (UK) – an express train derailed and collided with a milk train caused by excessive speed on a curve
