= Cannon Street rail crash =

1991 train crash in London

Coordinates: 51°30′38″N 0°5′26″W

Cannon Street station rail crash
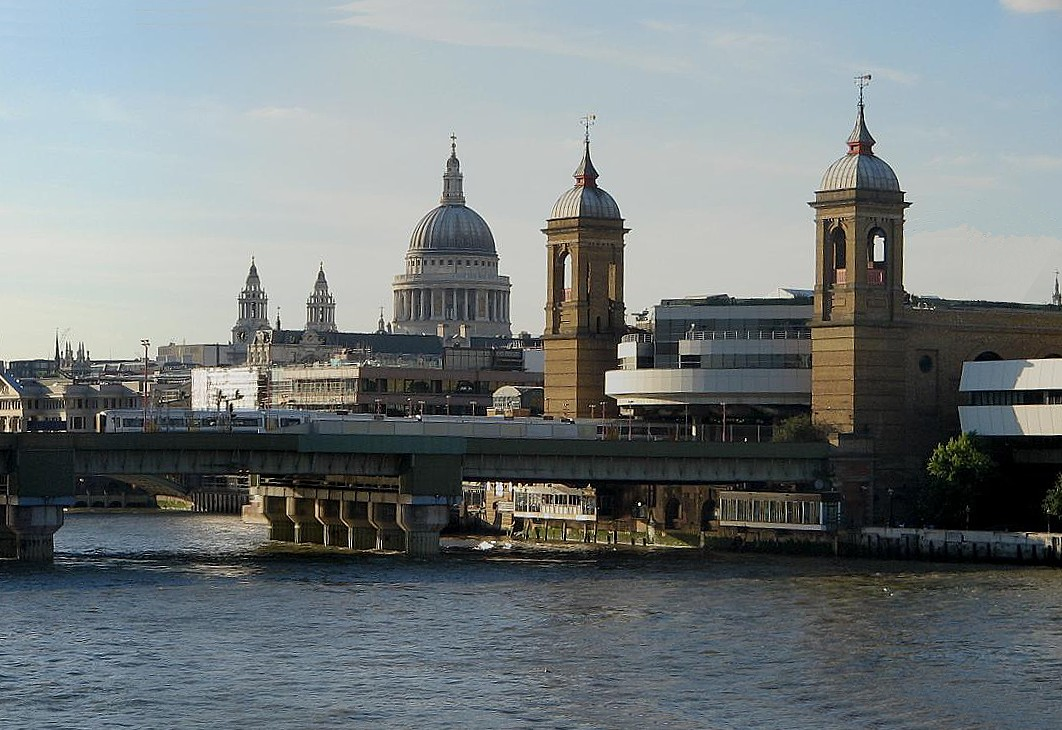

Details
- Date: 8 January 1991
- Location: Cannon Street station
- Country: England
- Operator: Network SouthEast
- Incident type: Collision
- Cause: Driver's error

Statistics
- Trains: 1
- Passengers: 832+
- Deaths: 2
- Injured: 542

On 8 January 1991, a packed commuter train failed to stop and collided with the buffers at Cannon Street station in London, United Kingdom, killing two and injuring 542. The cause was driver error, compounded by ageing carriages.

== Accident ==
The stopping service, composed of 10 cars of elderly Class 415 and Class 416 units 5618, 5484 and 6227, departed from Sevenoaks at 07:58, and had over 800 passengers on board after passing through the busy interchange at London Bridge. At 08:44 it collided with the buffer stop at the Cannon Street terminus within the City of London. The fifth and sixth carriages crushed into each other, lifting one off the tracks. A 24-year-old man, cut free from wreckage crushing his head and abdomen, died from a heart attack on the way to hospital. A 59-year-old woman died three days later from her injuries. 542 other passengers were injured, many because they had stood up ready to leave as the train entered the terminus platform. The inquiry put the impact speed at around 10 mph (16 km/h), higher than the rail operator's earlier estimates.

== Inquiry ==
A report was compiled of the accident by Her Majesty's Railway Inspectorate. No fault in the train's braking system could be found and the driver, Maurice Graham, was held to blame. He was not tested for drugs until three days after the accident, whereupon traces of cannabis were found in his system. The public inquiry found that there was insufficient evidence to prove drug use had caused the accident.

The inquiry found that the cause of the accident was solely that of driver error. The report also made the following observations:

- The age of the elderly trains increased the effect of the impact. Of the two coaches that suffered the worst damage, one was built on an underframe dating from 1934, having been refitted with a new body in 1953 and involved in a previous collision with a locomotive in 1958; the other was built on an underframe from 1928.
- The interior design of the coaches' fittings and the large number of slam doors could have resulted in weaknesses in the structure of the rolling stock.
- More research is needed on the effect of impacts on passengers, particularly standing passengers, on board commuter trains.
- Automatic Train Protection, or ATP, should be installed as quickly as practicably possible.
- On-train data recorders would make the finding of evidence easier following railway accidents.
- Legislation should be introduced to make it an offence for railway staff with safety responsibilities to be intoxicated while on duty. (The main cause of the Eltham Well Hall rail crash).
- Sliding buffer stops might have minimised the injury compared to the hydraulic buffer stops in this incident.
- Arrangements for the booking-on of staff should be reviewed (a recommendation also made in the report for the Eltham Well Hall rail crash).
