= Welling railway station =

National Rail station in London, England

Welling
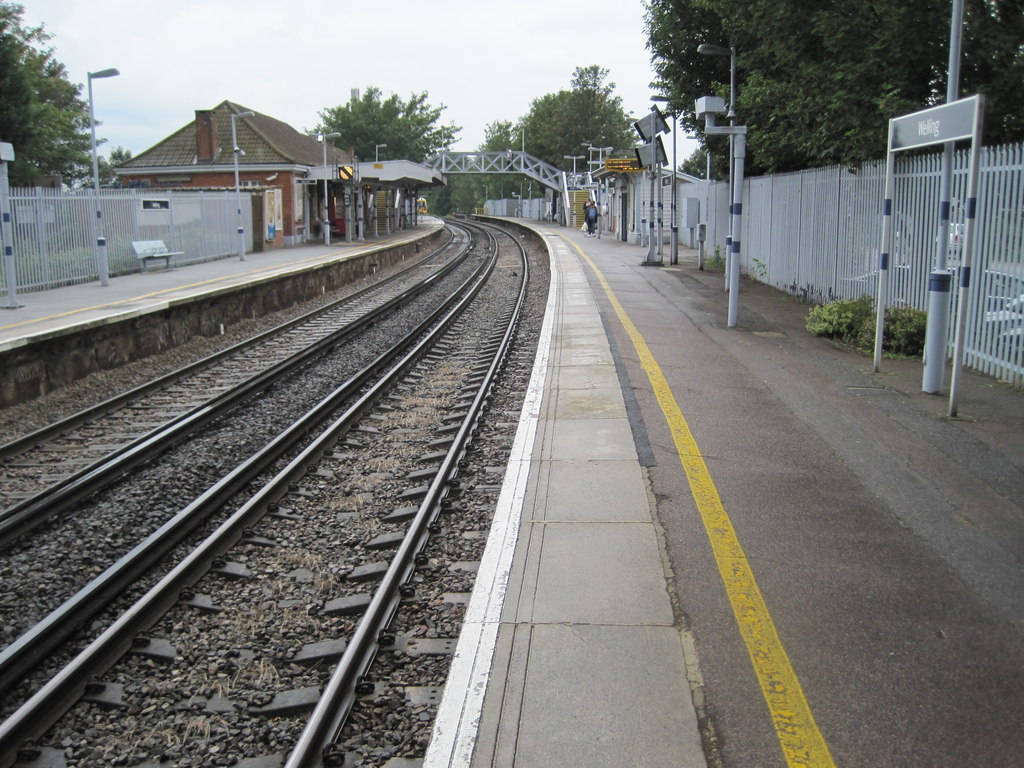
- Interactive map of Welling

General information
- Location: Welling
- Local authority: London Borough of Bexley
- Managed by: Southeastern
- Station code: WLI
- DfT category: C2
- Number of platforms: 2
- Accessible: Yes
- Fare zone: 4

National Rail annual entry and exit
- 2020–21: ▼0.638 million
- 2021–22: ▲1.331 million
- 2022–23: ▲1.382 million
- 2023–24: ▲1.426 million
- 2024–25: ▲1.528 million

Key dates
- 1 May 1895: Opened

Other information
- External links: Departures; Facilities
- Coordinates: 51.4647°N 0.1017°E

Welling railway station is situated in Welling, part of the London Borough of Bexley, and is served by the Bexleyheath Line, 11 miles 28 chains (18.3 km) from London Charing Cross.

The station was opened with the line on 1 May 1895. The station is located in Station Road, just off Bellegrove Road (which becomes Welling High Street). This is one of the stations on the line with original buildings: the offices here are on the Up side of the station. There are ticket barriers to both entrances.

== Services ==
All services at Welling are operated by Southeastern using Class 376, 465, 466 and 707 EMUs.

The typical off-peak service in trains per hour is:

- 2 tph to London Victoria
- 1 tph to London Charing Cross
- 2 tph to London Cannon Street
- 2 tph to Slade Green, continuing to London Cannon Street via Woolwich Arsenal and Greenwich
- 3 tph to Dartford

During the peak hours, the service between London Charing Cross and Dartford is increased to 2 tph in each direction.

Preceding station	National Rail	Following station
Falconwood	Southeastern Bexleyheath Line	Bexleyheath

== Connections ==
London Buses routes 51, 89, 96, 486, 624, 625, B15, B16 and night route N89 serve the station.
