= Falconwood railway station =

National Rail station in London, England

Falconwood
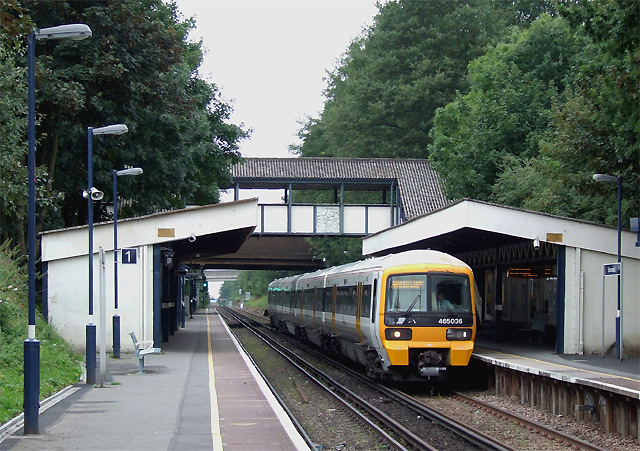
- Interactive map of Falconwood

General information
- Location: Falconwood
- Local authority: London Borough of Bexley
- Managed by: Southeastern
- Station code: FCN
- DfT category: D
- Number of platforms: 2
- Fare zone: 4

National Rail annual entry and exit
- 2020–21: ▼0.333 million
- 2021–22: ▲0.669 million
- 2022–23: ▲0.737 million
- 2023–24: ▲0.803 million
- 2024–25: ▲0.823 million

Key dates
- 1 January 1936: Opened

Other information
- External links: Departures; Facilities
- Coordinates: 51.4592°N 0.0799°E

Falconwood railway station is situated in the suburb of Falconwood, London Borough of Bexley, and is served by the Bexleyheath Line. It is 10 miles 27 chains (16.6 km) measured from London Charing Cross. The station was opened much later than the remainder of the line, on 1 January 1936, to serve a growing area. A brick-built ticket office leads down to the cutting in which the station lies. Ticket barriers control access to the platforms.

== Services ==
All services at Falconwood are operated by Southeastern using Class 376, 465, 466 and 707 EMUs.

The typical off-peak service in trains per hour is:

- 2 tph to London Victoria
- 1 tph to London Charing Cross
- 2 tph to London Cannon Street
- 2 tph to Slade Green, continuing to London Cannon Street via Woolwich Arsenal and Greenwich
- 3 tph to Dartford

During the peak hours, the service between London Charing Cross and Dartford is increased to 2 tph in each direction.

Preceding station	National Rail	Following station
Eltham	Southeastern Bexleyheath Line	Welling

== Connections ==
London Buses routes B15 and B16 serve the station.
