= London Borough of Bexley =

Coordinates: 51°27′N 0°08′E

- London borough
- Coat of arms Council logo
- Motto(s): Boldly and Rightly
- Bexley shown within Greater London
- Sovereign state: United Kingdom
- Constituent country: England
- Region: London
- Ceremonial county: Greater London
- Created: 1 April 1965
- Admin HQ: Bexleyheath

Government
  - Type: London borough council
  - Body: Bexley London Borough Council
  - London Assembly: Thomas Turrell AM for Bexley and Bromley
  - MPs: Abena Oppong-Asare (Labour); Daniel Francis (Labour); Louie French (Conservative)

Area
  - Total: 23.38 sq mi (60.56 km^{2})
  - Rank: 234th (of 296)

Population (2025)
  - Total: 257,103
  - Rank: 74th (of 296)
  - Density: 11,000/sq mi (4,245/km^{2})
- Time zone: UTC (GMT)
  - Summer (DST): UTC+1 (BST)
- Postcodes: DA, SE
- Area codes: 020, 01322
- ISO 3166 code: GB-BEX
- ONS code: 00AD
- GSS code: E09000004
- Police: Metropolitan Police
- Website: https://www.bexley.gov.uk/

The London Borough of Bexley (/ˈbɛksli/) is a London borough in south-east London, forming part of Outer London. It has a population of 248,287. The main settlements are Sidcup, Erith, Bexleyheath, Belvedere, Crayford, Welling and Old Bexley. The London Borough of Bexley is within the Thames Gateway, an area designated as a national priority for urban regeneration. The local authority is Bexley London Borough Council.

== History ==
Prior to the 19th century the area now forming the borough was sparsely populated: very few of the present settlements were mentioned in the Domesday Book, although the village of Bexley has a charter dated 814 AD. Erith was a port on the River Thames until the 17th century; the opening of the sewage works at nearby Crossness in the late 19th century turned it into an industrial town.

Today's settlement pattern is the result of the gradual extension of the London influence. Until the 19th century it was an area with a few isolated buildings such as the Georgian Danson House. With the coming of the railways building began apace, although the area is still composed of many disconnected settlements, interspersed with area of open ground and parks.

=== Administrative history ===
A local government district called Bexley was created in 1880, covering the parish of Bexley, which included both Bexley village and Bexleyheath. Another local government district had been created covering the neighbouring parish of Erith in 1876. Such districts were converted into urban districts under the Local Government Act 1894.

Bexley Urban District absorbed the neighbouring parish of East Wickham in 1902; Welling had previously straddled the boundary between Bexley and East Wickham, but after 1902 was therefore wholly in Bexley. Crayford was made an urban district in 1920. Bexley was made a municipal borough in 1935, as was Erith in 1938.

The modern borough was created in 1965 under the London Government Act 1963, covering the combined area of the former boroughs of Bexley and Erith, the Crayford Urban District and the Sidcup area from the Chislehurst and Sidcup Urban District (the Chislehurst area went to the London Borough of Bromley). The area was transferred from Kent to Greater London, to become one of the 32 London boroughs.

== Coat of arms ==
The coat of arms of the borough depicts symbols for the main rivers in the area, the Bexley Charter Oak, the industry and the Kent boundary.

== Governance ==
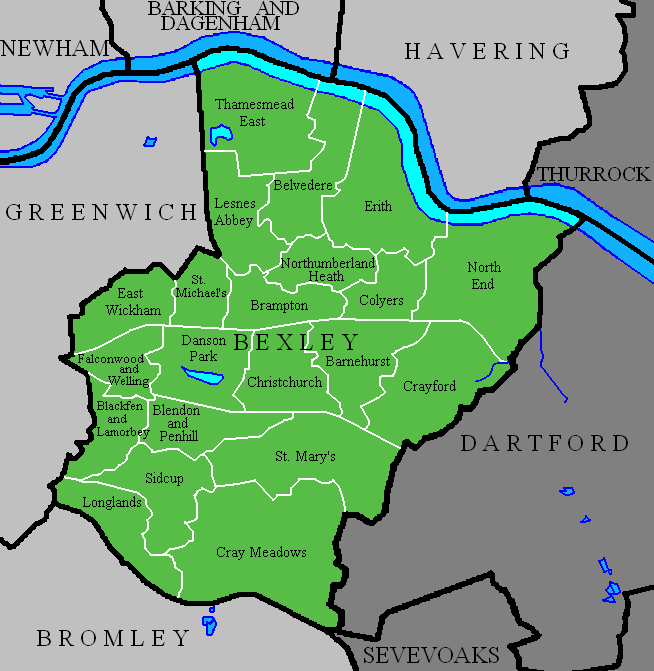
The 17 wards of the London Borough of Bexley used from 2002 to 2018 (green) and surrounding London boroughs (light grey) and other districts (dark grey)

=== Bexley London Borough Council ===
The local authority is Bexley Council, which has its headquarters at the Bexley Civic Offices in Bexleyheath.

=== Greater London representation ===
Since 2000, for elections to the London Assembly, the borough forms part of the Bexley and Bromley constituency.

== Geography ==
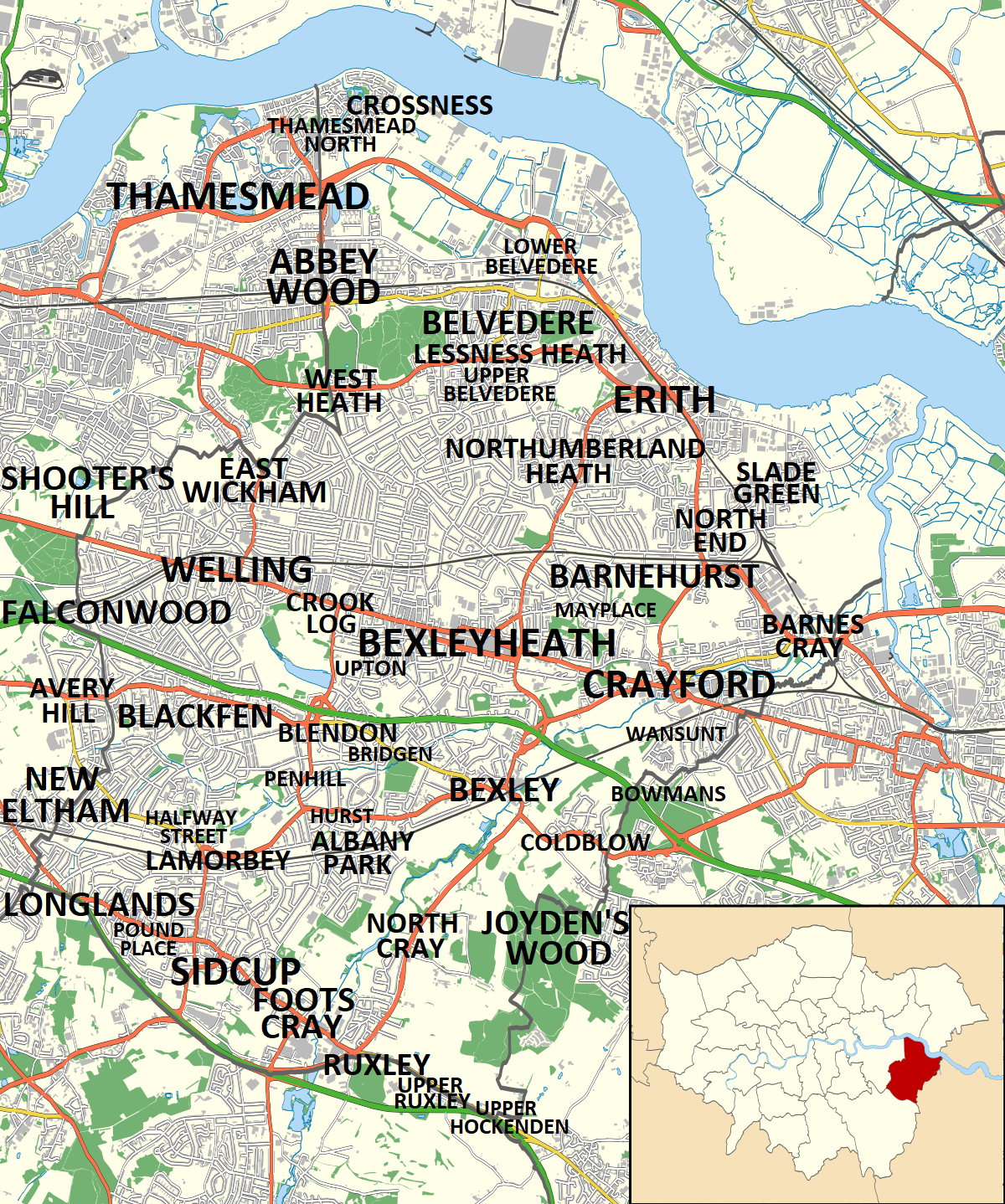
Location map for Bexley

Bexley, lying as it does on the outer fringe of London, has many relatively large areas of open space. The ridge of higher ground in South London crosses the Borough from its high point of Shooters Hill, on the boundary with the Royal Borough of Greenwich, to end above the River Thames at Belvedere, where the land drops down to the old port of Erith. This high land, whose geology is the sand and pebbles of the Blackheath beds, and which results in heathland, provided a natural course for the old Roman road of Watling Street, which ran between Crayford and Welling. The land falls away to the north of the high ground, across the Erith Marshes to the River Thames, which here makes a loop to the north at Crossness. There is a further ridge of less higher ground from the west terminating at Sidcup.

Apart from the River Thames the other rivers within the Borough are the River Darent, which, with its tributary the River Cray and the smaller Stanham River, all form part of its north-eastern boundary; and the River Shuttle, a tributary of the Cray.

The major centres of settlement can be considered in two parts: the older established erstwhile villages; and the infill areas of suburban houses and centres. Among the former are Erith, in the 17th century a port on the Thames, and an industrial town in the later 19th century; Bexleyheath, created at the same time on the London to Dover road. By the earlier 20th century, both were created Urban District Councils (UDC), as was Foots Cray (an ancient village site). Thamesmead, the "new town" built on what was the Erith Marshes, extends into the Borough: both Thamesmead North and South are located here. Crayford was mentioned in the Domesday Book, and its parish later included the hamlets of North End and Slade Green.

Other settlements include Welling, which has a higher population than Bexleyheath, a staging post on the Dover Road, which was at one time of less importance than the nearby East Wickham (also an ancient village), was absorbed in Bexley UDC. Barnes Cray and North Cray were two hamlets in the Cray Valley; and Belvedere was the location of a medieval monastery.

The map of Bexley shows that a large proportion of its area comprises suburbia. Some named places, like Albany Park and Barnehurst, are names given to developments engendered by the building of the railways. Some came into being when large estates and farmland were broken up for the sole purpose of suburban building: these include Blackfen, Lamorbey and part of Falconwood. Others simply reflect the nature of area: Lessness Heath; Longlands (part of Sidcup); Northumberland Heath and West Heath.

The borough has boundaries with the London Borough of Bromley to the south and the Royal Borough of Greenwich to the west; across the River Thames to the north it borders the London Borough of Havering and London Borough of Barking and Dagenham; there is a short boundary with the unitary authority of Thurrock in Essex to the northeast. There are boundaries with the Borough of Dartford to the east and Sevenoaks district to the southeast, both in the county of Kent.

=== Open spaces ===
Despite the suburbia mentioned above, there are still open spaces among the borough's streets and avenues. The Borough owns and maintains over one hundred parks and open spaces, large and small; and there is still a part of the Erith Marshes bordering the River Thames. The Crayford Marshes lie to the east of that river, as do Foots Cray Meadows further south.

The largest of the open spaces are Foots Cray Meadows, Lesnes Abbey Woods, Danson Park and Hall Place Gardens. There are also many golf courses and sports fields, particularly to the west of Crayford.

=== Hall Place ===
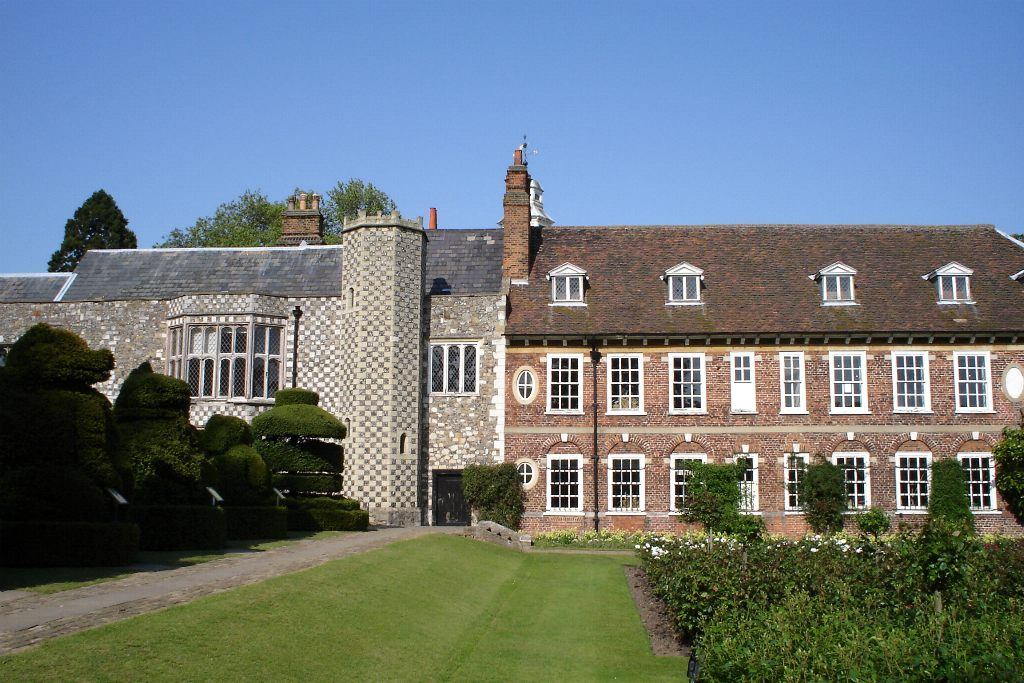
Hall Place, with 16th- (left) and 17th-century wings.

Hall Place is a former stately home, today a Grade I listed building and Scheduled Ancient Monument, beside the River Cray on the outskirts of Crayford, south-east of Bexleyheath and north-east of Old Bexley. It is situated just off the A223, Bourne Road, south of Watling Street (A207) and north of the Black Prince interchange of the A2 Rochester Way with the A220.

The house dates back to around 1540 when wealthy merchant Sir John Champneys, Lord Mayor of London in 1534, built himself a country house. In 1649, the house was sold to another wealthy City merchant, Sir Robert Austen (1587–1666), who added a second wing built of red bricks, doubling the size of the house.

Currently, the building houses a museum of local artefacts, and a history and tourist information centre. In the gardens there is a topiary lawn, herb garden, tropical garden and long herbaceous cottage garden-styled borders. The former walled gardens include a tropical house housing plants and a large vegetable garden. Model gardens have been created to show visitors how to make use of space in small urban gardens. Hall Place also has three galleries inside the house, presenting art exhibitions and museum displays.

== Demographics ==
Population pyramid of the Borough of Bexley in 2021

Population
Year	Pop.	±%
1801	4,165	—
1811	5,164	+24.0%
1821	6,279	+21.6%
1831	7,725	+23.0%
1841	9,616	+24.5%
1851	10,963	+14.0%
1861	16,477	+50.3%
1871	21,991	+33.5%
1881	27,505	+25.1%
1891	35,728	+29.9%
1901	46,904	+31.3%
1911	61,582	+31.3%
1921	77,747	+26.2%
1931	98,160	+26.3%
1941	139,861	+42.5%
1951	199,297	+42.5%
1961	208,138	+4.4%
1971	217,375	+4.4%
1981	214,352	−1.4%
1991	219,422	+2.4%
2001	218,307	−0.5%
2011	231,997	+6.3%
2024 estimate	256,434	+10.5%
Source: A Vision of Britain through time 2024 estimate

In 1801, the civil parishes that form the modern borough had a total population of 4,165. This rose slowly throughout the 19th century, as the district became built up; reaching 10,963 in the middle of the century. When the railways arrived the rate of population growth increased. The population peaked in the 1970s, when industry began to relocate from London.

In the 2001 census, the borough had a population of 218,307; of whom 105,148 were male, and 113,159 female. Of the population, 44.3% were in full-time employment and 11.6% in part-time employment – compared to a London average of 42.6% and 8.6%, respectively. Residents were predominantly owner-occupiers, with 31.7% owning their house outright, and a further 46.5% owning with a mortgage. Only 2.2% were in local authority housing, with a further 11.5% renting from a housing association, or other registered social landlord.

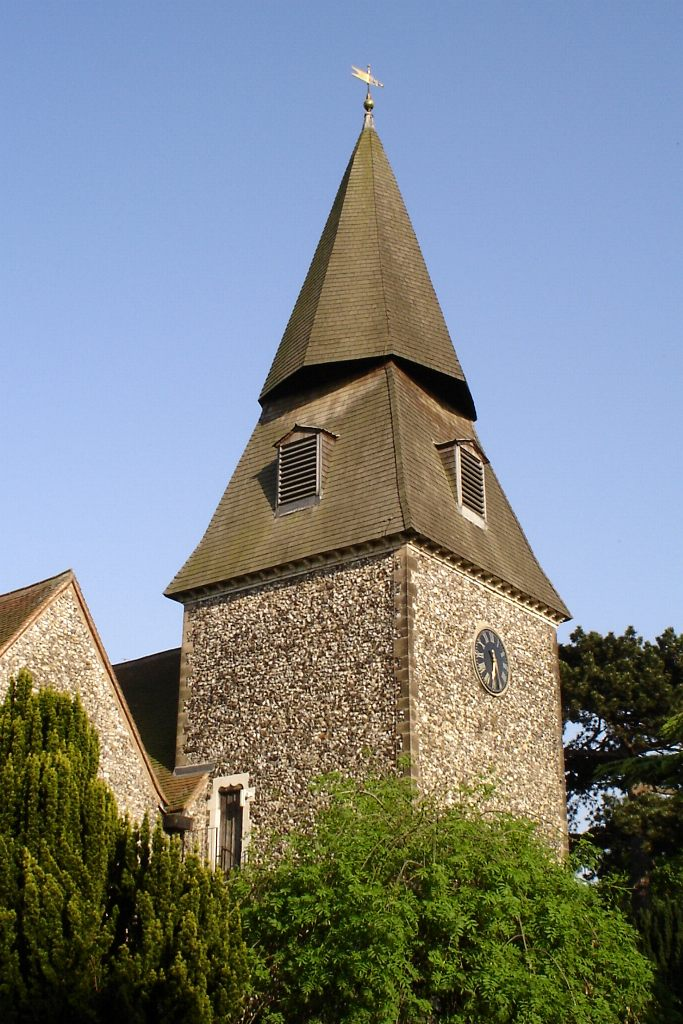
The distinctive spire of the ancient parish church of St Mary the Virgin in Bexley

The greater part of the population are nominal Anglicans, but there are a number of Roman Catholic churches and nonconformist congregations. In the 2001 Census, 22.7% of the area's population described themselves as non-religious or chose not to state their faith.

Baptists, Plymouth Brethren, and Methodists are among the other congregations. In 2008 the former Crayford Methodist Church was purchased by the North West Kent Muslim Association to become a mosque serving Bexley and Dartford boroughs.

In 2011, 58.1% of Bexley's population was between 20 and 64 years old, the lowest percentage in London. 16% of the population was over 65, the third highest behind Bromley and Havering. The average household size is 2.49, up from 2.43 in 2001. The number of households increased by 3.52% to 92,600 between 2001 and 2011, one of the lowest increases in the capital.

In 2011, 62.5% of the borough's population identified themselves as Christian, with 24.1% having no religion. Both figures are above London's average.

The following table shows the ethnic group of respondents in the 2001 and 2011 census in Bexley.

=== Ethnicity ===
Ethnic Group	Year											
Ethnic Group	1971 estimations		1981 estimations		1991 census		2001 census		2011 census		2021 census	
Ethnic Group	Number	%	Number	%	Number	%	Number	%	Number	%	Number	%
White: Total	–	98.1%	204,367	95.8%	203,117	94.2%	199,510	91.39%	189,962	81.88%	177,164	71.8%
White: British	–	–	–	–	–	–	191,947	87.93%	179,250	77.26%	158,842	64.4%
White: Irish	–	–	–	–	–	–	3,025	1.39%	2,596	1.12%	2,528	1.0%
White: Gypsy or Irish Traveller	–	–	–	–	–	–	–	–	624	0.27%	620	0.3%
White: Roma	–	–	–	–	–	–	–	–	–	–	302	0.1%
White: Other	–	–	–	–	–	–	4,538	2.08%	7,492	3.23%	14,872	6.0%
Asian or Asian British: Total	–	–	–	–	8,133	3.8%	8,934	4.09%	15,243	6.57%	24,434	9.9%
Asian or Asian British: Indian	–	–	–	–	5231		5,548	2.54%	7,047	3.04%	10,925	4.4%
Asian or Asian British: Pakistani	–	–	–	–	267		334	0.15%	730	0.31%	1,383	0.6%
Asian or Asian British: Bangladeshi	–	–	–	–	282		386	0.18%	777	0.33%	1,790	0.7%
Asian or Asian British: Chinese	–	–	–	–	1201		1,555	0.71%	2,514	1.08%	3,990	1.6%
Asian or Asian British: Other Asian	–	–	–	–	1152		1,111	0.51%	4,175	1.80%	6,346	2.6%
Black or Black British: Total	–	–	–	–	3,012	1.4%	6,252	2.86%	19,624	8.46%	30,075	12.2%
Black or Black British: African	–	–	–	–	918	0.4%	4,085	1.87%	15,952	6.88%	23,262	9.4%
Black or Black British: Caribbean	–	–	–	–	1466		1,762	0.81%	2,381	1.03%	3,230	1.3%
Black or Black British: Other Black	–	–	–	–	628		405	0.19%	1,291	0.56%	3,583	1.5%
Mixed or British Mixed: Total	–	–	–	–	–	–	2,872	1.32%	5,395	2.33%	8,740	3.6%
Mixed: White and Black Caribbean	–	–	–	–	–	–	868	0.40%	1,676	0.72%	2,489	1.0%
Mixed: White and Black African	–	–	–	–	–	–	394	0.18%	983	0.42%	1,726	0.7%
Mixed: White and Asian	–	–	–	–	–	–	915	0.42%	1,369	0.59%	2,179	0.9%
Mixed: Other Mixed	–	–	–	–	–	–	695	0.32%	1,367	0.59%	2,346	1.0%
Other: Total	–	–	–	–	1353	0.62%	739	0.34%	1,773	0.76%	6,062	2.4%
Other: Arab	–	–	–	–	–	–	–	–	303	0.13%	527	0.2%
Other: Any other ethnic group	–	–	–	–	1353	0.62%	–	–	1,470	0.63%	5,535	2.2%
Ethnic minority: Total	–	1.9%	8,931	4.2%	12,498	5.82%	18,797	8.61%	42,035	18.12%	69,311	28.2%
Total	–	100%	213,298	100%	215,615	100%	218,307	100.00%	231,997	100.00%	246,475	100%

=== Religion ===
Religion	2021	
Religion	Number	%
Christian	123,908	50,27%
Muslim	9,721	3,94%
Hindu	7,516	3,05%
Buddhist	2,048	0,83%
Sikh	5,272	2,14%
Jewish	217	0,09%
Other religion	988	0,4%
No religion	82,816	33,6%
Religion not stated	13,986	5,67%
Total	246,472	100%

=== Immigration ===
This list includes top-15 sources of immigration to Borough of Bexley for 2021 census:

#	Country	Number
1	Nigeria	8,831
2	India	5,488
3	Romania	2,415
4	Poland	2,082
5	Ireland	1,871
6	Ghana	1,640
7	Sri Lanka	1,309
8	Lithuania	1,280
9	Nepal	1,203
10	Bulgaria	1,198
11	China	1,143
12	Italy	1,018
13	Bangladesh	829
14	Kenya	826
15	Hong Kong	744

== Transport ==
=== Roads and paths ===
The principal roads through the Borough include the A2 trunk road; the A20 (Sidcup By-pass) which generally marks its southern boundary; the A207, which is the route of the erstwhile Watling Street; the A206 which takes traffic from Woolwich and Dartford; and the latter's newer counterpart, the A2016 through Thamesmead.

There are also some long-distance footpaths in the Borough: among them the Thames Path and the London Outer Orbital Path. Bexley Borough has joined with three other adjoining boroughs to for the South East London Green Chain linking green spaces.

=== Rail ===
Bexley is not served by any London Underground, Tramlink, Docklands Light Railway or London Overground services. However, since 2022, Elizabeth line services have started to utilise a terminus at Abbey Wood, the entrance to which is in Bexley (due to the borough boundary passing through the site, the station's platforms sit within the Royal Borough of Greenwich). There are various proposals to extend either the DLR or London Overground to Thamesmead. There are currently no plans to extend the London Underground into the borough, with the nearest current station being in North Greenwich.

There are three suburban railway lines crossing the Borough which converge at Dartford. The most northerly is the North Kent Line, then the Bexleyheath Line which runs through the centre of the borough and then finally the Dartford Loop Line which runs furthest south. Abbey Wood and Slade Green are also served by Thameslink trains.

The National Rail stations are:

- Abbey Wood
- Albany Park
- Barnehurst
- Belvedere
- Bexley
- Bexleyheath
- Crayford
- Erith
- Falconwood
- Sidcup
- Slade Green
- Welling

=== Modes of travel ===
In 2019, the mode share in Bexley was reported as follows

Mode share in Bexley
Mode	Share
Car/motorcycle	57%
Walking	24%
Cycling	1%
Bus/Tram	12%
Taxi/other	1%

According to a report from Transport for London, Bexley has the lowest overall active, efficient and sustainable mode shares of all the London Boroughs.

== Religion ==
=== Religious affiliation ===
The following Pie chart shows the religious affiliation of residents residing in Bexley.

Religion in Bexley (2021 census)
1. Christianity (50.3%)
2. No religion (33.6%)
3. Islam (3.90%)
4. Hinduism (3.00%)
5. Sikhism (2.10%)
6. Judaism (0.10%)
7. Buddhism (0.80%)
8. Other religions (0.40%)
9. Not Stated (5.70%)

=== Places of worship ===
Buildings with Grade II listings (buildings of special interest warranting preservation) are marked with an asterisk *

- All Saints' Church – near Foots Cray Meadows, building dates from c. 1330*
- Bethany Hall – Chapel Road, Bexleyheath, now a meeting house of the Plymouth Brethren though originally a Methodist chapel
- Christ Church – in Erith, built in the 19th century, has a distinctive tower built by J. P. St. Aubyn*
- The Greek Orthodox Church of Christ the Saviour – dates from the late 12th or early 13th century, in Welling*
- St James' Church – in North Cray, in a conservation area near Foots Cray Meadows, has foundations from the 12th century
- St John the Baptist Church – nearly a thousand years old, in Erith
- St Mary the Virgin Church (also called Old Bexley Church) – in Bexley, dates back to the Domesday Survey*
- St Paulinus' Church – built in the 12th century on earlier foundations, in Crayford

== Public services ==
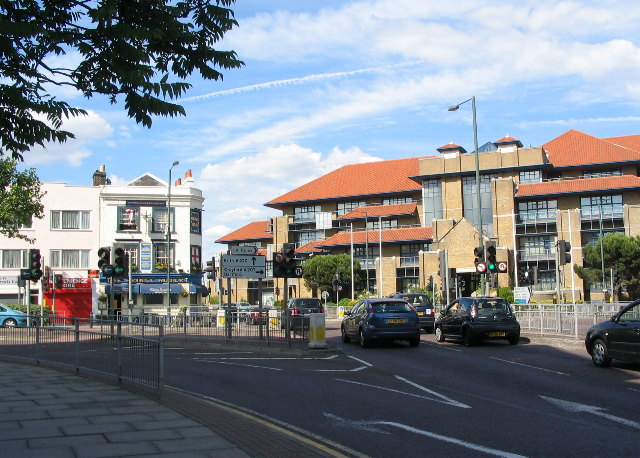
Bexley Civic Offices

The London Borough of Bexley has three fire stations controlled by the London Fire Brigade within its boundary: those at Erith, Sidcup and Bexley. Bexley fire station's ground is the largest of the three; covering 23.7 km^{2}.

== Sport and leisure ==
The Borough has several Non-League football clubs:

- Welling United F.C., which play at Park View Road in Welling
- Phoenix Sports F.C., which play at Phoenix Sports Ground in Barnehurst
- VCD Athletic F.C. who played at The Oakwood, Old Road in Crayford
- Welling Town F.C., who play at Bayliss Avenue, Thamesmead
- Erith & Belvedere F.C., which play at Park View Road in Welling
- Erith Town F.C., which play at Erith Stadium in Erith

Bexley RFC

== Twinning ==
The borough is twinned with:

- Évry, France
- Arnsberg, Germany
- Footscray, Victoria, Australia

== Other places named Bexley ==
The town of Bexley, Ohio, a suburb of the state capital, Columbus, was named at the suggestion of an early resident, James Kilbourne, whose family's roots were in Bexley, England. In addition, a suburb of Sydney, Australia bears the name of Bexley and a suburb of Christchurch, New Zealand is also called Bexley. These places outside England are named after the ancient village of Bexley.
