= Municipal Borough of Bexley =

Abolished 1965

Coordinates: 51°27′N 0°9′E

Bexley
- Area
  - 1911: 4,942 acres (20.00 km^{2})
  - 1961: 4,870 acres (19.7 km^{2})
- Population
  - 1901: 13,476
  - 1961: 89,550
- History
  - Created: 1880
  - Abolished: 1965
  - Succeeded by: London Borough of Bexley
- Status: Local board (1880–1894); Urban district (1894–1935); Municipal borough (after 1935)
- Government
  - HQ: Oak House, Broadway
  - Motto: Non Nobis Sed Communitati (Not for ourselves but for the community)

Bexley was a local government district in north west Kent from 1880 to 1965 covering the parish of Bexley, which included both Bexley village and Bexleyheath.

== History ==
The parish of Bexley adopted the Local Government Act 1858 in 1880, and a local board of 15 members was formed to govern the area. The local board established offices at Oxford Place, High Street, Bexley.

The Local Government Act 1894 reconstituted the local board's area as an urban district. Bexley Urban District Council replaced the board. In 1902 the urban district was enlarged by absorbing the neighbouring parish of East Wickham, formerly in Dartford Rural District. The enlarged urban district was divided into three wards: Christ Church (returning 8 councillors), St Mary's (5) and East Wickham (2). The Council offices moved to Oak House on the south side of the Broadway, Bexleyheath in 1903.

The urban district council ran its own tram services until they became the responsibility of the London Passenger Transport Board in 1933.

The town was incorporated as a municipal borough in 1935. The royal charter was presented by the Lord Lieutenant of Kent in a ceremony held in Danson Park on 30 September. A corporation consisting of a mayor, 6 aldermen and 18 councillors replaced the UDC, with the first elections being held on 1 November.

In 1965 the municipal borough was abolished by the London Government Act 1963 and its former area transferred to Greater London from Kent. Its former area was combined with that of other districts to form the present-day London Borough of Bexley.

== Borough council ==
The borough council was initially controlled by independents. In 1945 the Labour Party gained a majority. The Conservative Party took control in 1950, which they held until 1958. The size of the council had been increased to 24 councillors and 8 aldermen in 1954, and in 1958 the council was evenly divided between Labour and Conservatives. The Conservatives regained control in 1959, holding it until 1963. At the final election before the borough's abolition in 1965, Labour took control.

== Coat of arms ==
A coat of arms was granted to the Bexley UDC on 16 October 1937 and inherited by the borough. The blazon was as follows: Per fesse vert and Or a fesse wavy barry wavy of four argent and azure in chief an eagle displayed between two apples leaved and slipped of the second and in base an oak tree eradicated proper. Crest: Upon heather proper within a coronet of four fleur-de-lis set upon a rim Or a horse forcene argent.

The green and gold colouring of the arms represented the cornfields and grasslands which covered the area before the town grew up. The oak tree continued this theme, and also depicted the town's parks. The blue and silver waves or "becks" referred to the name "Bexley". Gold apples stood for traditional fruit-growing and the eagle came from the arms of Nicholas Vansittart, 1st Baron Bexley, one time chancellor of the exchequer. The crown was included in the crest as the arms were granted in the year of the coronation of King George VI and Queen Elizabeth. The crest was the white horse of Kent on a mound of heather for former heath lands of Bexleyheath.

The Latin motto was Non Nobis Sed Communitati or "Not for ourselves but for the community".
