= East Wickham =

Coordinates: 51.469°N 0.096°E

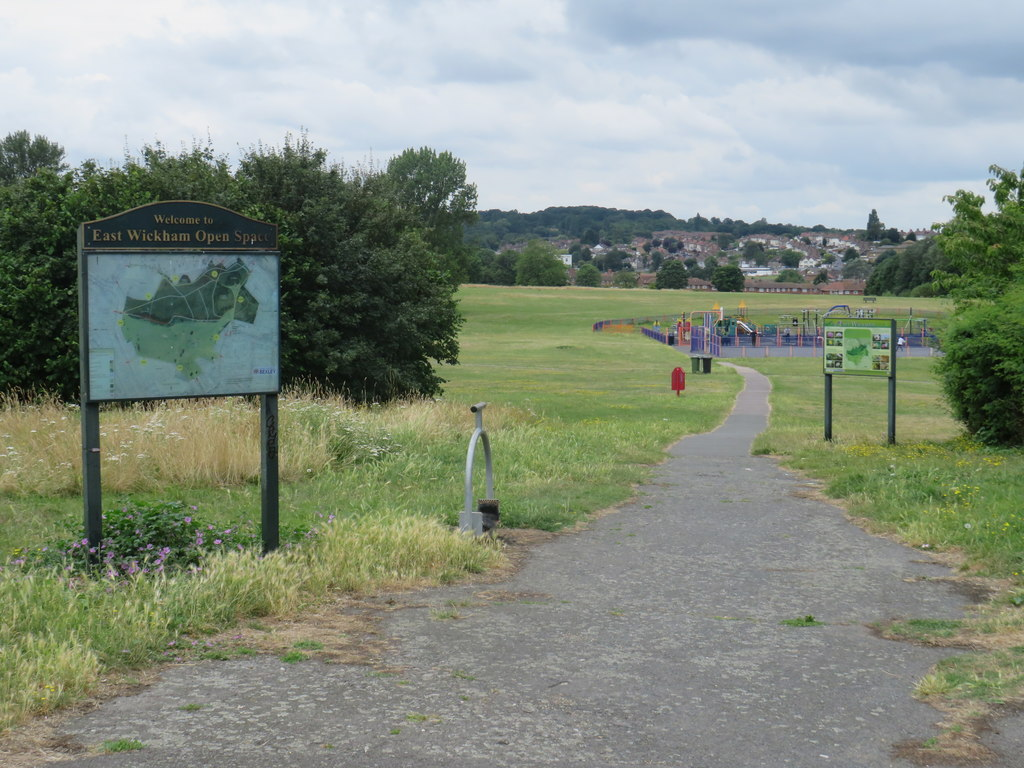
- East Wickham Open Space

- Location within Greater London
- Area: 0.83 sq mi (2.1 km^{2})
- Population: 10,858 (2011)
  - Density: 13,082/sq mi (5,051/km^{2})
- OS grid reference: TQ455765
  - Charing Cross: 10.5 mi (16.9 km) WNW
- London borough: Bexley
- Ceremonial county: Greater London
- Region: London
- Country: England
- Sovereign state: United Kingdom
- Post town: WELLING
- Postcode district: DA16
- Dialling code: 020
- Police: Metropolitan
- Fire: London
- Ambulance: London
- UK Parliament: Old Bexley and Sidcup
- London Assembly: Bexley and Bromley

East Wickham is a district in south-east London, England, within the London Borough of Bexley. It is situated north of Welling, east of Shooter's Hill, south of Plumstead, south-west of Abbey Wood and west of West Heath, and 10.5 miles (16.9 km) east-southeast of Charing Cross. Prior to the creation of Greater London in 1965, East Wickham was in the administrative county of Kent.

== History ==
The name is thought to be a corruption of the Latin 'vicus', indicating a Roman settlement along Watling Street, with the place name 'Estwycham' first being recorded in 1284. The 'east' was added to differentiate it from West Wickham, situated some distance away to the south-west.

The larger settlement of Welling originally formed part of the ancient manor of East Wickham, which was centred on St Michael's Church, Upper Wickham Lane, built in the 13th century. In the Domesday Book (1086) East Wickham was included as part of the return for Plumstead and the church was originally a chapel of St Nicholas' Church in Plumstead, within the Little and Lesnes Hundred. It became a civil parish in its own right in 1854 and formed part of Dartford Rural District from 1894. It ceased to be a civil parish on 1 October 1902 and merged with Bexley and became part of Bexley Urban District. At the 1901 census (the last before the abolition of the parish), East Wickham had a population of 1661. The area was largely rural in character until the early 20th century, with large scale house building beginning in the area from 1916 onwards.

== Transport ==
Several Transport for London bus services connect East Wickham with areas including Welling, Eltham, Bexleyheath, Plumstead, Woolwich, Abbey Wood, North Greenwich, Thamesmead and Dartford. The nearest rail link to the area is Welling railway station.

== Politics and government ==
East Wickham is part of the Old Bexley and Sidcup constituency for elections to the House of Commons of the United Kingdom, currently represented by Louie French from the Conservative Party.

East Wickham is part of the East Wickham ward for elections to London Borough of Bexley.

== Notable residents ==
- Kate Bush, singer-songwriter.
