= Bexleyheath line =

Railway line in England

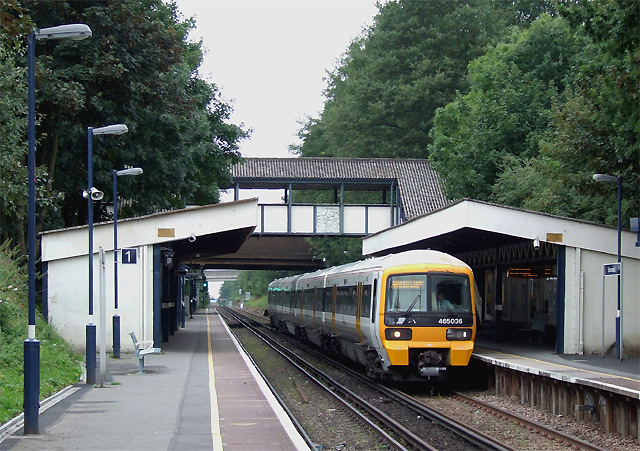
- Falconwood Station, 2008

Overview
- Status: Operating
- Owner: Network Rail
- Locale: Greater London
- Termini: Lewisham; Dartford

Service
- Type: Heavy rail
- System: National Rail
- Operator: Southeastern
- Rolling stock: British Rail Class 376; British Rail Class 465; British Rail Class 466; British Rail Class 707

Technical
- Number of tracks: 2
- Track gauge: 4 ft 8 1/2 in (1,435 mm) standard gauge
- Electrification: 750 V DC third rail
Route map
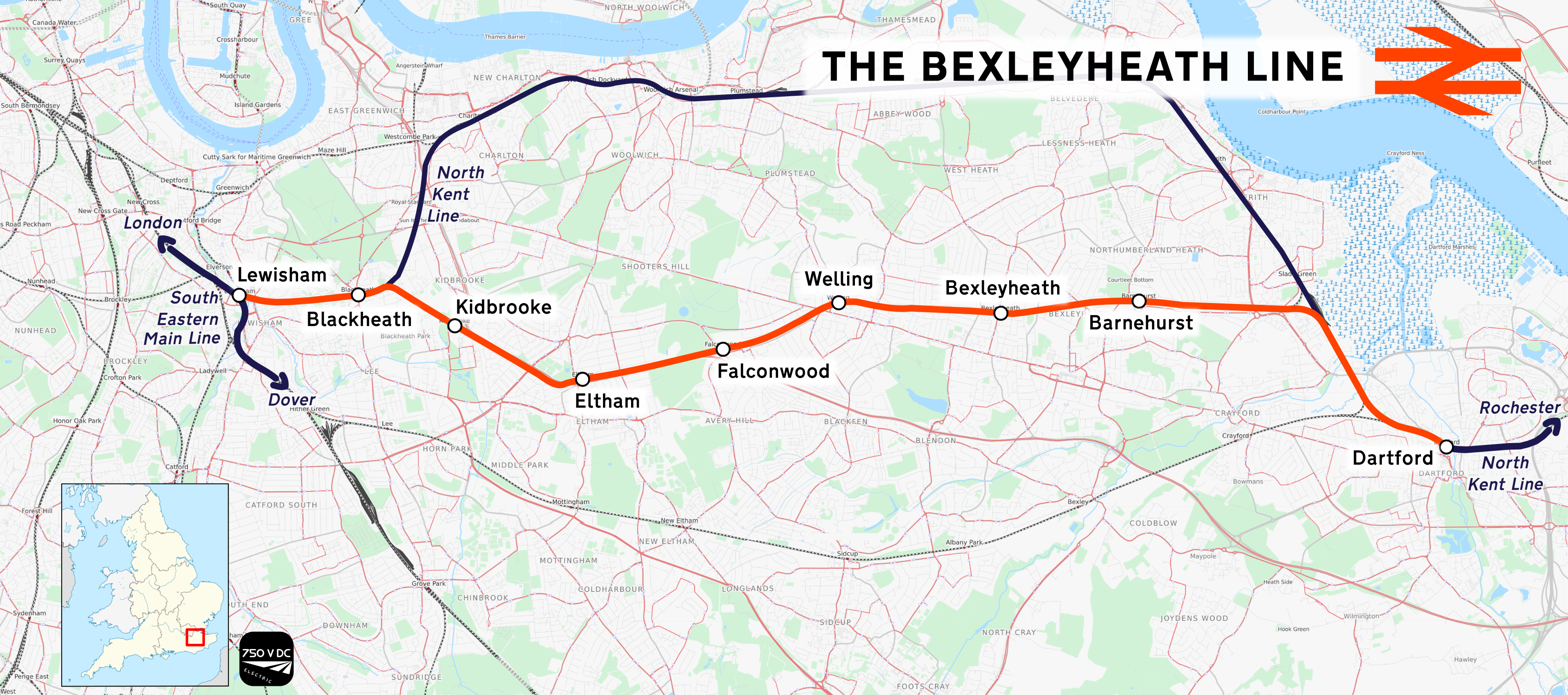

The Bexleyheath line runs for 8 miles (13 km) from Lewisham to Dartford in Kent. It separates from the North Kent Line just to the east of Blackheath Station, and rejoins the same line just south of Slade Green near Dartford.

== History ==
Bexley Heath Railway Act 1883
- Act of Parliament
- Parliament of the United Kingdom
- Long title: An Act for authorising the construction of a railway in the County of Kent to be called the Bexley Heath Railway and for other purposes.
- Citation: 46 & 47 Vict. c. clxxxvi

Dates
- Royal assent: 20 August 1883

Text of statute as originally enacted

Bexley Heath Railway Act 1887
- Act of Parliament
- Parliament of the United Kingdom
- Long title: An Act to authorise the Bexley Heath Railway Company to extend their railway to Blackheath to abandon a portion of their authorised railway and for other purposes.
- Citation: 50 & 51 Vict. c. lxxx

Dates
- Royal assent: 5 July 1887

Text of statute as originally enacted

The line was first proposed in 1881, when Squire Jones, of East Wickham, organised a petition to persuade South Eastern Railway to build a railway to Bexleyheath. This led to the formation, on 20 August 1883, of the Bexley Heath Railway Company, led by railway engineer Alfred Bean (owner of Danson House), composed of local land-owners seeking to raise the value of their land for housing development. The company secured an act of Parliament to build the line, the Bexley Heath Railway Act 1883 (46 & 47 Vict. c. clxxxvi), routed via Lee. However, this was followed by disputes between the two companies, and disagreements over the final route, and the Bexley Heath Railway Act 1887 (50 & 51 Vict. c. lxxx) was passed authorising the construction of a line along a new route, via Blackheath, including the construction of a 1-mile (1.6 km) tunnel at the eastern entrance to Blackheath station. The project subsequently fell into financial difficulties, and it was not until 1891 that work on the line finally commenced, with the construction contract awarded to a Mr Rigby.

After yet another delay due to a landslide at Blackheath in 1894, the Bexleyheath Line was finally opened on 1 May 1895, running 12 trains per day to and from Charing Cross. The opening day was marked by a brass band marching from Bexleyheath to Barnehurst stations, before returning by train. Shareholders of the new line included: Charles Beadle, a coal and corn merchant; George Mence Smith, oil trader and hardware store owner; and Alfred Bean. However, the company soon went into bankruptcy, and in 1900 the South Eastern Railway – which had previously refused to build a line to serve the area between the two lines – was forced to take over.

The line originally included five stations: Kidbrooke, Eltham Well Hall, Welling, Bexleyheath and Barnehurst, all rudimentary wooden structures. A more elaborate station was opened at Eltham Park in 1908 to cater for first-class passengers from the Eltham Park Estate. The line was electrified with the other South Eastern and Chatham Railway local routes to Dartford on 6 June 1926 by Southern Railway. Having initially been built to serve very rural areas, Well Hall, Welling, Bexleyheath and Barnehurst were rebuilt in 1932 to cater for the huge suburban expansion into the area of the 1930s, and Falconwood was added in 1936.

On 11 June 1972, a train derailed on a sharp curve at Eltham Well Hall station, resulting in 5 deaths and 126 injuries.

Kidbrooke station was rebuilt in 1972 as a CLASP prefabricated structure. This was replaced by a brick construction in 1994, and a further rebuild was opened in 2021. In 1985, the new Eltham railway station replaced the two existing stations (Well Hall and Eltham Park) serving Eltham. The changes coincided with the opening of the new Rochester Way Relief Road, which forms part of the A2 road.

In the 2010s, there were multiple landslips on the line, including one which closed the line for at least a week from 11 February 2019. The Bexleyheath line was temporarily closed between 15 and 23 February 2020, to allow for rail improvement works to prevent further landslips in the Barnehurst area of the line.

== Service patterns ==
Train services are operated by Southeastern. Services run to London Charing Cross, London Cannon Street or London Victoria.

The Monday-Sunday off-peak service is:

- 2 tph between London Victoria and Gravesend calling Denmark Hill, Peckham Rye, Nunhead, Lewisham, all stations to Dartford via Bexleyheath, Greenhithe and Gravesend.
- 2 tph between London Cannon Street and Barnehurst calling at all stations. This service returns to Cannon Street calling at all stations via Woolwich Arsenal and Greenwich. This service also operates in the clockwise direction with the same frequency
