= Parks and open spaces in the London Borough of Bexley =

The London Borough of Bexley owns and maintains over 100 parks and open spaces within its boundaries, with a total of 638 hectares (1,580 acres). They include small gardens, river and woodland areas, and large parks with many sporting and other facilities.

== Large parks ==
=== Foots Cray Meadows ===
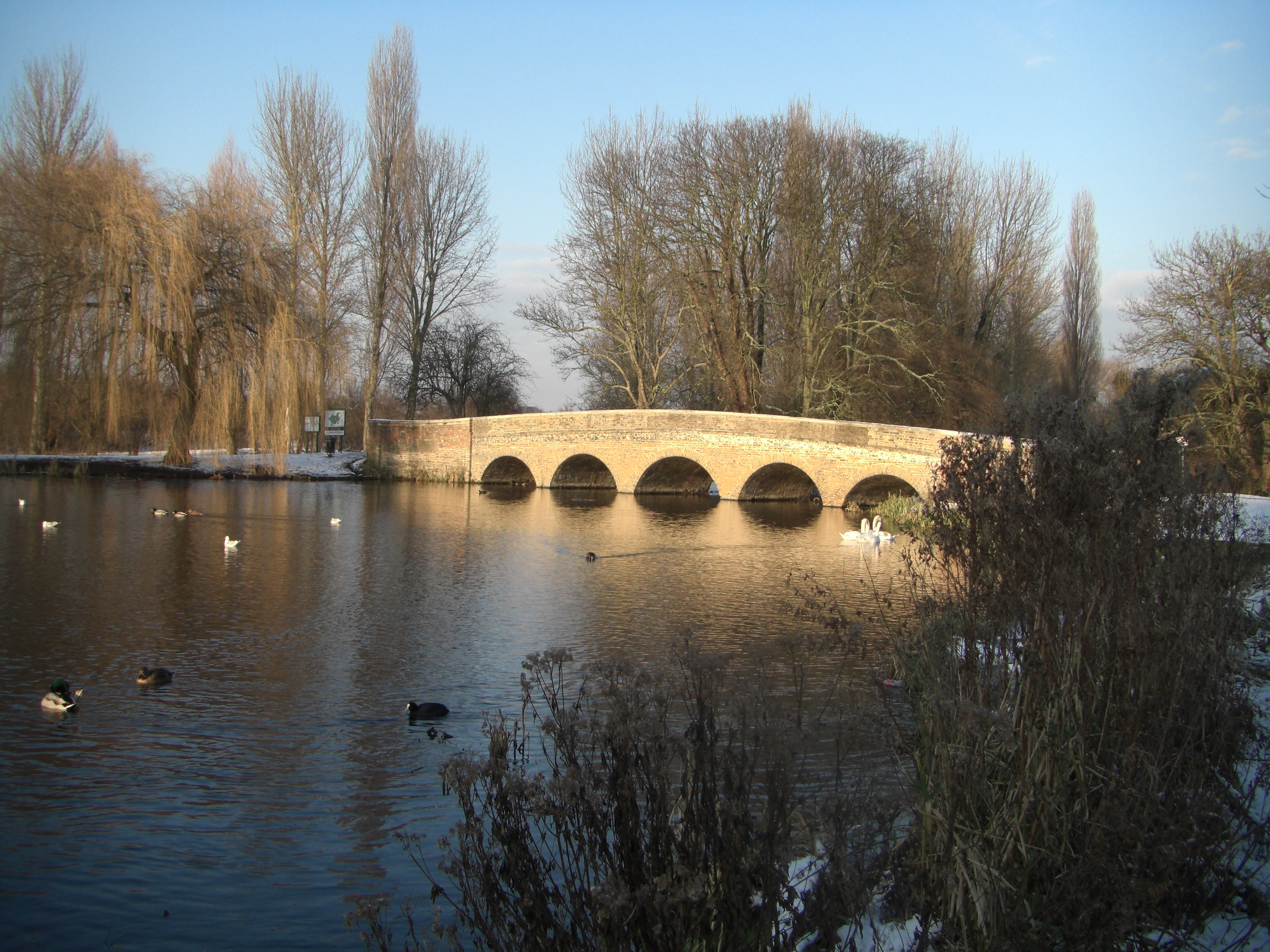
Five Arches Bridge in winter

Foots Cray Meadows is an area of parkland and woodland 100 hectares (240 acres) in size, and the largest open space in the borough. It borders the suburbs of Albany Park, Sidcup, Foots Cray, North Cray and Ruxley. The River Cray runs through it in a north-easterly direction. The London Loop, a public recreational walking path around London, also known as the "M25 for walkers", runs through the meadows parallel to the river from Sidcup Place, just south of the meadows. The meadows contain two bridges across the River Cray: Five Arches bridge and the smaller Penny Farthing Bridge.

The Meadows are a Local Nature Reserve, and a Site of Metropolitan Importance for Nature Conservation. They have also received a Green Flag Award.

=== Danson Park ===
Danson Park is situated between Welling and Bexleyheath. At 75 hectares, it is the second largest public park in the borough and the most used by the community. Opened in 1925, it is often considered the finest green open space in the borough, and is Grade II listed on the Register of Historic Parks and Gardens.

=== Hall Place ===
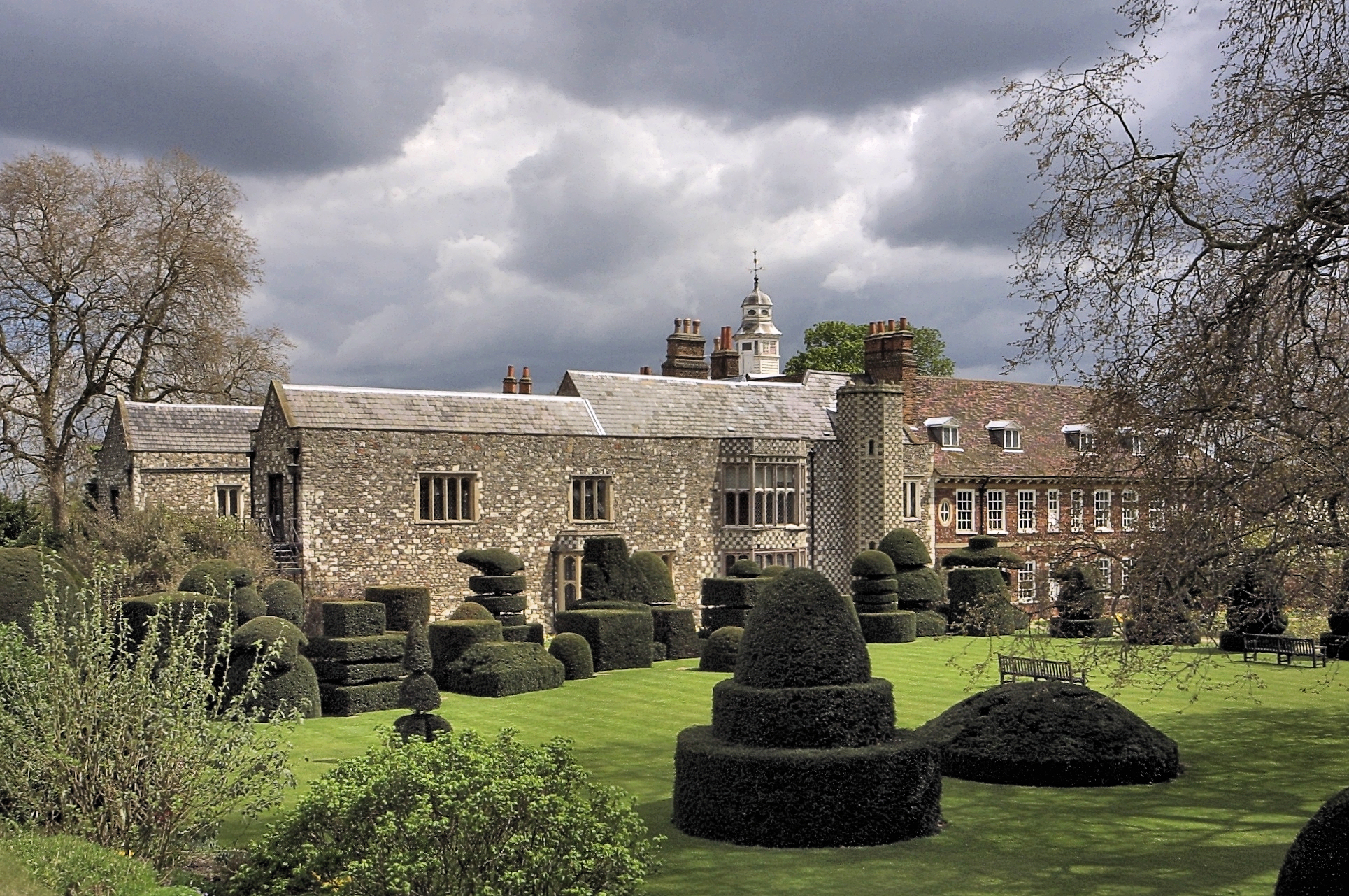
A view of Hall Place showing the topiary garden

The Hall Place estate is 65 hectares of landscaped gardens and grounds set around a 16th Century Grade I Listed stately home, including a topiary lawn, herb garden, tropical garden and long herbaceous cottage garden-styled borders. The gardens were first opened to the public in 1952 by Katharine, Duchess of Kent. Topiary replicas of the Queen's Beasts were planted in 1953 to mark the coronation of Elizabeth II.

Hall Place is a Grade I listed Historic Park, and has received a Green Flag Award for excellence in a public park or garden for 20 consecutive years from 1996 to 2016. The site is maintained by the Bexley Heritage Trust.

=== Lamorbey Park ===
Lamorbey Park is a 57-hectare (140-acre) park in Lamorbey, which was added to the Register of Historic Parks and Gardens of special historic interest in 1988. Originally the estate consisted of 119 hectares belonging to William Steele, a director of the East India Company, but over time sections of the estate have been separated for other uses, including two secondary schools (Chislehurst and Sidcup Grammar School and Hurstmere School), Rose Bruford College, and Sidcup Golf Club. The area of the park still in public ownership includes The Glade, a 7.4-hectare (18-acre) area of historic landscape laid in the 1920s with a large lake that houses the Lamorbey Angling Society.

=== Other large parks ===
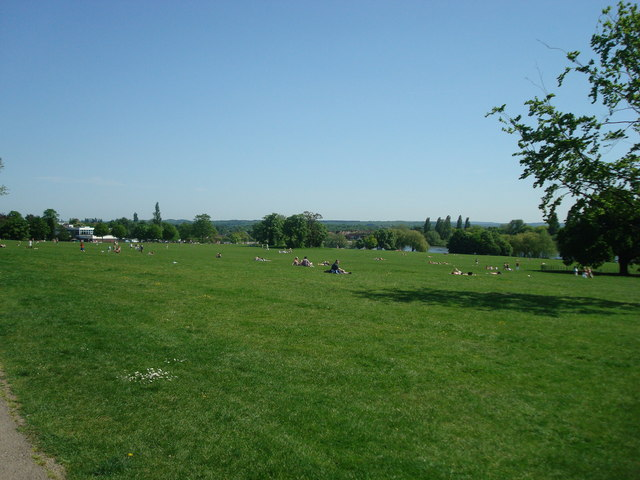
Danson Park

- East Wickham Open Space is a 28-hectare (69-acre) park in the north-west of the borough, situated between Welling and Plumstead. It was transferred from the Manor of Plumstead to the Borough of Bexley in 1902. The site was used as a landfill site during the late 1950s, before being converted for use as a park. The Green Chain Walk passes through the park, and it also contains a playground, and sports and skateboarding facilities. A river named the Wogebourne passes under the northern part of the park in an underground culvert, but previously flowed above ground through it.
- Erith Marshes
- Franks Park is a 17-hectare (42-acre) park in Belvedere, situated on the hill between the upper and lower parts of the town. It was formerly a part of the grounds of Belvedere Park, a property on Upper Park Road that was demolished in the mid-20th century. The area was purchased by Erith Council in 1920, and a park was established, named after Frank Beadle, a local man who donated funds towards the acquisition of the site. The park today has a wooded area with a substantial wildlife population, as well as a field and a playground.
- Sidcup Place is a 16.3-hectare (40-acre) open green space situated between Sidcup High Street and Queen Mary's Hospital. It extends from Frognal House to the east of the hospital, to The Green, an adjacent 0.12 hectares of parkland in front of the Manor House Registry Office, which contains Sidcup's War Memorial. It contains a playground and tennis courts.

== Woodland and scrubland ==
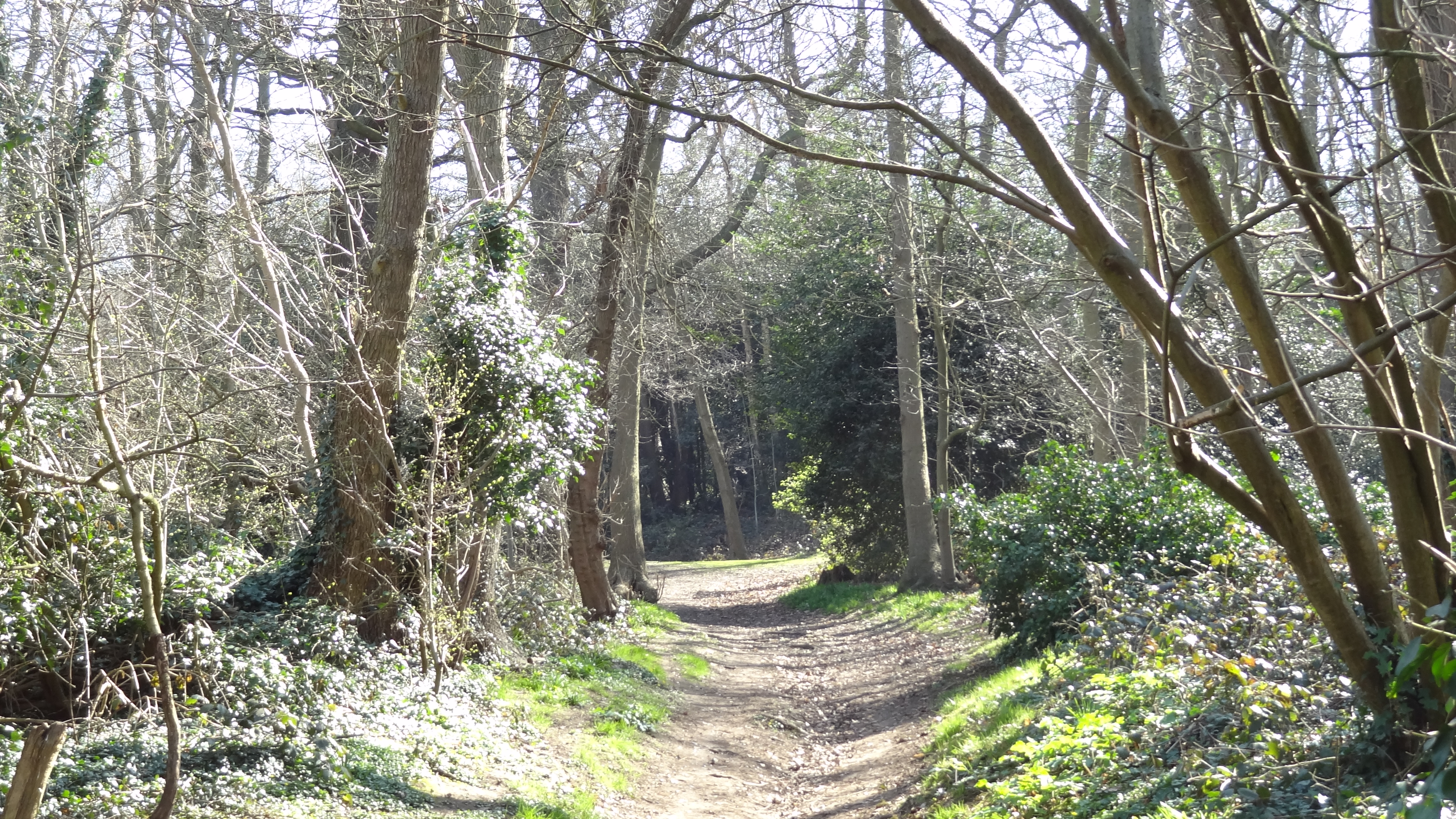
Lesnes Abbey Woods

=== Lesnes Abbey Woods ===
Lesnes Abbey Woods is an 88 hectare area of ancient woodland to the south-east of Abbey Wood, named after the Lesnes Abbey ruins that lie within its area. It is adjacent to Bostall Woods. The area is a Local Nature Reserve, and includes the Abbey Wood geological Site of Special Scientific Interest, an important site for early Tertiary fossils.

=== Other areas ===
- Barnehurst Open Space is an 11 hectare area of scrubland and woodland adjacent to Barnehurst Golf Course.
- Bexley Woods is a wooded area situated between Bexley and Blendon, to the south of Bridgen Road/Parkhill Road. The River Shuttle runs through these woods.
- Biggs Hill Wood is a 2.5-hectare (6.2-acre) area of woodland situated to the south of Watling Street between Crayford and Bexleyheath. This area houses oak, ash and sweet chestnut trees and is an important area for wildlife.
- Braeburn Park is a 22.3-hectare (55-acre) nature reserve in Crayford, managed by the London Wildlife Trust, which includes Wansunt Pit, a 1.9-hectare (4.7-acre) geological Site of Special Scientific Interest.
- Bursted Woods is an area of part-woodland, part-grassland in Barnehurst, situated to the west of Erith Road. The area was rural until the electrification of the nearby Bexleyheath railway line in 1926, after which sections of the woodland were used for housing. The remainder of the wood is a Grade II Site of Nature Conservation Interest, and the wood contains mature Pedunculate Oak, Sweet Chestnut coppice, ash, silver birch, field maple and other tree species.
- Chalk Wood is a 28-hectare ancient woodland situated to the east of North Cray Road in North Cray, in the south-east corner of the borough, contiguous with Joyden's Wood to its north-east. There is a bridle path for horse riding crossing the wood.
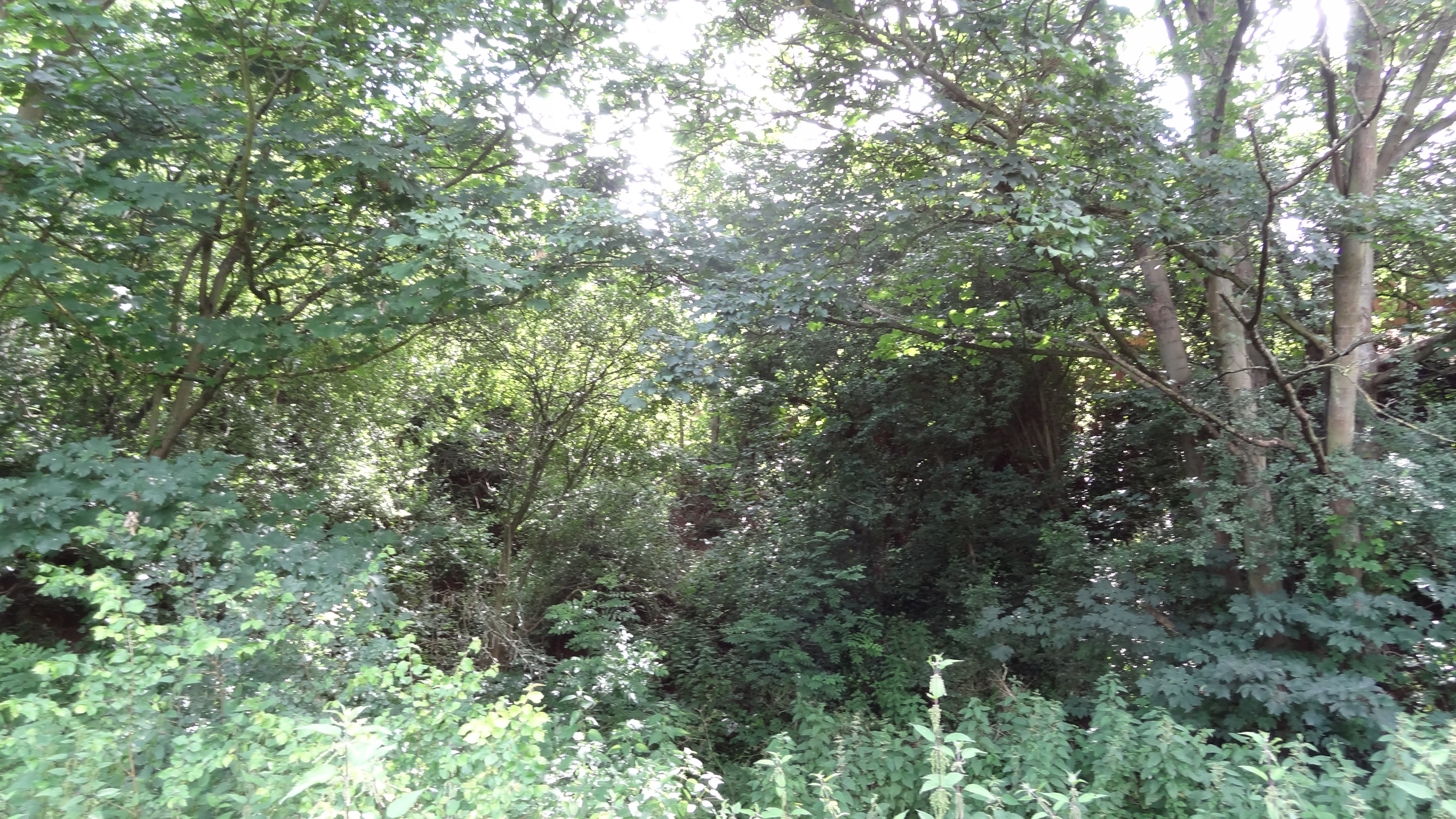
  Wansunt Pit, Braeburn Park
- Crayford Rough is a 4.2-hectare (10-acre) area of grassland between Hall Place and Crayford railway station. The area is home to many species of insects, butterflies and birds.

== Nature reserves ==
There are four designated Local Nature Reserves in Bexley, Crossness Nature Reserve, Danson Park Bog Garden, Foots Cray Meadows and Lesnes Abbey Woods.

== Small parks and recreation grounds ==
Other small parks in the borough include:

- Abbey Hill Park is a 2.8-hectare (6.9-acre) park in Sidcup, situated between Canterbury Avenue and the Dartford Loop railway line in Sidcup. Originally farmland, the park was established in the inter-war period when the area was developed for housing. It is named after a building nearby named Abbeyhill. The park was expanded in 2001 after absorbing an adjacent site previously used as allotments.
- Barnehurst Avenue Open Space is a 0.07-hectare (0.17-acre) area of grass on the junction of Barnehurst Avenue and Erith Road, Northumberland Heath, decorated with trees and flowers.
- Bedonwell Road Open Space is a 0.15-hectare (0.37-acre) area of grass in front of residential housing on Bedonwell Road, Belvedere.
- Beechwood Crescent Open Space is a 0.38-hectare (0.94-acre) grass park in Bexleyheath, situated between Beechwood Crescent and Chestnut Drive
- Belvedere Recreation Ground South is a grass park and sport and recreation area situated behind Belvedere High Street, south of Woolwich Road. The park contains tennis courts, and the second-largest playground in the borough.
- Belvedere Splashpark is a recreational park north of Woolwich Road in the centre of Belvedere. It was previously a water park, but Bexley Council decided on 22 February 2016 to close the water facilities, and convert the park into a regular playground.
- Berwick Crescent Open Space is a woodland route along the River Shuttle in Blackfen, parallel to Berwick Crescent, connecting Parish Wood Park and Holly Oak Park.
- Beverley Woods is a 1.24-hectare (3.1-acre) woodland surrounding Wyncham Stream, a tributary of the River Shuttle, situated between Blackfen and Lamorbey.
- Birch Walk is a wooded trail connecting Kempton Close and Fraser Road in Erith. The southern end of the trail opens into a small grass area with trees.
- Boevey Path Open Space is a 0.12-hectare (0.30-acre) open space situated next to Belvedere Sports Ground.
- Burnt Oak Lane Open Space is a 0.73-hectare (1.8-acre) green space adjacent to Burnt Oak Lane in Lamorbey.
- Byron Drive Open Space is a 0.4-hectare (0.99-acre) enclosed playground on Byron Drive, Northumberland Heath.
- Colyers Open Space is a small walled green area on Colyers Lane, Northumberland Heath, opposite Leigh Academy Bexley.
- Craydene Open Space is a large recreational space in Slade Green.
- Crayford Way Gardens are two small walled green spaces on Crayford Way, Crayford.
- The Crescent is a 0.31-hectare (0.77-acre) grassed area with trees south of Main Road in Sidcup.
- Danson Mead is a 0.44-hectare (1.1-acre) area of grass in front of houses next to Parkview Road, Welling.
- The Dell is a 0.79-hectare (2.0-acre) park on the north side of Crayford Way, Crayford, containing a playground and a street hockey pitch.
- Eastcote Gardens is a 0.39-hectare (0.96-acre) grassed area in Oxleas Close, Welling.
- Erith Recreation Ground is a large recreation area and sports facility next to Erith Leisure Centre to the west of the A206 between Erith and Slade Green. The site includes tennis courts and football pitches.
- Foots Cray Common is a 0.29-hectare (0.72-acre) green space next to Clarence Road, Sidcup, primarily used for dog-walking.
- Foots Cray Garden Open Space is a 0.12-hectare (0.30-acre) paved public area on Foots Cray High Street.
- Foots Cray Recreation Ground is a 3.4-hectare (8.4-acre) recreation ground situated to the west of Cray Road, south of Foots Cray. The ground contains several lime trees.
- The Green (Bexleyheath) is a 0.59-hectare (1.5-acre) green space situated in a residential area north of Bexleyheath Town Centre, close to Rydal Drive.
- The Green (Falconwood) is a 0.68-hectare (1.7-acre) green space in the central commercial area of Falconwood, with a playground and sports facilities.
- Groombridge Close Open Space is a 0.24 green space in Groombridge Close, Welling.
- Hales Field is a 1.18-hectare (2.9-acre) wildlife habitat around the River Cray in Foots Cray, adjacent to Edgington Way.
- Holly Hill Open Space is a 4.9-hectare (12-acre) area of grassland in Lessness Heath.
- Holly Oak Wood Park is a park on the north side of the River Shuttle, south of Blackfen.
- Holmscroft Open Space is a 1.6-hectare (4.0-acre) green space between Northumberland Heath and Slade Green, situated between Hurstwood Avenue and the A206.
- Howbury Lane Open Space is a grass recreation area on Howbury Lane in Slade Green. The space includes a playground and skateboarding facilities.
- Hurst Recreation Ground is a 1.6-hectare (4.0-acre) area of grass recreation space situated between Hurst Road and the River Shuttle in the area between Blendon and Albany Park.
- Jolly Farmers Open Space is a large green space situated between Crayford Way and the River Cray, next to the junction of Crayford Way and the A206. The park takes its name from the nearby Jolly Farmers public house, which closed in 2014.
- King George's Playing Fields, also known as Town Park, is a 0.82-hectare (2.0-acre) recreation area situated to the north of Bexleyheath Broadway. The site contains a garden, sports facilities with floodlighting, and a skate park.
- King George's Recreation Ground is a sports and recreation area between Longlands and Lamborbey, situated between Longlands Road and the south side of the Dartford Loop railway line. The area also contains a playground.
- Lawrence Road Open Space is a 0.17-hectare (0.42-acre) fenced children's play area in Lawrence Road, to the west of Northumberland Heath.
- Lodge Hill Playground is a 0.58-hectare (1.4-acre) open space with an area of grass and a large playground, situated at the bottom of Lodge Hill, on the road between Welling and Plumstead. It is opposite the east entrance of East Wickham Open Space.
- Long Lane Open Space is a 0.61-hectare (1.5-acre) green space situated to the south of Long Lane in West Heath.
- Longlands Recreation Ground is a 2.5-hectare (6.2-acre) recreation ground with a football pitch, in the centre of the Longlands residential area.
- Manor House Open Space is a 0.51-hectare (1.3-acre) open space adjacent to Manor House, a former stately home. The space contains a bowling green and croquet lawn.
- Marlborough Park is a park in the north of Lamorbey, divided by the River Shuttle and Burnt Oak Lane, adjacent to Sidcup Golf Club.
- Martens Grove is an area of parkland and mature woodland adjacent to Martens Avenue, between Bexleyheath, Barnehurst and Crayford. The park contains a playground and cycling facilities.
- Mayplace Recreation Ground is a 4.9-hectare (12-acre) recreation ground adjoining Barnehurst Golf Course to the north. The space is administered by Danson Sports FC, and contains football and astroturf hockey pitches.
- Millfield Open Space is a small green space on Iron Mill Lane, Crayford.
- Northumberland Heath Recreation Ground is a 9.4-hectare (23-acre) recreation ground in Northumberland Heath, with a playground, hard tennis courts, and several rugby and football pitches. The park was established in 1901 when the area was developed for housing. The park previously contained a bandstand, but this was removed in the 1960s. The park is home to Erith Rugby Club.
- Ocean Park is a 0.3-hectare (0.74-acre) green space situated between Erith town centre and the River Thames.
- Old Farm Park is a 3.6-hectare (8.9-acre) park situated between Old Farm Road and the north side of the Dartford Loop railway line in Lamorbey, to the west of Sidcup station.
- Old Manor Way is a 0.22-hectare (0.54-acre) green space with a small playground, on the junction of several residential roads to the east of Barnehurst station.
- The Oval is a 0.82-hectare (2.0-acre) green open space in front of The Oval shopping parade, the central commercial area of the Marlborough Park Estate between Blackfen and Sidcup, built in 1933 by New Ideal Homesteads. The Oval has a variety of flora, including flowers, shrubs and trees.
- Palmar Gardens is a 0.52-hectare (1.3-acre) wooded park situated in residential backstreets, on the south side of the Bexleyheath Line railway, to the east of Bexleyheath station.
- Parish Wood Park is situated on the borough's boundary with the Royal Borough of Greenwich in Blackfen. The park is what is left of the fen that once covered the whole area from which Blackfen takes its name. In 2009, Parish Wood was one of 11 parks in Greater London chosen by public vote to receive money for redevelopment. The park received £400,000 towards better footpaths, more lighting, refurbished public toilets and new play areas for children.
- Parkhurst Gardens is a 0.2-hectare (0.49-acre) green space just to the north of Parkhill Road, Bexley.
- Penhill Park is a 7.8-hectare (19-acre) park slightly to the south of the A210 between Blackfen and Blendon. The park is fully enclosed by housing from the Penhill Park Estate, built in the 1930s. The park had previously been part of Blendon Wood. The park contains a large playground and allotments in the north-west corner.
- Riverside Gardens is a 1.16-hectare (2.9-acre) park in Erith town centre, between the high street and the River Thames. The park contains trees, flowerbeds, and a raised viewing platform for observation of the Thames Estuary.
- Riverside Walk is a trail that follows the River Shuttle from Penhill Road in the west to Parkhill Road in the east, running through residential backstreets in Blendon and then traversing Bexley Woods. The walk has three separate sections: the west section, a 7.8-hectare (19-acre) riverbank grassland area running from Penhill Road to Albany Road; a central section opening out into a 6.8-hectare (17-acre) park with a playground and sports facilities; and an east section consisting of a path following the river through Bexley Woods.
- Russell Park is a 6.8-hectare (17-acre) park on Long Lane, just off the A220 between Barnehurst and Bexleyheath. The park contains a large playground, several tennis courts, a bowling green, and a small arboretum.
- Rutland Shaw is a 2-hectare (4.9-acre) grass area with trees on the north side of the Dartford Loop railway line, just to the west of Albany Park station.
- Shenstone Park is a sloping grass and woods area on the north side of the A207 between Bexleyheath and Crayford.
- Shoulder of Mutton Green is a 1.49-hectare (3.7-acre) public open space in Welling, situated between Wickham Street and Bellegrove Road. It owes its unusual name to its triangular shape. Before the urban growth of the nearby hamlet of Welling in the early 20th century, Shoulder of Mutton Green was surrounded by fields.
- Slade Green Recreation Ground is a recreation ground in the residential backstreets of Slade Green, at the west fringe of Dartford & Crayford Marshes. The site contains two playgrounds and sports facilities.
- St. Mary's Recreation Ground is a 4.1-hectare (10-acre) area of grass including a football pitch and rugby pitch, located on the south side of the A2 immediately to the east of the Black Prince interchange. It is the home ground of Dartfordians Rugby Club.
- St. Paulinus Gardens is a small garden situated in front of St. Paulinus Church, Crayford.
- Steeple Memorial Garden is a 0.46-hectare (1.1-acre) green space in front of a bowling alley on the south side of the A207 to the west of Bexleyheath town centre. The garden contains the town's war memorial.
- Stevens Park is a 3.9-hectare (9.6-acre) park with a large playground in residential backstreets between Welling and West Heath.
- Stoneham Park is a large grassed area situated between the A207 and A2000 to the north of Crayford.
- Streamway and Chapmans Land Open Space are two connected park areas running alongside Bedens Stream in Belvedere to Brook Street in the east.
- Waring Park is a 5.3-hectare (13-acre) grass area situated in residential backstreets to the south-east of Lamorbey, containing tennis courts and other sports facilities.
- The Warren is a 4.6-hectare (11-acre) area of grass and woodland situated in residential backstreets on the hill between Bexleyheath town centre and the A2.
- Waterside Gardens is a park overlooking the River Cray in Crayford town centre. The park was renovated in 2009 by a community project, incorporating art installations and a design themed on the town's industrial history.
- West Heath Recreation Ground is a 1.84-hectare (4.5-acre) park in West Heath, containing a large playground and tennis and basketball courts.
- West Street Small Park is a 0.29-hectare (0.72-acre) park with grass and shrubs adjoining West Street in Erith town centre.
- Whitehall Lane Open Space is a large grass area in the centre of Slade Green, immediately to the west of Slade Green station. It is often used for fun fairs and other community events.
- Wilde Road Open Space is a small grass open space in residential backstreets to the west of Northumberland Heath.
- Willersley Park is a 2.3-hectare (5.7-acre) park between Blackfen and Lamorbey, situated on the north bank of the River Shuttle between Holly Oak Wood Park and Marlborough Park. The park contains a playground, tennis courts and other sports facilities, and a café.
- Wyncham Stream is a tributary of the River Shuttle, which runs parallel to Longmeadow Road and Brookend Road between Lamorbey and New Eltham, with grass areas on both banks.
