= Blendon =

Blendon can refer to:

- Blendon, London
- Blendon Township, Michigan
- Blendon Township, Ohio
