= Wogebourne =

Wogebourne Woghbourne, Plumstead River, Wickham Valley Watercourse Crossway Canal
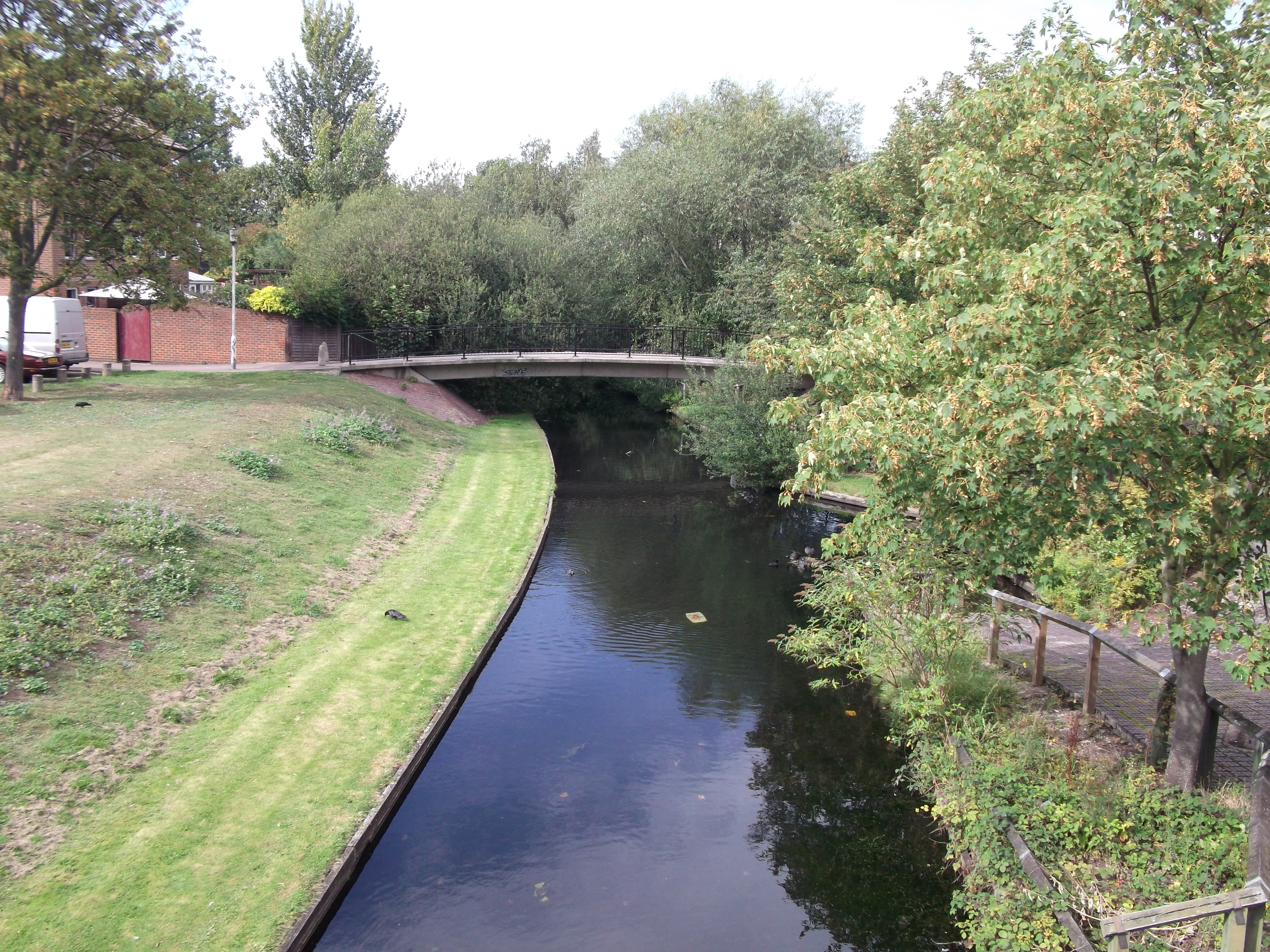
- Crossway Canal in Thamesmead, the lower reach of the Wogebourne

Location
- Country: England
- County: Greater London
- London Boroughs: Greenwich; Bexley,
- Places: Shooter's Hill, Falconwood, Welling, East Wickham, Plumstead, Abbey Wood, Thamesmead, Crossness
- Open areas: Oxleas Wood, East Wickham Open Space, Winn's Common, Bostall Heath and Woods, Erith Marshes

Physical characteristics
- Source
  - location: Oxleas Wood, Shooter's Hill, Royal Borough of Greenwich
  - coordinates: 51°27′59″N 00°04′23″E
  - elevation: 97 m (318 ft)
- Mouth
  - location: Southmere Lake, Thamesmead, London Borough of Bexley or River Thames, Crossness, Bexley
  - coordinates: 51°30′45″N 00°07′27″E
  - elevation: 0 m (0 ft)
- Length: 8 km (5.0 mi)

Basin features
- River system: River Thames

The Wogebourne (/woʊɡˈbɔːrn/) is an 8 km (5.0 mi) tributary of the River Thames in the southeast London boroughs of Greenwich and Bexley, that flows generally in a northeasterly direction, from its source in Oxleas Wood in Shooter's Hill, to Thamesmead where it joins the Thames.

The Wogebourne has appeared in records since at least the fourteenth century, and has been known by other names including Woghbourne, Plumstead River, and Wickham Valley Watercourse. The upper reaches of the watercourse in Shooter's Hill, Falconwood, Welling, and East Wickham are above ground through woodland, farmland and fields, where several smaller tributaries join; whereas the lower reaches in Plumstead, Abbey Wood, and Thamesmead are mostly underground within culverts beneath residential areas. The final part of the river in Thamesmead was previously marshland which was drained in the nineteenth and twentieth centuries, where the Wogebourne now completes its course through a man-made lake called Southmere and a purpose-built channel named Crossway Canal which empties into the Thames at Crossness.

In its upper reaches, part of the Wogebourne marks some of the boundary between the London boroughs of Greenwich and Bexley, and in the past the County of London's border with Kent.

== Name ==
The watercourse is usually called the Wogebourne, or sometimes River Wogebourne. This name has been in use since at least the fourteenth century, when the alternative spelling Woghbourne, was also in use in addition to the present day spelling. Another name that has been used to refer to the watercourse since at least the sixteenth century is Plumstead River. More recently the river has been called Wickham Valley Watercourse, or Wickham Valley Waterway.

In the twentieth century the end of the watercourse around Thamesmead and the wetlands of Plumstead and Erith Marshes was diverted into purpose built channels for the water to flow into the River Thames, these have individual names including Crossway Canal, Harrow Canal, Waterfield Canal, and Butts Canal.

== Course ==
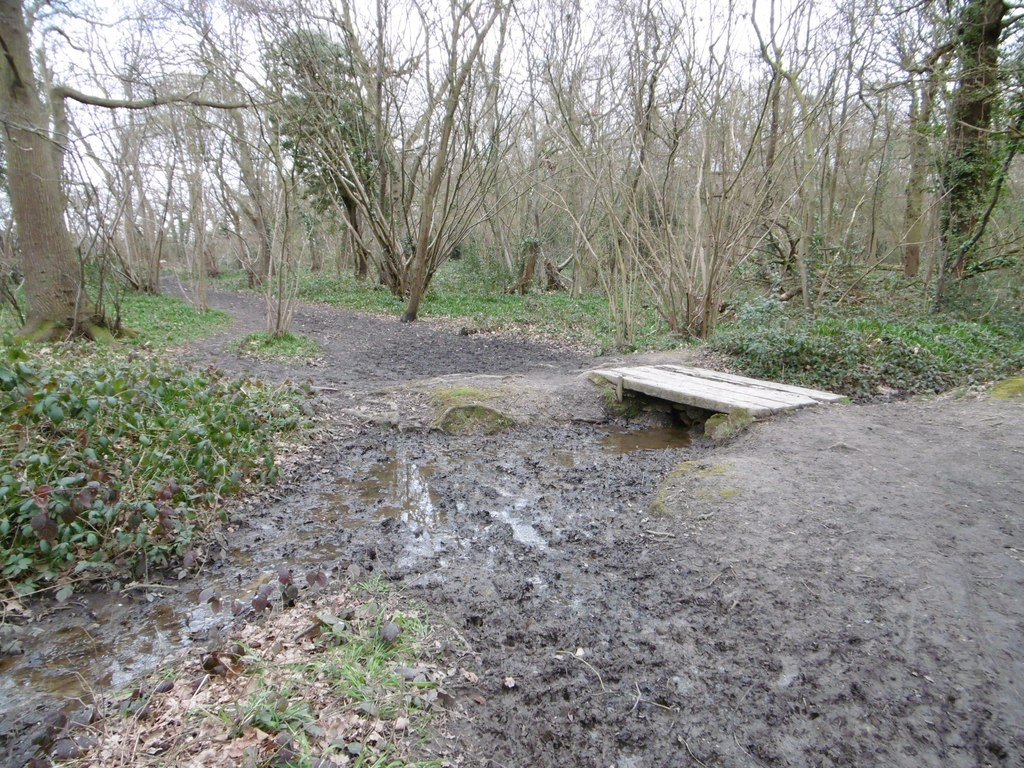
Tiny footbridge over the Wogebourne near its source in Oxleas Wood, where the river is only a small stream.

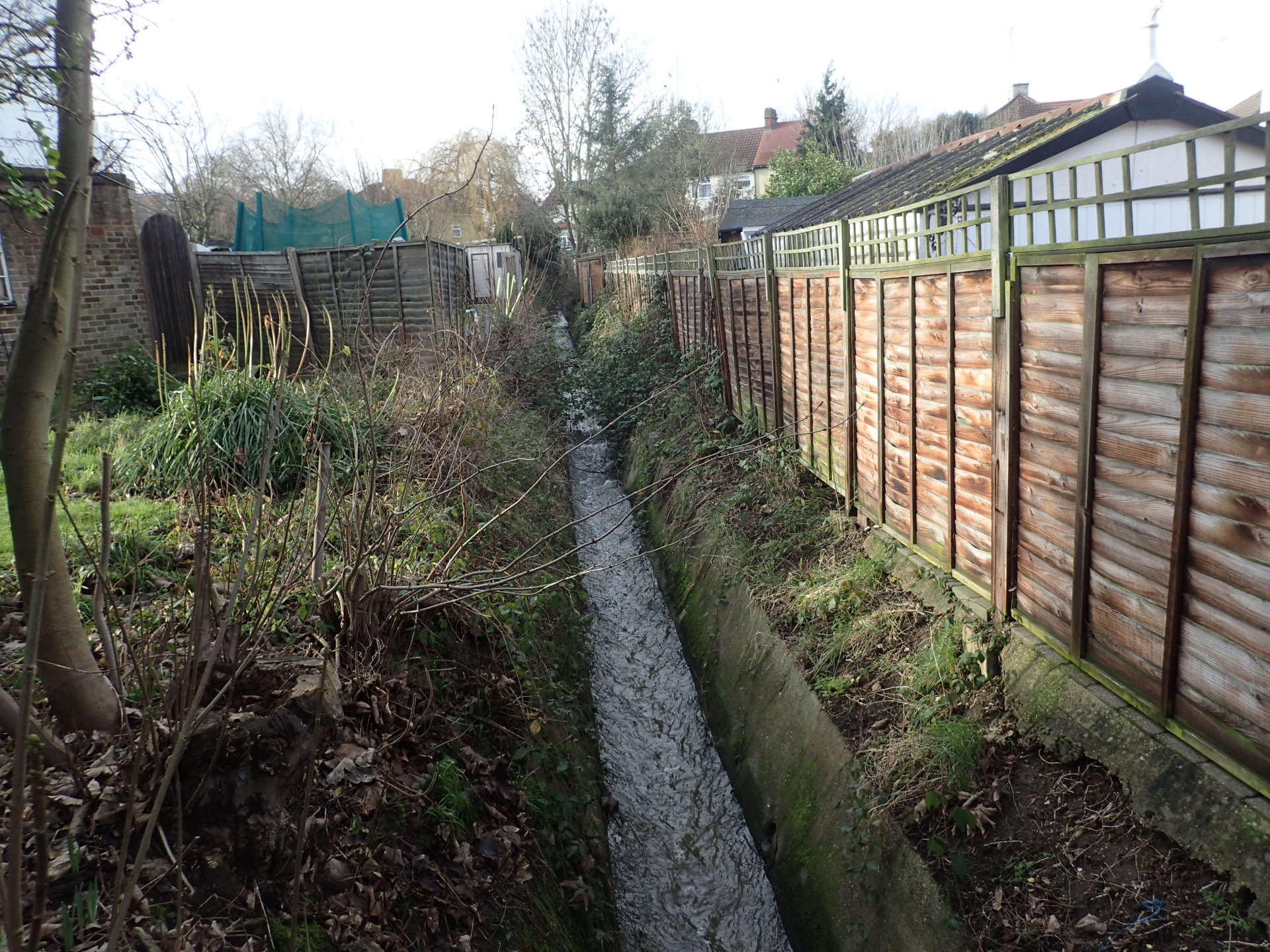
The Wogebourne in an open concrete channel, flowing behind back gardens of Wickham Lane and Woodbrook Road, between East Wickham, and Plumstead.

The Wogebourne rises within Oxleas Woods southeast of Shooter's Hill in the Royal Borough of Greenwich from several sources. The main source has an elevation of around 97 m (318 ft) above sea level, where it flows for about 1 km (0.62 mi) and dropping 30 m (98 ft) in a curved path through the woodland, and under several small footbridges, first southeast toward Falconwood, then east followed by north toward the A207 road, Shooter's Hill and part of Watling Street. The river flows northward, within a culvert, under this main road, just to the west side of the We Anchor In Hope pub, and BP petrol station in Welling. From here its course goes northeast for just over 1 km (0.62 mi) mostly lined with trees and shrubs through the fields of Woodlands Farm. This section of the stream marks the boundary between the London Boroughs of Greenwich to the west and Bexley to the east.

Here the stream is joined from the east by a tiny spring tributary near the Anchor in Hope pub and a slightly longer tributary from the west joining from near the Woodlands Farm buildings and the grounds of Shooter's Hill Golf Course. At the northern end of the fields the stream passes south of Willow Dene School and Swingate Lane Playing Fields before entering a culvert at the elevation of 40 m (130 ft) and flowing east under the residential roads Edison Grove and Glenmore Road in East Wickham. The stream flows underground northeastward in a straight culvert for 1 km (0.62 mi), underneath East Wickham Open Space just to the south of Woolwich Cemetery then under another small residential road Bournewood Road, then emerges above ground again at the elevation of 25 m (82 ft) between two houses on the east side of Wickham Lane, part of the A209 road. From here the stream continues flowing northeasterly between houses and gardens, in an open concrete channel, except when it passes under the residential road Woodbrook Road for another 300 m (980 ft) when it takes a sharp left turn just by the northwest corner of Plumstead Cemetery. From here the river travels northwest for another 300 m (980 ft) in an open channel between the back gardens of Woodbrook Road to the southwest and Bostall Woods to the northeast, from where another short tributary joins, passing beneath a cul-de-sac named Streamdale then returning to another underground culvert. From here the river gently curves northward toward Plumstead and is joined by a small stream coming from Winn's Common to the west, and passes under several residential roads including Waterdale Road, Oakmere Road, Rutherglen Road, Bastion Road, Glendale Road, Gatling Road then under Bostall Hill part of the A206 road after almost 1 km (0.62 mi) at the elevation of 11 m (36 ft). After this the Wogebourne continues flowing underground for another 800 m (2,600 ft) beneath the residential roads Myrtledene Road, Manton Road, Blithdale Road and Bracondale Road before passing underneath the North Kent Line. The Wogebourne then takes a sharp right turn and flows east for 1.2 km (0.75 mi) between the railway line and Mottisfont Road towards Abbey Wood near the station then turns northward for another 600 m (2,000 ft) behind Boxgrove Primary School.

Here the stream flows east parallel with Eynsham Drive for 200 m (660 ft) beneath the car parks of a Lidl store and a vet surgery, then travels northeast for another 400 m (1,300 ft) under Harrow Manorway part of the A2041 road and more residential buildings before emptying into a lake called Southmere in Thamesmead, at an elevation of just 1 m (3 ft 3 in). Southmere is a man-made lake 8.5 ha (21 acres) in area and around 400 m (1,300 ft) across, from here the watercourse continues northward in a wider man-made open channel named Crossway Canal, for around 1.5 km (0.93 mi), through Crossway Park, under the local main road Crossway several small footbridges, and the Ridgeway and Green Chain Walk paths then through a nature reserve Crossway Lake, before emptying into the River Thames. There is another series of canals to the west which connect with Crossway Canal, named Harrow Canal, Waterfield Canal and Butts Canal linking several slightly smaller man-made lakes including Birchmere, and Thamesmere.

== History ==
The Wogebourne has been documented since at least the fourteenth century, and was originally a tidal river in part. In the early twentieth century and earlier, the section of the river that runs through what is now East Wickham Open Space flowed in a meandering path above ground through the areas of woodland, Bourne Spring Wood, previously called Bowan Spring Wood and Hill Grove, and was joined from the south by a short tributary that flowed through a pond, both which no longer exist. When the County of London existed from 1889 to 1965 the Wogebourne formed part of its boundary with the county of Kent near Welling and East Wickham. In the twentieth century the Wogebourne within East Wickham Open Space was diverted underground into a straight culvert.

In 2015 Crossrail were constructing new railway between Abbey Wood and Plumstead stations, for the new Elizabeth line to meet the existing North Kent Line. During excavation the underground section of the River Wogebourne was uncovered causing minor flooding and the water was temporarily diverted whilst construction continued. 270 m (890 ft) of underground culvert near Abbey Wood railway station was destroyed, and a by-pass culvert was created for the watercourse further from the live rails. Initially the contractors thought the river diversion may cost up to £20 million, but managed to complete the work at a lower price. In the twenty first century the local government have had concerns about the possibility of the river flooding, especially in its lower reaches.

Next confluence upstream	River Thames	Next confluence downstream
River Roding (north)	Wogebourne	River Rom (north)
