= Blendon, London =

Coordinates: 51.447053°N 0.123575°E

Blendon
- Location within Greater London
- Population: 10,910 (2011 Census. Blendon and Penhill Ward)
- OS grid reference: TQ478742
- London borough: Bexley
- Ceremonial county: Greater London
- Region: London
- Country: England
- Sovereign state: United Kingdom
- Post town: BEXLEY
- Postcode district: DA5
- Post town: SIDCUP
- Postcode district: DA15
- Dialling code: 020
- Police: Metropolitan
- Fire: London
- Ambulance: London
- London Assembly: Bexley and Bromley

Blendon is an area of South East London within the London Borough of Bexley, located between Bexleyheath and Sidcup.

== History ==
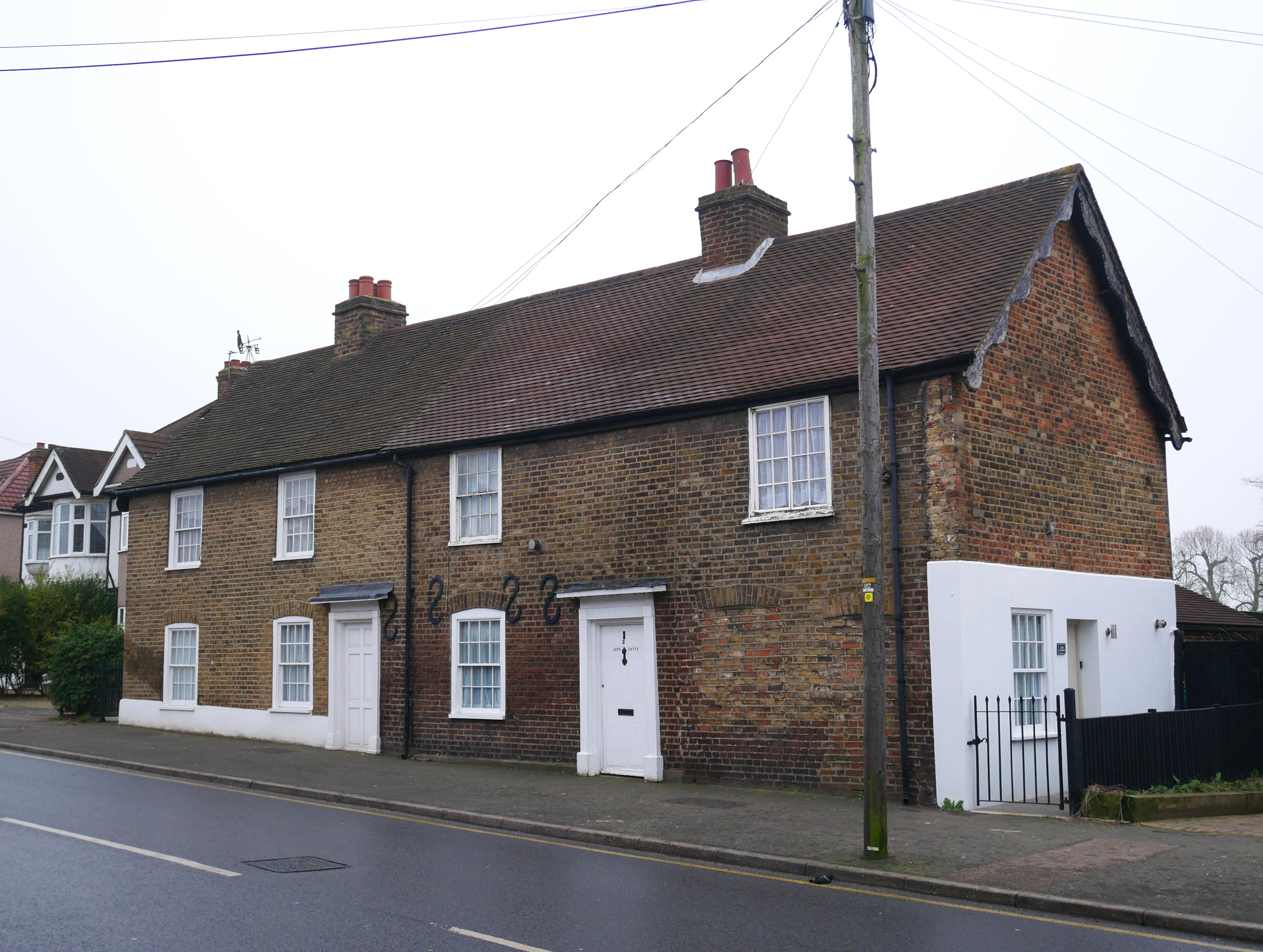
The Grade II-listed Jays Cottages in Blendon

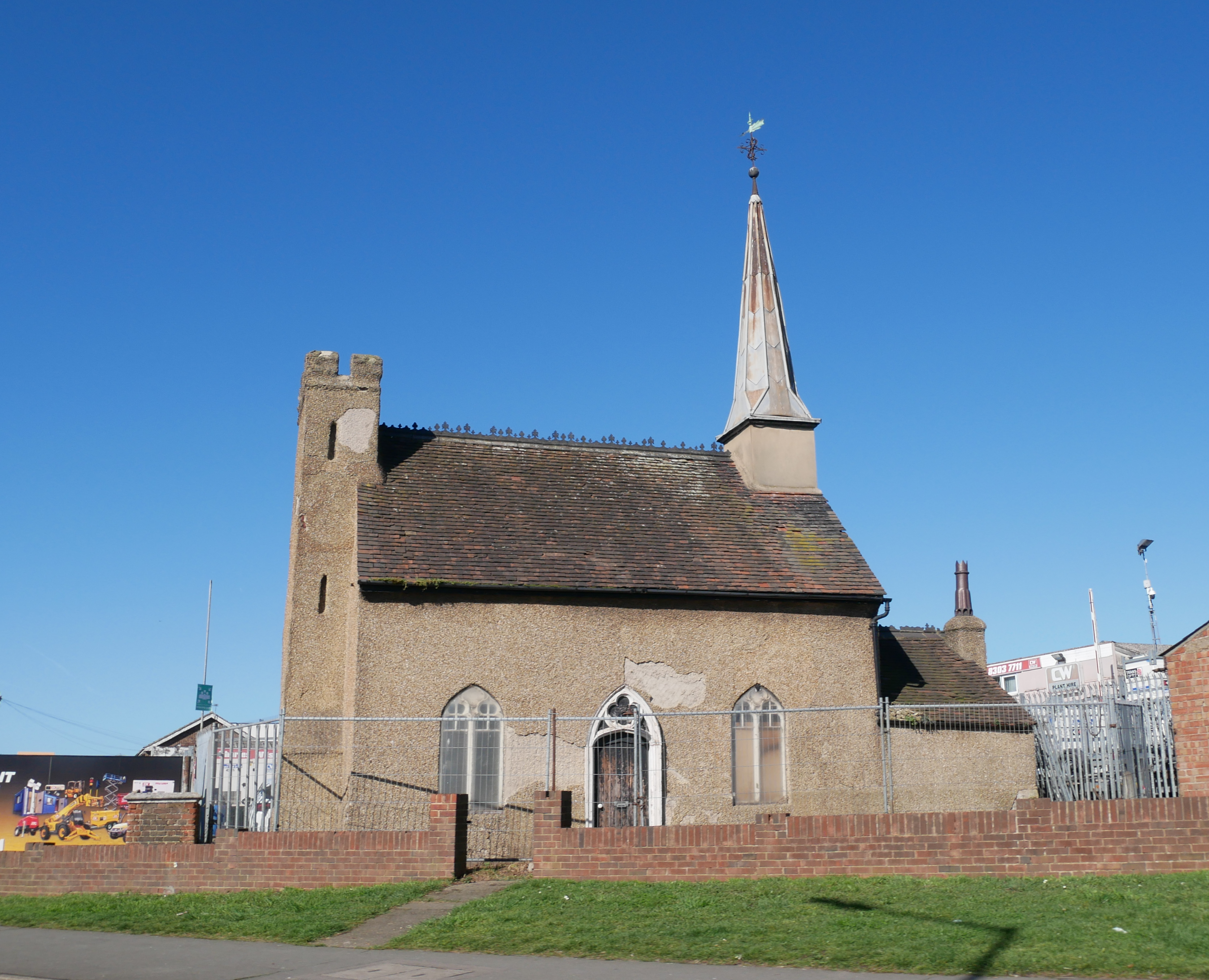
The 18th-century Chapel House in Blendon, a Grade II listed structure

It is probably named after the Bladindon family who owned land in the area. Blendon Hall was built in 1763, was sold to a local housing developer in 1929 and eventually demolished to make way for suburban housing. Today the area is a middle-class residential district with a small row of shops along the western stretch of Blendon Road.

== Transport ==
=== Rail ===
The closest National Rail station to Blendon is Albany Park.

=== Buses ===
Albany Park is served by four Transport for London bus services.

- 132 to North Greenwich via Eltham and to Bexleyheath (Weekend 24 Hour Service)
- B13 to New Eltham and to Bexleyheath
- B14 to Orpington via Sidcup and to Bexleyheath
- N21 to Trafalgar Square via Eltham, Lewisham and New Cross and to Bexleyheath (Night Service)

== Nearby areas ==
Blendon borders Bexleyheath to the north and north east, Bexley to the east, Albany Park to the south east, south and south west, Blackfen to the west and Welling to the north west.
