= Blackfen =

Coordinates: 51.45080°N 0.09255°E

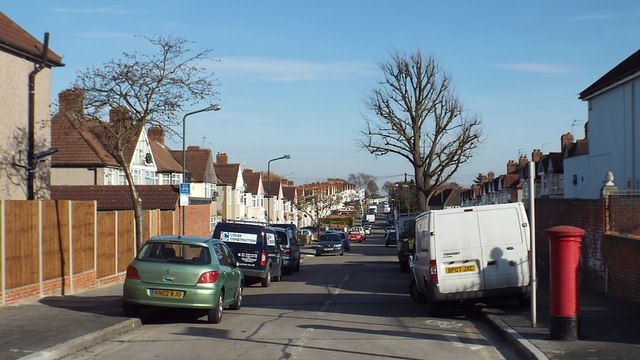
- Lyndon Avenue, Blackfen

- Location within Greater London
- Population: 10,616 (2011 Census. Blackfen and Lamorbey Ward)
- OS grid reference: TQ455745
- London borough: Bexley
- Ceremonial county: Greater London
- Region: London
- Country: England
- Sovereign state: United Kingdom
- Post town: SIDCUP
- Postcode district: DA15
- Dialling code: 020
- Police: Metropolitan
- Fire: London
- Ambulance: London
- UK Parliament: Old Bexley & Sidcup
- London Assembly: Bexley and Bromley

Blackfen is an area of South East London, England, within the London Borough of Bexley. It is located north of Sidcup and south of Welling. Prior to the creation of Greater London in 1965 it was in the historic county of Kent.

"Blackfen" means a black, marshy area. The soil is dark and fertile and the area around Blackfen Road and Wellington Avenue is prone to flooding in extreme conditions. The housing stock is almost exclusively owner-occupied houses of conventional British design. The sale of the Danson Estate in 1922 marked the beginning of a major period of house building in the area and most of the houses date from the 1930s.

At the junction of Blackfen Road and Westwood Lane, is the George Staples (formerly known as The Woodman). The original Woodman pub dates from 1845; the present building was completed in 1931.

== Local services ==
=== Churches ===
The Catholic Church of Our Lady of the Rosary near the top end of Burnt Oak Lane was built in 1936. Originally part of the parish of St Stephen's, Welling, it became a parish Church in its own right in 1945.

The Anglican Church of the Holy Redeemer in Days Lane, dedicated on 21 October 1933, is built entirely of steel and concrete. The architect was A.S.R. Ley. The Church describes itself as a "forward-looking, average Anglican congregation". The Good Shepherd Church on Blackfen Road is part of the parish of Holy Redeemer.

=== Library ===
The Blackfen Library moved from Cedar Avenue to newly refurbished premises on Blackfen Road in March 2005. There was some local controversy because of the character of the old library building and uncertainty as to whether the premises would be put to any use. In April 2016 Bexley Council handed over control of Blackfen Library to the New Generation Church Trust, and Blackfen Library became Blackfen Community Library.

=== Shopping ===
There are two principal shopping parades, on Blackfen Road and at The Oval.

At the Oval, there are three restaurants and a number of other small shops and businesses. The crescent-shaped parade of shops includes flats above and fronts an oval-shaped unfenced public garden with paths, flower beds and ornamental trees. Both the parade, with Tudoresque details to the frontage, and this small municipal garden are included in a designated Conservation Area. Underneath the public garden is a large World War II air-raid shelter.

The larger shopping centre of Blackfen lacks greenery or architectural finesse, but includes a large foodstore (Co-op) with free parking space next to a prominent flyover that carries the modern A2 Trunk Road. The Blackfen Road shops include a post office, several car sales showrooms and many small local businesses including cafés and fast food outlets, jewellers, clothing shops, hairdressers, building suppliers, cycle store and an independent funeral director. It benefits from direct bus links to larger shopping centres at Bexleyheath, Eltham, Sidcup, Welling and Woolwich.

=== Greenery ===
The River Shuttle flows eastward through Blackfen; along the river in this area are four parks/open spaces. In the order they appear on the course of the river, they are: Parish Wood, Holly Oak Wood Park, Willersley Park, and Marlborough Park. Wyncham Stream flowing north joins the River Shuttle at Holly Oak Wood Park; there is a small wood on this stream called Beverley Wood.

== Education ==
Blackfen School for Girls is at the eastern end of Blackfen Road. Our Lady of the Rosary Catholic Primary School is in Holbeach Gardens. Days Lane Primary School is the largest primary school in the borough of Bexley and has approximately 650 children on its role. Sherwood Park Primary School is located off Sherwood Park Avenue and Ramillies Road.

The University of Greenwich Avery Hill Campus is located less than 1 mile to the West of the area.

== Transport ==
Blackfen is served by London Buses routes 51 to Woolwich via Welling and Orpington via Sidcup, 132 to North Greenwich via Eltham and to Bexleyheath, and B13 to New Eltham and Bexleyheath. The nearest National Rail stations are Sidcup and Welling.

== Politics and government ==
Blackfen is part of the Old Bexley and Sidcup constituency for elections to the House of Commons of the United Kingdom, currently represented by Louie French from the Conservative Party.

Blackfen is part of the Blackfen and Lamorbey ward for elections to London Borough of Bexley.

== Nearby areas ==
Blackfen borders Welling to the north west, north and north east, Blendon to the east and south east, Sidcup to the south and Avery Hill to the south west and west.
