= Longlands =

Coordinates: 51.4302°N 0.0854°E

- Location within Greater London
- Population: 10,442 (2011 Census. Ward)
- OS grid reference: TQ449722
- London borough: Bexley; Bromley; Greenwich
- Ceremonial county: Greater London
- Region: London
- Country: England
- Sovereign state: United Kingdom
- Post town: SIDCUP
- Postcode district: DA14, DA15
- Post town: LONDON
- Postcode district: SE9
- Dialling code: 020
- Police: Metropolitan
- Fire: London
- Ambulance: London
- UK Parliament: Old Bexley and Sidcup; Eltham and Chislehurst
- London Assembly: Bexley and Bromley; Bexley and Bromley; Greenwich and Lewisham

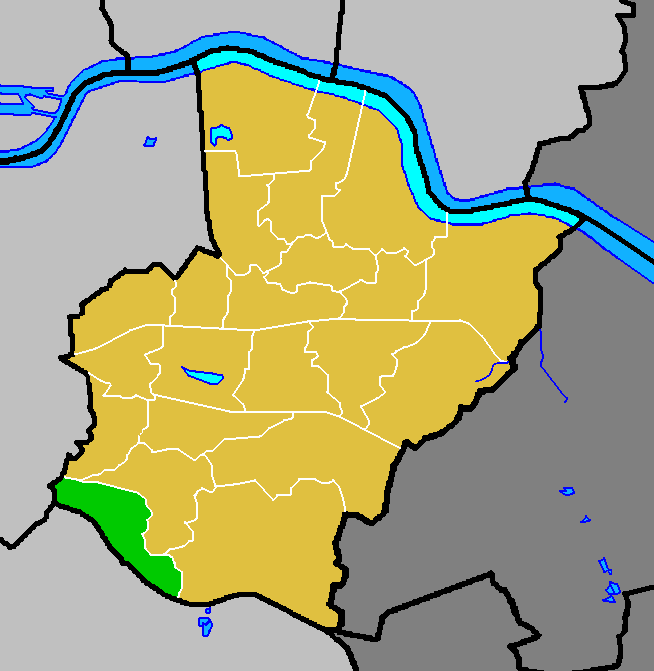
Longlands ward (green) within the London Borough of Bexley (yellow)

Longlands is an area of South East London that straddles the boundaries of the London boroughs of Bexley, Bromley and Greenwich. It lies north west of Sidcup and south east of Eltham.

Some old maps and records have the name as two words "Long Lands", and show it was in the Foots Cray/Sidcup parish in the Hundred of Ruxley.

== Found within Longlands ==
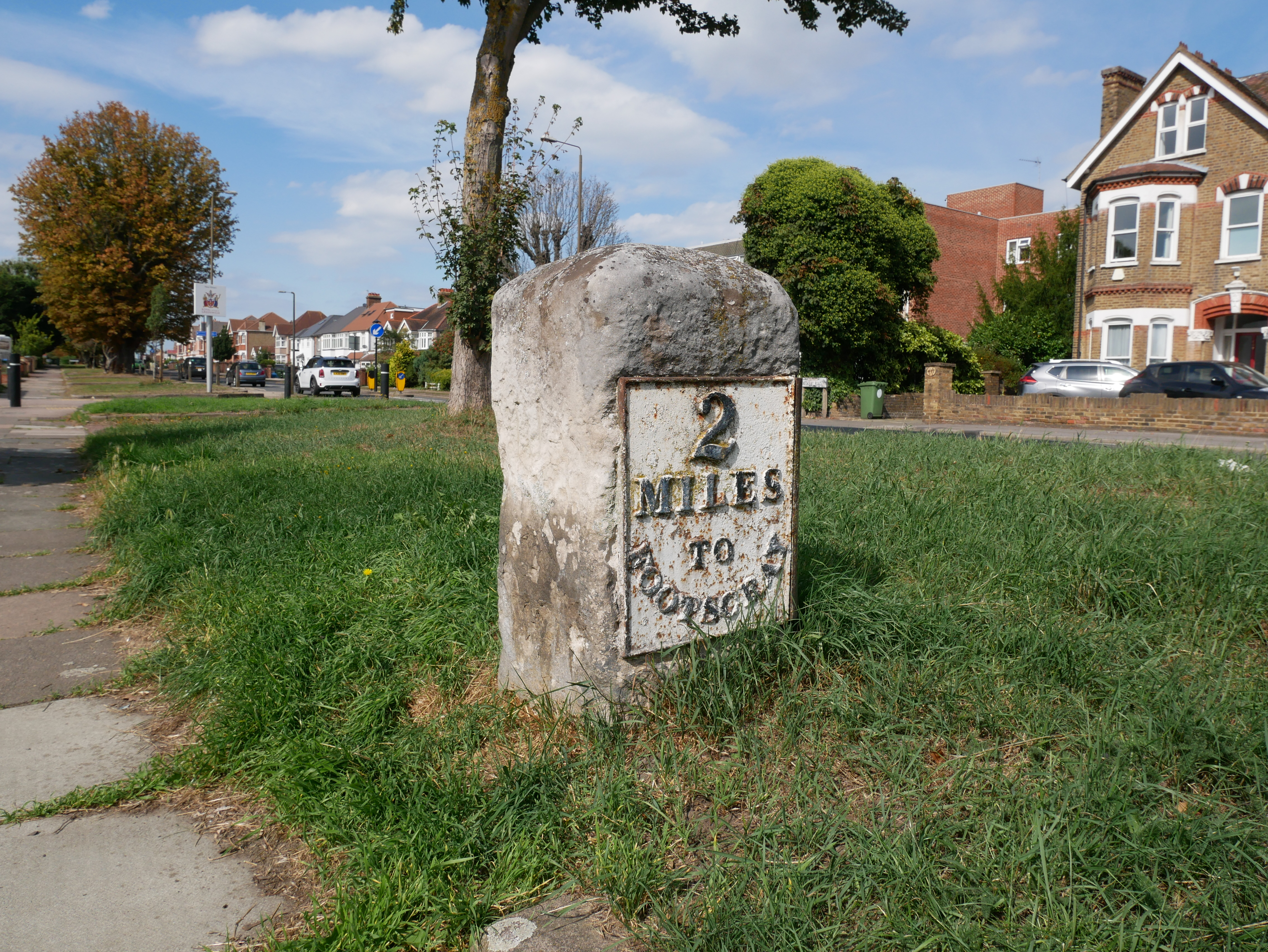
An 18th-century milestone, now Grade II listed, along Footscray Road in Longlands

On Main Road there are a small number of shops including: an off license/convenience store, a fish and chip shop, a restaurant, a launderette and a small post office. Shops here seem to be somewhat overshadowed by nearby larger towns, New Eltham and especially Sidcup. Within Longlands, the place gives it name to Longlands Recreation Ground, Longlands Primary School, Longlands Road and Longlands Park Crescent. Also found within the ward of Longlands are Queen Mary's Hospital, Frognal Corner Roundabout, Sidcup Fire Station, Sidcup Place, two primary schools, Longlands primary school and Dulverton Primary School, one secondary school, St Mary and St Joseph's Catholic School, and a small college. These are all part of the Sidcup post town, with the exception of Dulverton Primary School which occupies the small westerly part of the ward that overlaps into the SE9 Postcode district, that is within the London post town. The small river Wyncham Stream also flows from Chislehurst northward through Longlands toward Lamorbey and finally into the River Shuttle.

== Transport ==
=== Rail ===
The closest National Rail stations to Longlands are New Eltham and Sidcup.

=== Buses ===
Longlands is served by two Transport for London bus services.

- 233 to Eltham and to Swanley via Sidcup
- 321 to New Cross via Eltham and Lewisham and to Foots Cray via Sidcup (24 Hour Service)

=== Roads ===
Two A roads pass through Longlands, the A20 "Sidcup By-Pass Road", a dual carriageway, which runs from New Cross until it joins the M20 in Swanley, and the A211 called "Foots Cray Road" and "Main Road". They both run from northwest to southeast, the A20 being the southernmost; on both these roads Longlands sits between New Eltham and Sidcup. These A roads begin some distance apart, come closer together, they then run parallel for a short length at Longlands but move apart again without ever directly meeting. A large concrete wall separating the roads as they run parallel.

== Politics and government ==
Most of Longlands is within the Longlands ward of the London Borough of Bexley, with the southern part in the Chislehurst ward of Bromley.

For elections to the House of Commons, the area falls within the Old Bexley and Sidcup constituency, currently represented by Louie French of the Conservative Party, and Eltham and Chislehurst, currently represented by Clive Efford of the Labour Party,
