= Braeburn Park =

Nature reserve in Bexley, United Kingdom

Coordinates: 51.4453°N 0.1722°E

Bradlaugh Fields
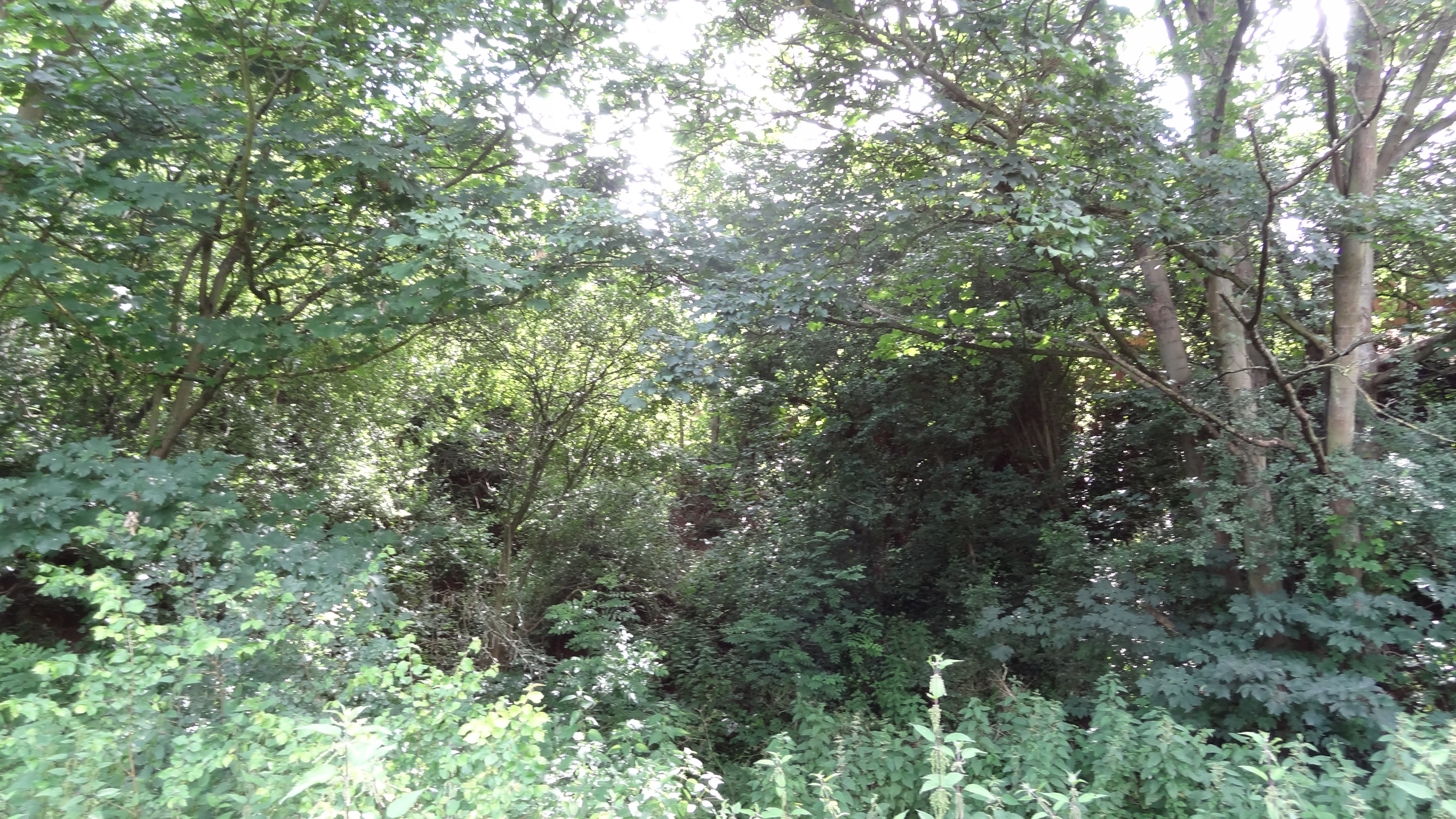
- Wansunt Pit
- Interactive map of Bradlaugh Fields
- Type: Nature reserve
- Location: London Borough of Bexley
- OS grid: TQ 506 739
- Area: 22.3 hectares (55 acres)
- Manager: London Wildlife Trust

Braeburn Park is a 22.3-hectare (55-acre) nature reserve in Crayford in the London Borough of Bexley. It is managed by the London Wildlife Trust, and includes Wansunt Pit, a 1.9-hectare (4.7-acre) geological Site of Special Scientific Interest.

The area was once used for market gardening; there were orchards, and the Old Crayford Gun Club had been based here. Later, like much of the nearby Dartford Heath, the site was extensively quarried (notably for sand), until it was finally infilled and abandoned in the 1980s; after which time it gradually reverted to nature. Habitats now include ruderal scrub, grassland and woodland. There is a wide variety of invertebrates, including rare ones such as skipping flower beetles and picture-winged flies. There is also a pond, and many common bird species. Reptiles catalogued here include the grass snake, common lizard and slow-worm. There is access to the reserve from Lower Station Road and Galloway Drive, Crayford.

A large housing development called Braeburn Park was built here by Taylor Wimpey in 2000. A promised adjacent 17 hectare nature conservation area was finally added in 2014 thanks to resources and management provided by The Land Trust and London Wildlife Trust.
