= Wansunt Pit =

UK Site of Special Scientific Interest

Coordinates: 51.441165°N 0.177015°E

- Site of Special Scientific Interest
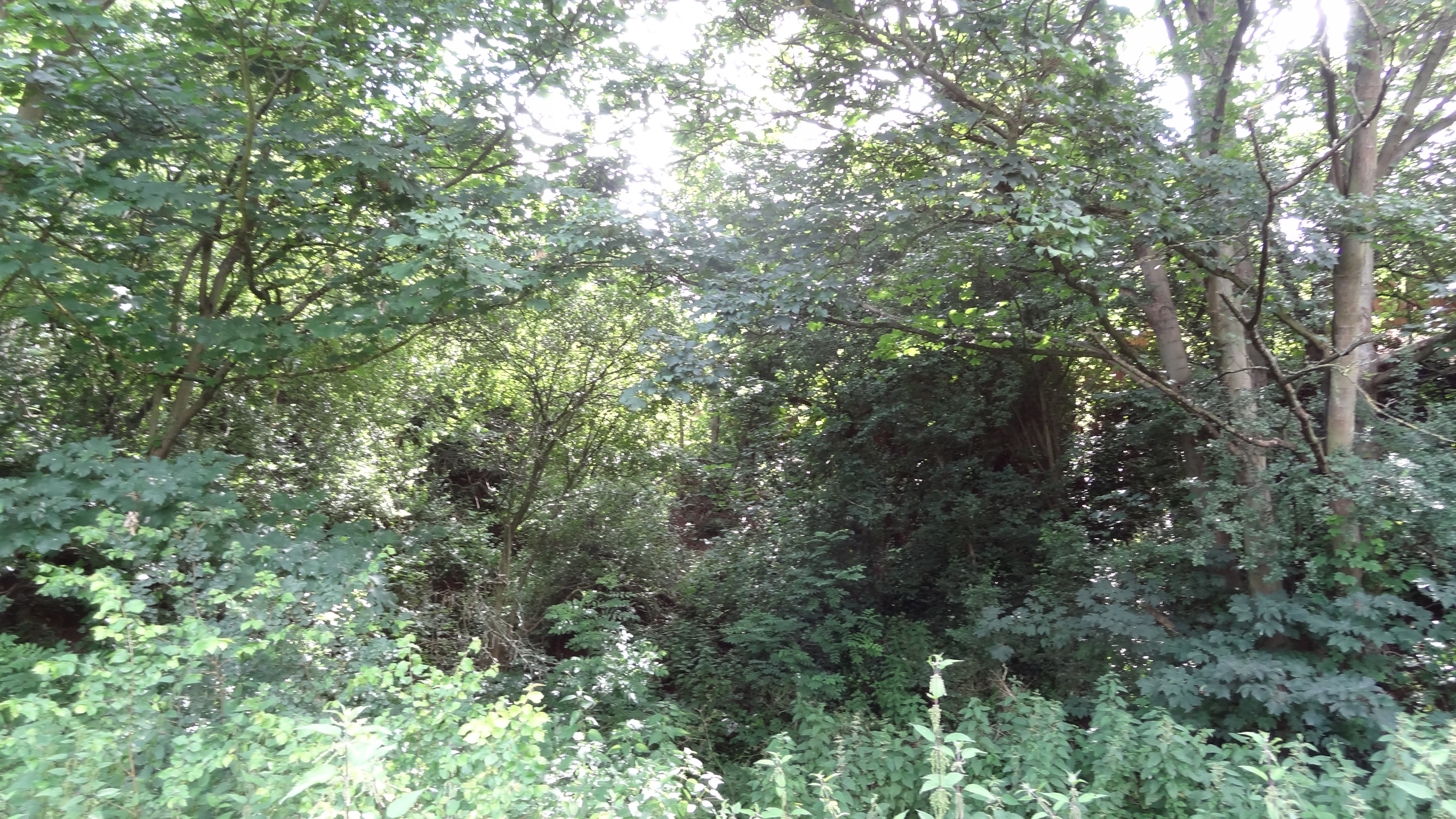
- Location of Wansunt Pit.
- Area of search: Greater London; Kent
- Grid reference: TQ514736; TQ515738
- Interest: Geological
- Area: 1.9 ha (4.7 acres)
- Notification date: 1990

Wansunt Pit is a 1.9-hectare (4.7-acre) geological Site of Special Scientific Interest in Dartford Heath between Crayford in the London Borough of Bexley and Dartford in Kent. It is also a Geological Conservation Review site. It is important geologically because it exposes the Dartford Heath Gravel, and the relationship of this exposure to the Swanscombe sequence and the Thames Terraces is a controversial issue in Thames Pleistocene studies. The site is part of Braeburn Park, a nature reserve managed by the London Wildlife Trust.

== Archaeology ==
The site is also important archaeologically. Excavations going back over a hundred years have revealed stone tools of Homo Heidelbergensis, dating from Marine Isotopic Stage 11, equivalent to the geological Hoxnian Stage, an interglacial period between 424,000 and 374,000 years ago. Other finds include sixteen Bronze Age axes and seventeen Iron Age gold armlets.

== The site ==
The site is divided into two units. The first is crossed by Galloway Drive and the second, which is inaccessible, is north west of Denton Road. Both are in an unfavourable condition.

== See also ==
- List of Sites of Special Scientific Interest in Greater London
- List of Sites of Special Scientific Interest in Kent
