= Albany Park, Bexley =

Area of south-east London, England

Coordinates: 51.4264°N 0.1026°E

Albany Park
- Suburb
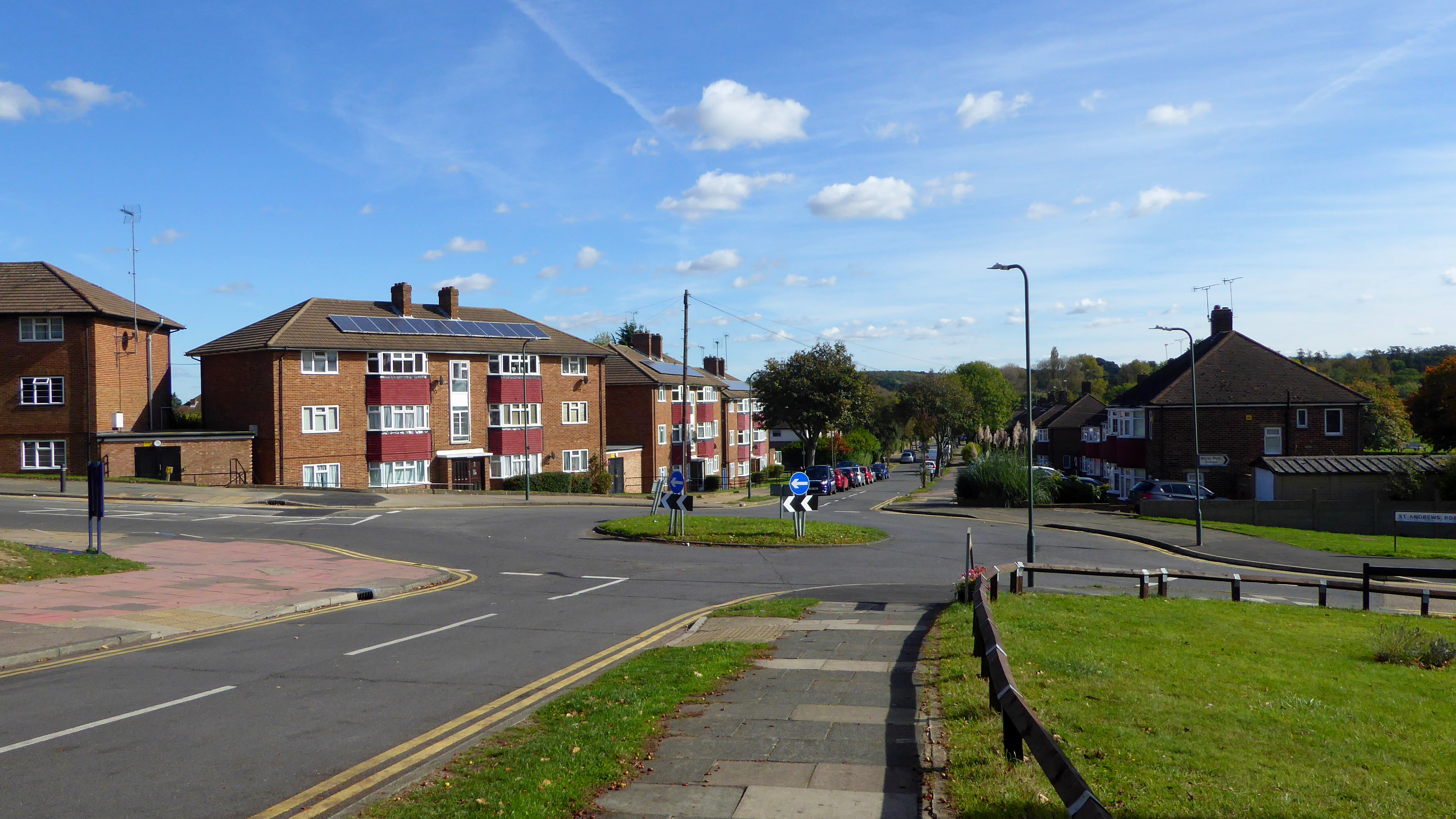
- Road in Albany Park

- Location within Greater London
- OS grid reference: TQ478728
- London borough: Bexley
- Ceremonial county: Greater London
- Region: London
- Country: England
- Sovereign state: United Kingdom
- Post town: BEXLEY
- Postcode district: DA5
- Post town: SIDCUP
- Postcode district: DA14
- Dialling code: 020
- Police: Metropolitan
- Fire: London
- Ambulance: London
- UK Parliament: Old Bexley and Sidcup
- London Assembly: Bexley and Bromley

Albany Park is an area in south east London, England, within the London Borough of Bexley. It is located 12.0 miles (19 km) south east of Charing Cross. Located midway between Sidcup and Bexley, Albany Park is situated on high ground overlooking the valleys of the River Cray and the River Shuttle.

Originally a rural area used as farmland, the settlement was established by a commercial housing developer, New Ideal Homesteads, during the 1930s. They built two estates at the site, Albany Park Estate and Royal Park Estate, which were sold at cheap prices to working-class families emigrating from Inner London. The company also brought about the foundation of Albany Park railway station in 1935, providing transport links to the estates along the Dartford Loop Line. Following decades saw a number of schools and both a Baptist church hall and an Anglican church constructed in the area, the latter of which has attracted attention for its architectural innovation.

== History ==
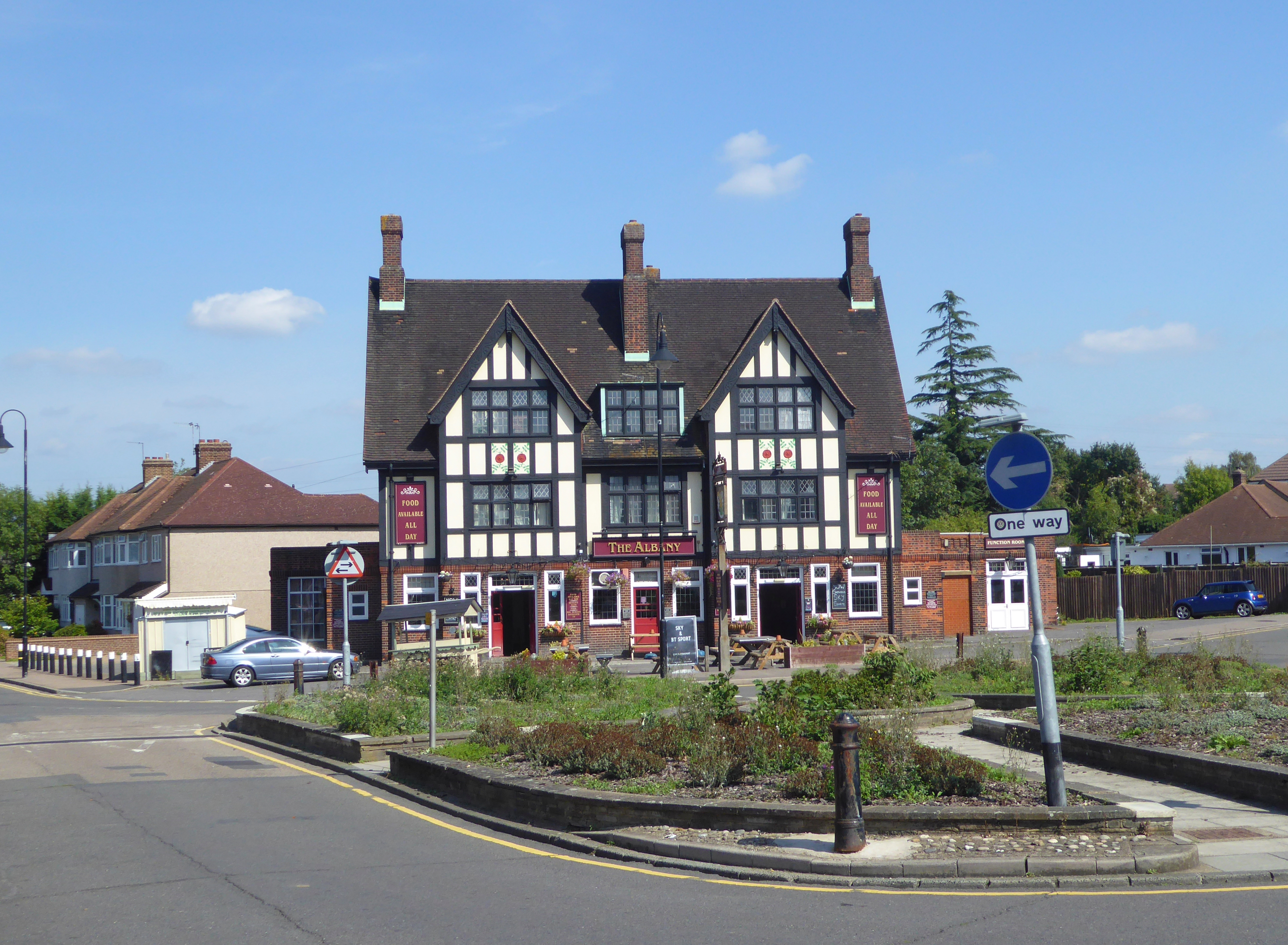
The Albany pub, a Mock Tudor building created in the 1930s

During the 1930s, New Ideal Homesteads were the largest commercial developer active in north west Kent, known for keeping costs at a minimum by using prefabricated materials. They built the Albany Park estate in the middle of that decade, on land that had formerly been the Tanyard and Hurst Farms, part of the estate of the Vansittart family who lived at nearby Foots Cray. Most of the area had consisted of fields and spinneys, although nearby there was both an eighteenth-century mansion known as Hurst or Hurst Place, and Sidcup cemetery, which had been established in 1912.

The company invented the name "Albany Park" for the housing estate that they were constructing. They built at almost double the housing density that had been recommended to them by the local Bexley council, and sold their houses at low prices, enabling them to be purchased by working-class families leaving Inner London. The estate was adjacent to the Dartford Loop Line, which had existed 1866, although NIH ensured that Albany Park railway station was opened on this line in July 1935. Next to this station were built a number of shops and the Mock Tudor Albany Hotel. Just prior to the Second World War, NIH began expanding the settlement in a south-eastward direction by beginning to build the Royal Park Estate; it was finished after the war by Bexley Borough Council.

NIH had advertised their estate with a sales brochure in which they stated that "the charming countryside shall permanently retain the rural character of its vistas and shall not suffer disfigurement in any way". The Hidden London website later commented that this claim was "implausible", characterising Albany Park as "a lacklustre pair of estates".

In 1935, Hurst Council Infant School was opened on Dorchester Avenue, with an adjacent junior school being added the following year. The two were later merged as Hurst Primary School. In 1951, Kent County Council then opened Footscray Place County Primary School on Riverside Road in 1951; it was renamed and enlarged as Royal Park School in 1954. In 1954, the Hurst Place mansion was also taken over as a community centre.

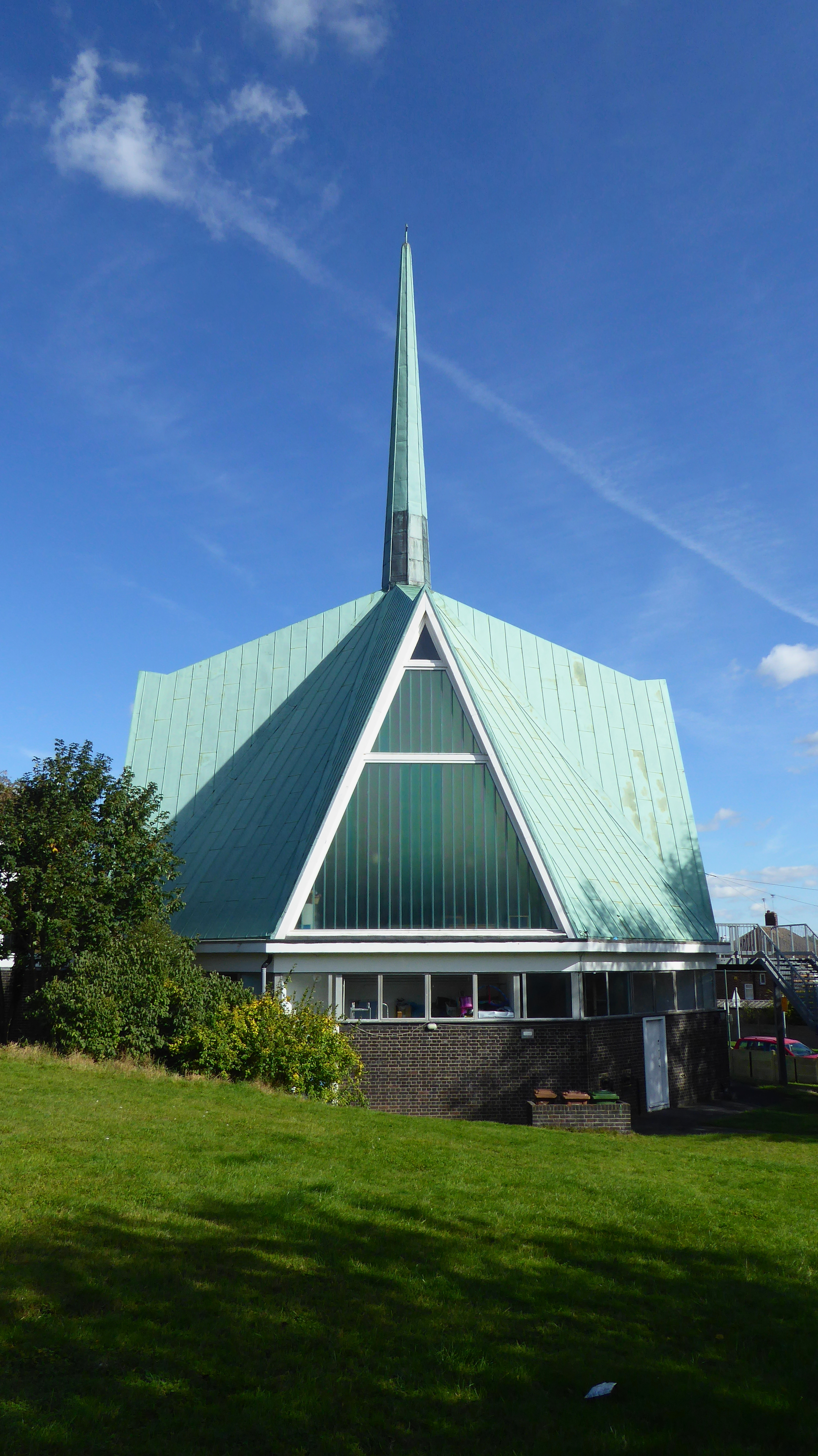
St. Andrew's, an Anglican church in the centre of the estate

Local Anglicans living on the estates found that they were two miles from the nearest Anglican church, and urged the Church of England to aid them. In 1944 the vicar of All Saints Church in Footscray began holding Anglican communion services in a room over the shops in Lewis Road, but by 1946 they were using a hall in Wren Road for this purpose. In 1954 a vicar was appointed to the town, and the Anglican community subsequently secured a plot of land in the centre of the estate on which to build a church; construction began in 1964 and was completed the following year. The historian of architecture Nikolaus Pevsner later described it as "ingenious, fashionable and slightly absurd". In 1969, Albany Park was granted parochial status by the Church of England, a special dispensation given that the area contained far fewer than the 10,000 residents normally required for such status to be granted. In 1955, the local Baptists erected a church hall in Stansted Crescent; they had intended to construct a larger church, although this never materialised.

In 2001, a number of trees were planted along the railway line adjacent to the south side of Canterbury Avenue, with the area named the Millennium Woodland. The shops on Norman Parade were later demolished and replaced by an apartment block with a convenience store; this was named Cedarwood Place and was constructed by the Belgravia Homes company.

== Geography ==
Nearest places are:

- Bexley
- Bexleyheath
- Sidcup
- Foots Cray

== Transport ==
Albany Park station serves the area with services to London Charing Cross and London Cannon Street via both Lewisham and Woolwich Arsenal as part of a loop service. There are also services to Gravesend.

Albany Park is served by three Transport for London bus services, 229, 269 and B14. that connect the area with Bexleyheath, Sidcup, Bromley, Orpington and Thamesmead.

== Amenities ==
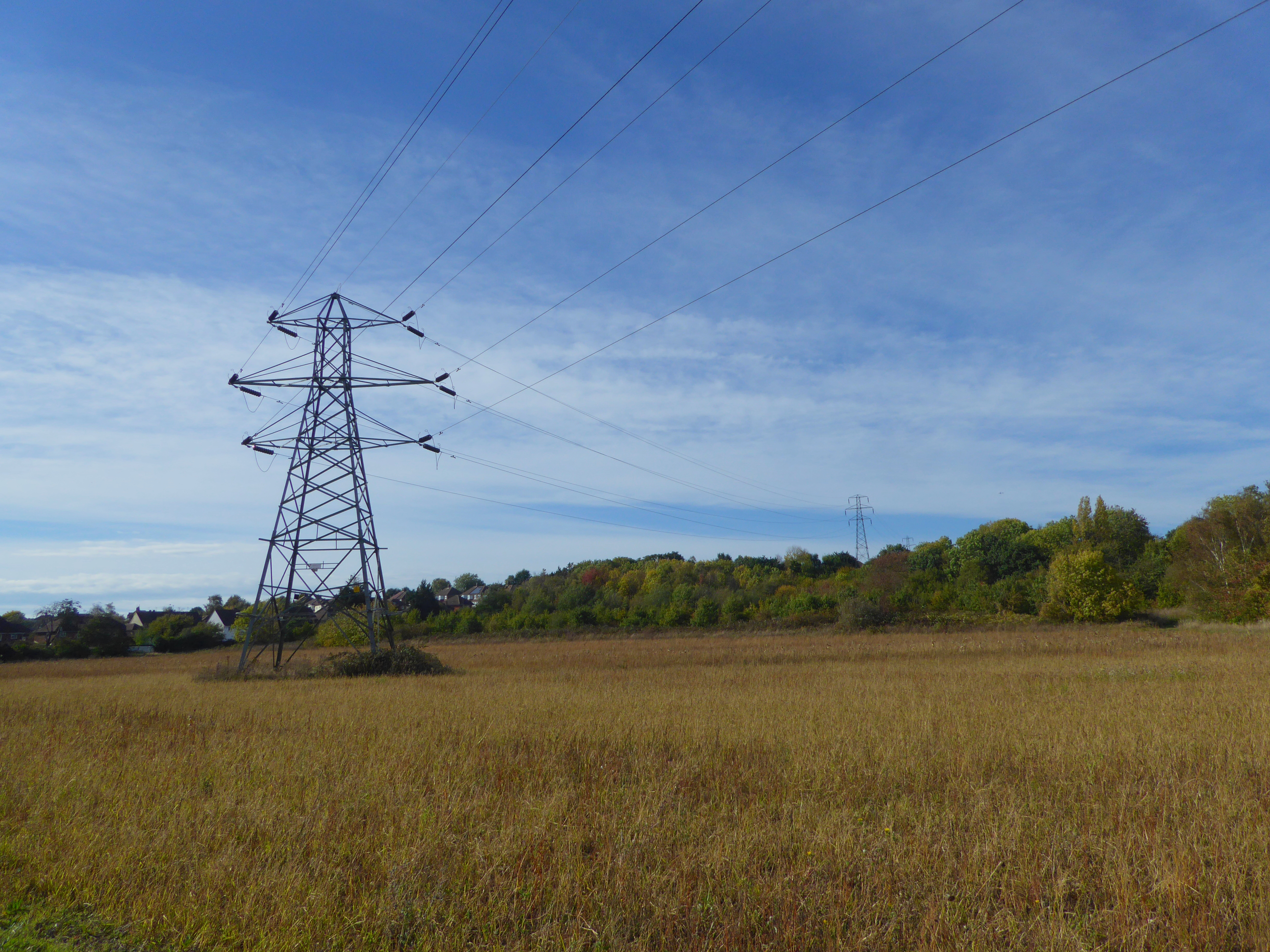
Farmland to the north of the area

Albany Park is served by two churches; the Baptist church in Stansted Crescent and the Anglican church of St Andrews which is situated on the corner of Maylands Drive and St Andrews Road and which was completed in 1965.

There are a range of local shops which adjoin the main station entrance in Steynton Avenue. These include a number of restaurants and take-aways as well as two mini-markets, a dry cleaner, a hardware store, a pet supplies shop, a party and card shop and a hairdresser.

The local pub, The Albany is also situated here as is a petrol station.

Albany Park no longer has a GP surgery following the purchase of the one that had previously been situated in Longmead Drive by another local practice. After a short while, this was closed down and no alternative provision made. The building was subsequently sold and became a Vet's practice.

The area's younger children are served by the Royal Park Primary School.

Albany Park provides access directly to Foots Cray Meadows

== See also ==
- List of schools in Bexley
