= Wyncham Stream =

River in south-east London, England

Coordinates: 51.440°N 0.092°E

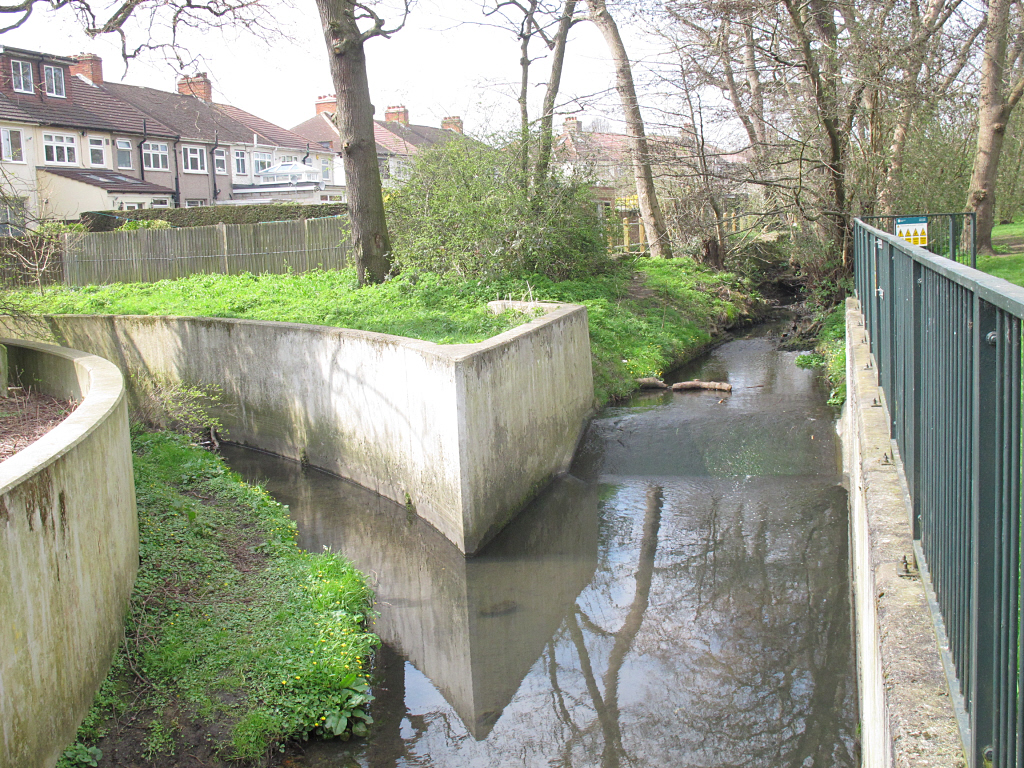

Location
- Country: England
- County: Greater London
- London Boroughs: Bromley, Bexley
- Places: Chislehurst, Longlands, Sidcup, Lamorbey, Blackfen

Physical characteristics
- Source
  - location: Chislehurst, London Borough of Bromley
  - elevation: 65 m (213 ft)
- Mouth
  - location: Blackfen, London Borough of Bexley
  - elevation: 29 m (95 ft)
- Length: 5.6 km (3.5 mi)

Wyncham Stream (Also spelt Wincham Stream) is a small river within the London Boroughs of Bexley and Bromley in southeast London, England. It is 5.6 km (3.5 mi) in length and is a tributary of the River Shuttle.

The stream rises from several sources in Chislehurst in the London Borough of Bromley and the BR7 post code area. It then flows north through Foxbury and Kemnal, with small ponds and woodlands such as Ash Grove on its course, following some of Kemnal Road and passing through the sports grounds of Flamingo Park and the Jack Nicklaus Golf Centre. It continues northeast under the Sidcup By-Pass (A20) and the adjacent Foots Cray Road (A211) into the London Borough of Bexley and DA15 post code area. It then flows under the section of railway line between Sidcup and New Eltham stations and under several residential roads, including Halfway Street (B2214), passing through Longlands, Lamorbey, on the northwest side of Sidcup. Where the stream passes under Halfway Street, the bridge here was named Wincham Bridge in the early twentieth century, and Vincent Bridge in the nineteenth century. The stream then passes through some small green areas including allotments, the small Beverley Wood, and finally flows into Blackfen where it joins the longer River Shuttle in Hollyoak Wood Park.

Some of the stream's course lies between the backs of domestic gardens, while in other places some roads have been built with a separate lane either side of the river with narrow grassy banks. Some of the small nearby residential roads have river-related names, such as Wyncham Avenue, taken directly from the river, but also: Brooklands Road, Brookend Road, and Shuttle Close after the River Shuttle.
