= Bostall Heath and Woods =

Woodlands in Greenwich, London, England, UK

Coordinates: 51.4819°N 0.1129°E

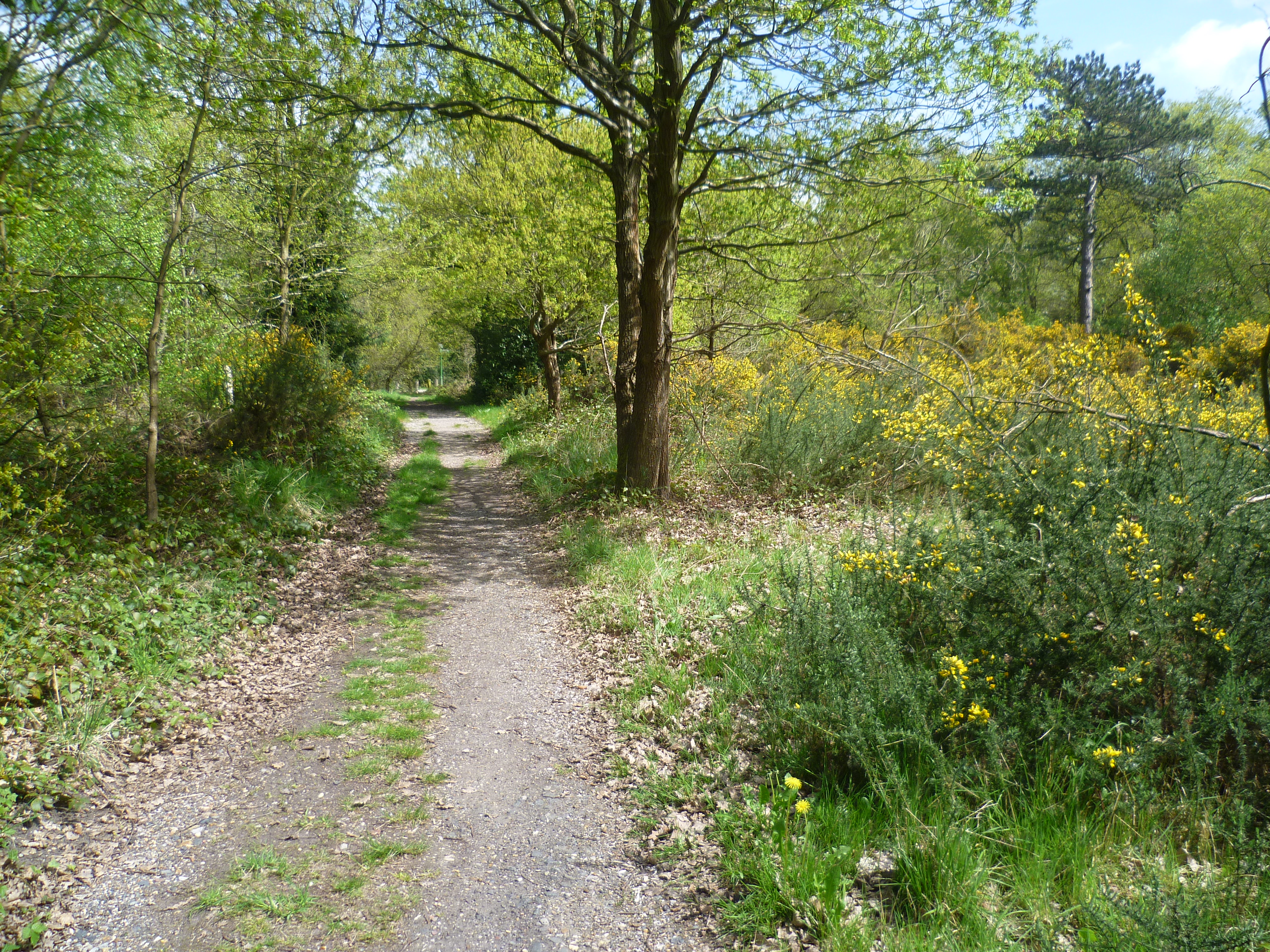
Gorse alongside the Green Chain Walk on Bostall Heath

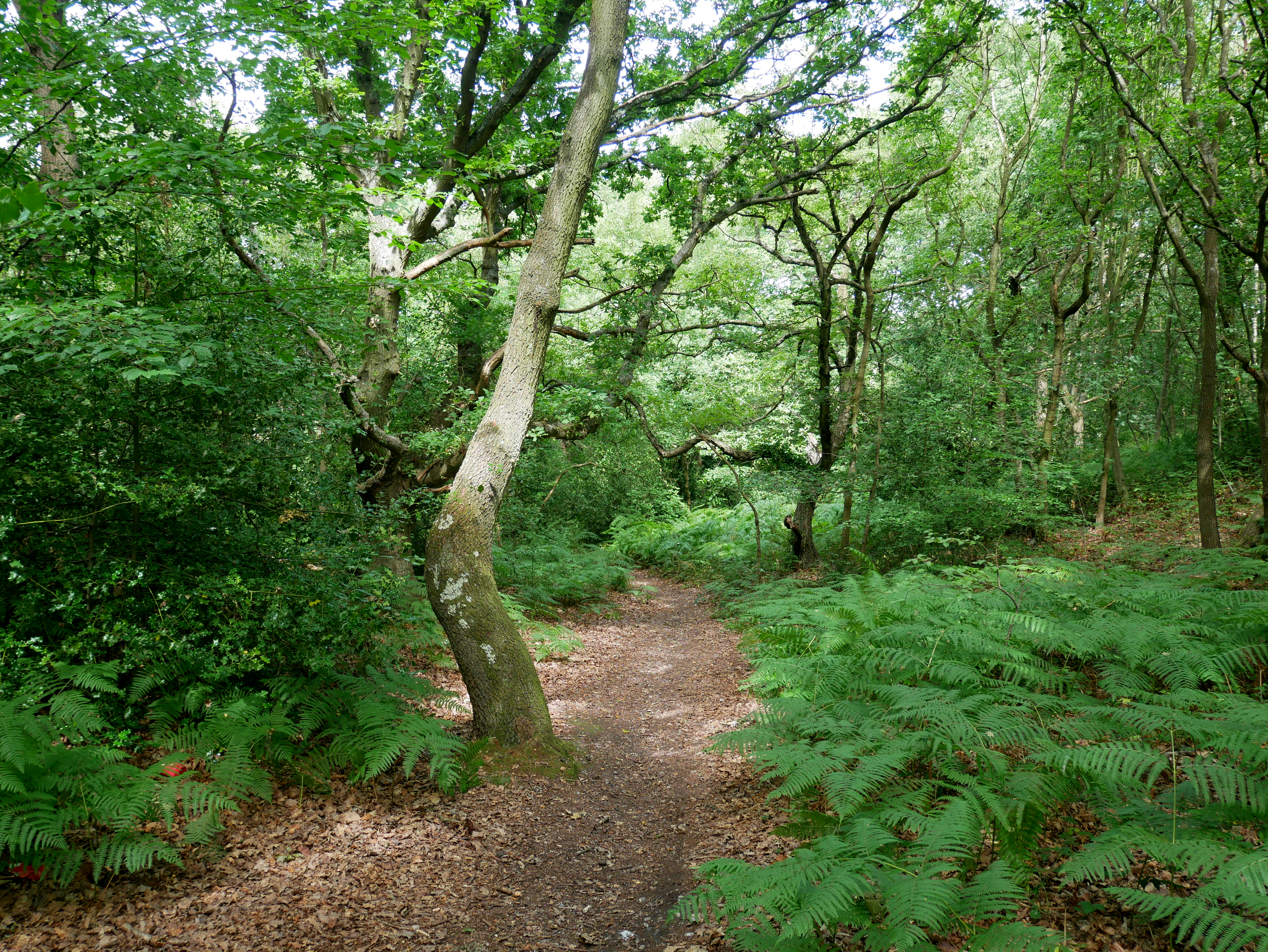
A path through the eastern side of the woods

Bostall Heath and Woods is an area of 159.1 hectares of woodland with areas of heathland located in the Royal Borough of Greenwich and London Borough of Bexley wards of Abbey Wood, west of the adjacent 73-hectare Lesnes Abbey Woods in southeast London. The area to the south of the A206 (Bostall Hill) is Bostall Woods; to the north is Bostall Heath.

== Background ==
The wood is owned and maintained by the Royal Borough of Greenwich. This excludes the Cooperative Woods, in the north east corner of the site, which in 1988 was gifted to the newly formed Greenwich & Bexley Community Hospice by the local community-owned Royal Arsenal Co-operative Society (RACS: founded in 1872 to serve locals and workers at the Royal Arsenal). The farm and a few residual tracts of ornamental verges between the homes and streets built below Bostall Woods and named by the RACS over a century ago remain the last historically significant landholdings of what was once one of Kent's largest and longest lasting employers.

== Sport and recreation facilities ==
On Bostall Heath there are a bowling green, cricket nets and casual soccer facilities. It is part of the Green Chain Walk network.

== Access ==
Bostall Heath and Woods is located within a mostly residential area and is accessible to the public from a number of points at all times. There are also public transport links. The nearest railway station is Abbey Wood railway station, the heath is served by buses B11 and 99 and the wood by B11, 99, 177, 180, 96, and 422.
