= Albany Park railway station =

National Rail station in London, England

Albany Park
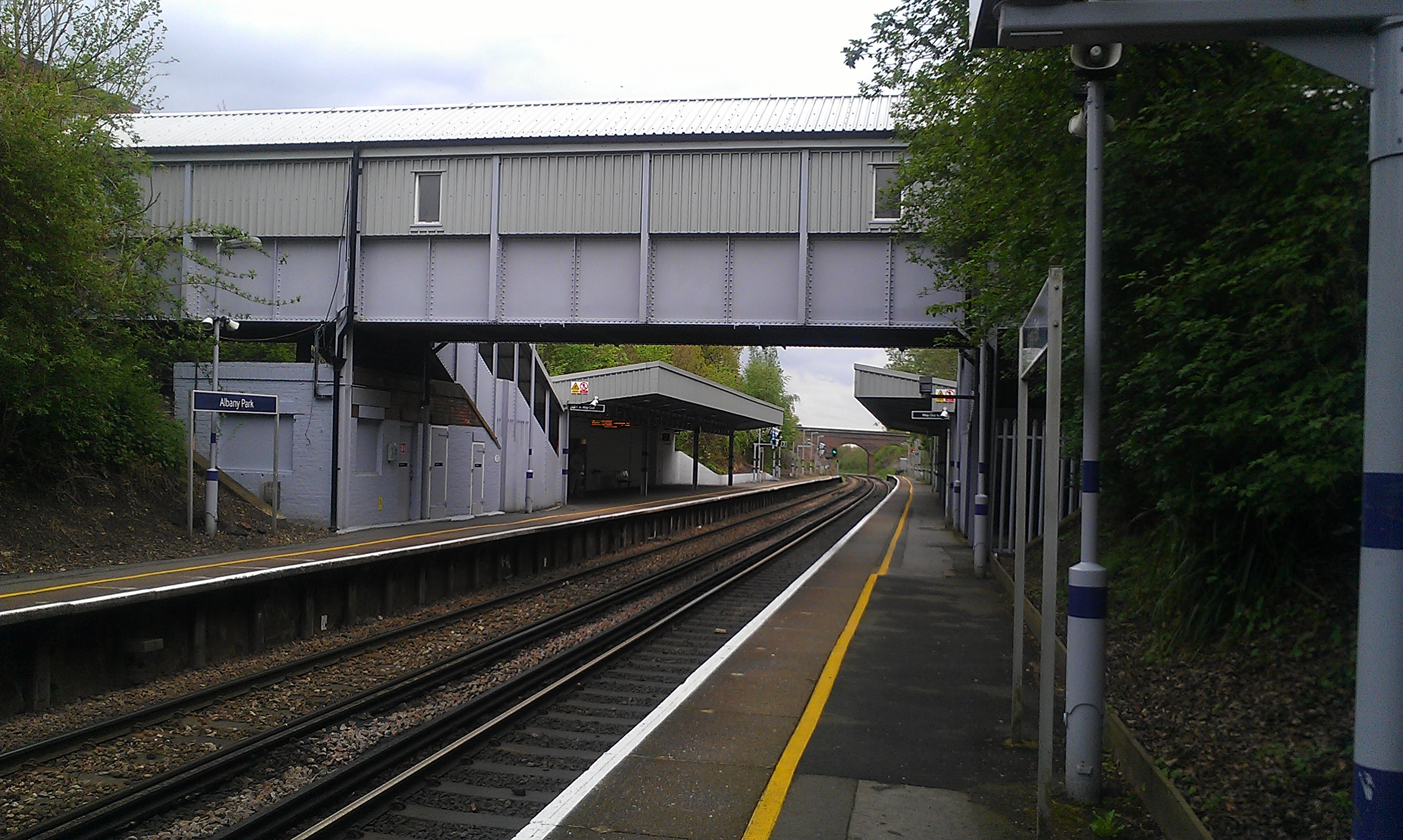
- Interactive map of Albany Park

General information
- Location: Albany Park
- Local authority: London Borough of Bexley
- Managed by: Southeastern
- Station code: AYP
- DfT category: D
- Number of platforms: 2
- Fare zone: 5

National Rail annual entry and exit
- 2020–21: ▼0.213 million
- 2021–22: ▲0.510 million
- 2022–23: ▲0.622 million
- 2023–24: ▲0.661 million
- 2024–25: ▲0.775 million

Key dates
- 7 March 1935: Opened

Other information
- External links: Departures; Facilities
- Coordinates: 51.4354°N 0.1257°E

Albany Park railway station is in the London Borough of Bexley in south-east London (London fare zone 5). It is 12 miles 68 chains (20.7 km) down the line from Charing Cross. The station and all trains serving it are operated by Southeastern.

From platform one trains run westbound to London Charing Cross twice an hour, and twice per hour during the daytime, Monday to Saturday, to London Cannon Street.

From platform two trains from the station run eastbound towards Dartford continuing to Gravesend twice per hour (or Strood, Rochester or Gillingham during peak times) and to London Cannon Street via Greenwich twice an hour during the daytime, Monday to Saturday.

== History ==
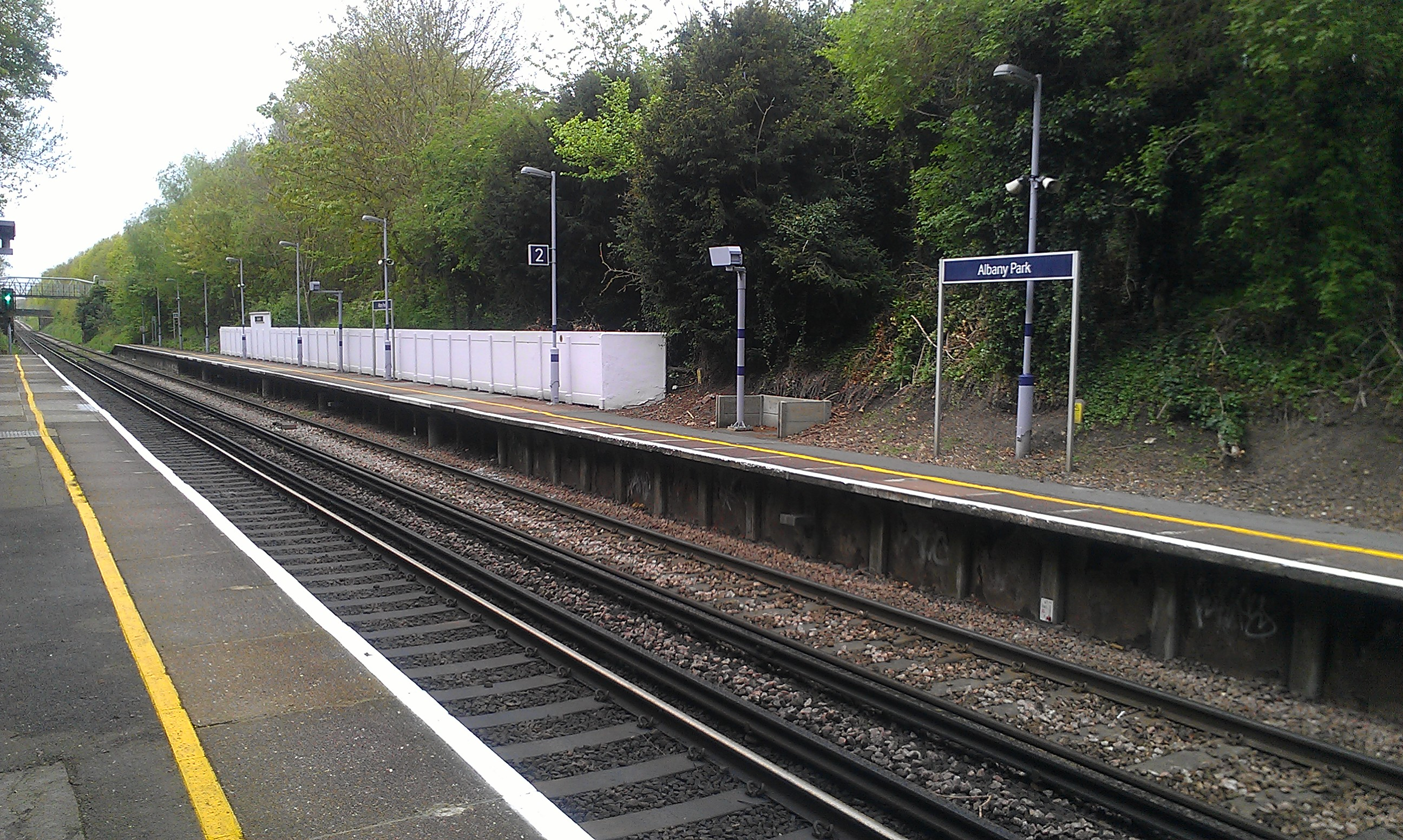
The train platform.

The station was opened by the Southern Railway on 7 March 1935 following housing development in the area. The station passed on to the Southern Region of British Railways on nationalisation in 1948.

When BR was divided into sectors in the 1980s the station was served by Network SouthEast until the privatisation of British Rail.

The station had a very small one storey signal box at the Dartford end of the up platform which closed in November 1970. No goods yard or freight facilities were ever provided.

The station has changed very little over the years except for platform extensions in 1955 and the closure of the signal box.

== Location ==
The station is located in Steynton Avenue near a small parade of shops in a largely residential area. The station building is at street level with steps down to the platforms as the line is in a cutting. There is no actual park called Albany Park, although there is nearby pub The Albany Hotel also built in the 1930s.

== Services ==
All services at Albany Park are operated by Southeastern using Class 376, 465, 466 and 707 EMUs.

The typical off-peak service in trains per hour is:

- 4 tph to London Charing Cross (2 of these run direct and 2 run via Lewisham)
- 4 tph to Dartford of which 2 continue to Gravesend

Additional services, including trains to and from London Cannon Street via either Lewisham, or via Woolwich Arsenal and Greenwich, and to London Blackfriars call at the station during the peak hours.

| Preceding station | National Rail | Following station |
|---|---|---|
| Sidcup | Southeastern Dartford Loop Line | Bexley |

== Connections ==
London Buses route B14 serves the station from Longmead Drive towards both Bexleyheath and Orpington.
