= River Shuttle =

Small tributary of the River Cray in London, United Kingdom

Coordinates: 51°26′46″N 0°09′23″E

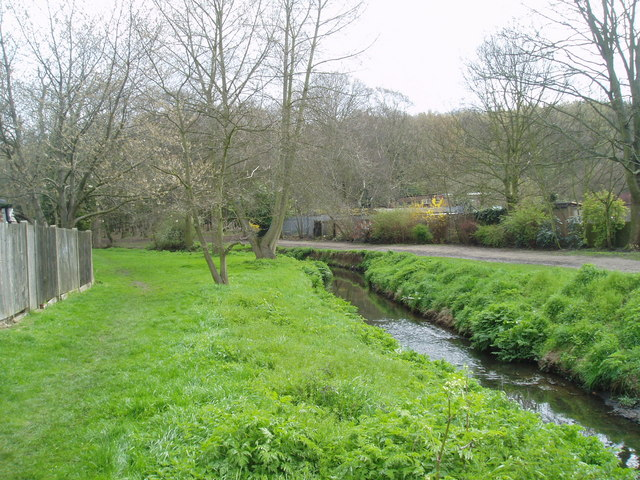
The river in Bexley

The River Shuttle is a small tributary of the River Cray in London, United Kingdom.

The river rises at two or more springs between Avery Hill and Eltham in the Royal Borough of Greenwich at the junction of the permeable Blackheath Beds and the denser Woolwich Beds. It flows east through the parkland of Avery Hill, then crosses into the London Borough of Bexley and continues through Parish Wood Park and Hollyoak Wood Park, Willersley Park, Marlborough Park and Sidcup Golf Course, where it feeds a lake in the grounds of Lamorbey Mansion (c. 1750) a house now within the Rose Bruford College campus. Continuing east, it flows through Bexley Woods and then follows the south side of the major A2 London-to-Dover road and through the grounds of Beths Grammar School until it flows into the River Cray just south of Hall Place.

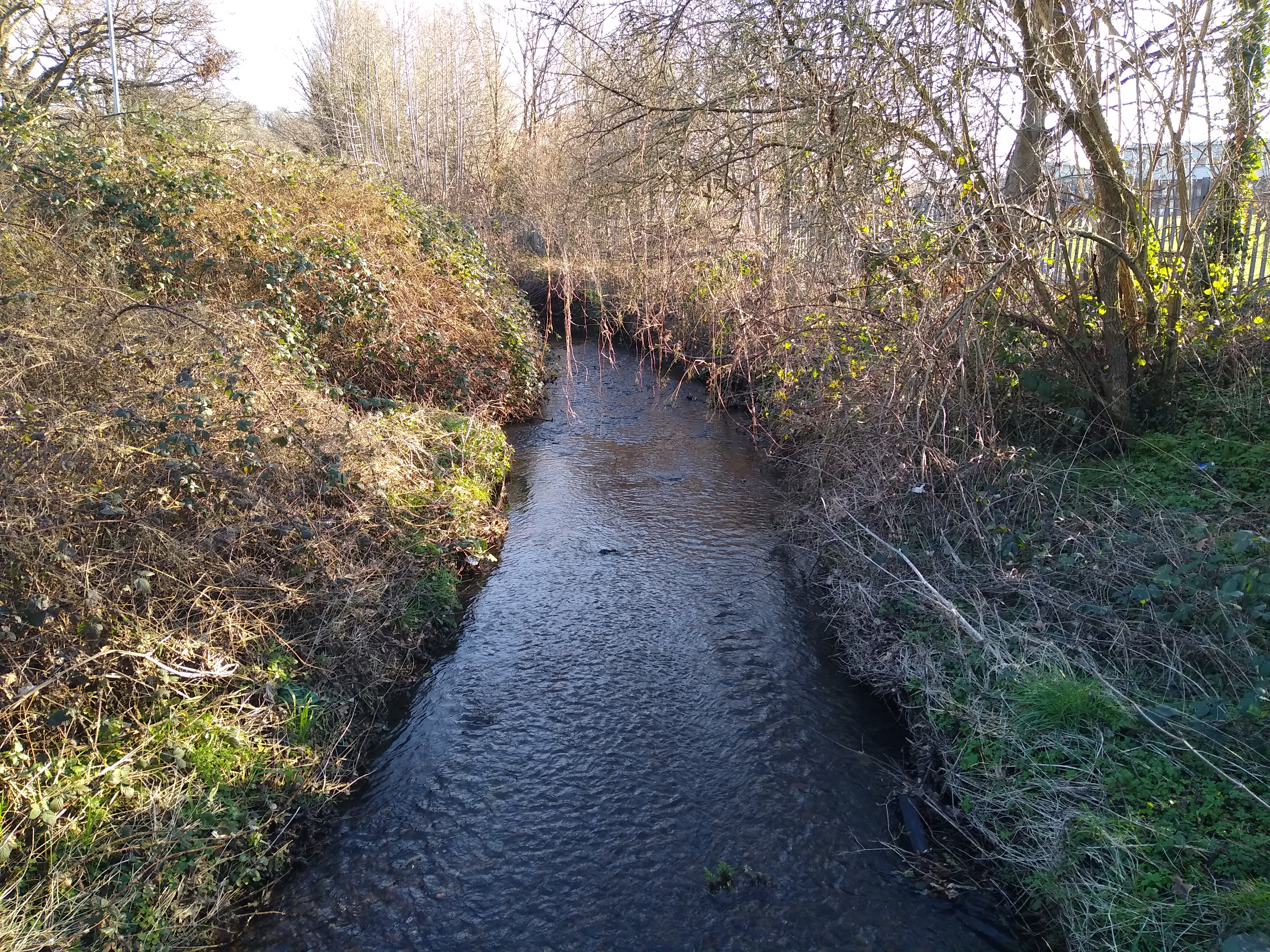
The river in Bexley

A walk called the Shuttle Riverway follows the river for its entire length of five miles (about 8 km). This was created following a persistent campaign by Donald Stringer of Brookdale Road. The walk follows the river where possible but also uses woods, parks, alleyways and some linking roads.

A tributary, the Wyncham Stream, flows into the Shuttle in Hollyoak Wood Park. Its route from the Sports Grounds on the A20 to Holly Oak Park, takes it past Dulverton Primary School, under the Dartford to London via Sidcup railway line, the Old Farm Avenue allotments and under Halfway Street.
