= Grade II listed buildings in the London Borough of Bexley =

This page is a list of the 101 Grade II listed buildings in the London Borough of Bexley. There are also four Grade II-listed entries on the Register of Historic Parks and Gardens of Special Historic Interest in England.

== Listed buildings ==
Name	Location	Type	Completed (Note: The date given is the date used by Historic England as significant for the initial building or that of an important part in the structure's description.)	Date designated	Grid ref. (Note: Sometimes known as OSGB36, the grid reference is based on the British national grid reference system used by the Ordnance Survey.) Geo-coordinates	Entry number (Note: The "List Entry Number" is a unique number assigned to each listed building and scheduled monument by Historic England.)	Image
1 and 3, Bexley High Street	Bexley	Houses	Late 18th century	17 December 1980	TQ 49304 73616	1064242	1 and 3, Bexley High Street
2 K6 telephone kiosks outside Number 11	Bourne Road, Bexley	Telephone booths	1935	13 July 1987	TQ 49582 73654	1064213	2 K6 telephone kiosks outside Number 11
7 and 9, Bexley High Street, Bexley	Bexley	Houses	18th century	17 December 1980	TQ 49326 73615	1359376	7 and 9, Bexley High Street, Bexley
8 Upton Road	Bexleyheath	House	c. 1856	17 December 1980	TQ 48162 75320; 51°27′27″N 0°07′52″E	1064205	8 Upton Road More images
10–16, Burnt Oak Lane	Sidcup	Houses	1874	11 September 1985	TQ 46163 72993; 51°26′14″N 0°06′05″E	1359401	10–16, Burnt Oak Lane More images
16, North Cray Road	Bexley	House	Late 18th century	17 December 1980	TQ 49726 73373	1064235	16, North Cray Road
25 and 27 Halfway Street	Sidcup	Houses	15th or 16th century	17 December 1980	TQ 46094 72917	1188383	25 and 27 Halfway Street
28 and 30, Erith High Street	Erith	Houses	18th century	3 July 1973	TQ 51557 78091	1064227	28 and 30, Erith High Street More images
Number 33 (Farm Cottage) and Number 35	Halfway Street, Sidcup	Houses	Probably 16th century	17 December 1980	TQ 46051 72920; 51°26′11″N 0°05′59″E	1359412	Upload Photo
34, North Cray Road	Bexley	House	c. 17th or early 18th century	17 December 1980	TQ 49698 73289	1188453	34, North Cray Road
34 and 36, Bexley High Street	Bexley	Houses	1787	17 December 1980	TQ 49424 73546	1064246	34 and 36, Bexley High Street
56–62, Bexley Lane	Crayford	House	18th century	17 December 1980	TQ 51182 74836	1359380	56–62, Bexley Lane
57 and 59, Bexley High Street, Bexley	Bexley	Houses	Late 17th or early 18th century	1 October 1953	TQ 49448 73590	1359377	57 and 59, Bexley High Street, Bexley
64, Bexley Lane	Crayford	House	Late 18th or early 19th century	17 December 1980	TQ 51171 74831	1188219	64, Bexley Lane
71 Danson Road	Bexleyheath	House	1934	18 July 2003	TQ 47623 74859	1390524	71 Danson Road
101–105, Bexley High Street, Bexley	Bexley	Houses	Mid-18th century	5 August 1974	TQ 49656 73527	1359378	101–105, Bexley High Street, Bexley
Number 152 (Rose Cottage) and Number 154	North Cray Road, North Cray	Houses	c. 16th–17th centuries	17 December 1980	TQ 48803 72307; 51°25′49″N 0°08′21″E	1064237	Number 152 (Rose Cottage) and Number 154
172, 172A and 172B, Old Road	Crayford	Houses	17th century	17 December 1980	TQ 51261 74994	1064223	172, 172A and 172B, Old Road
180–188, Rectory Lane	Foots Cray	Houses	1737	25 August 1954	TQ 47379 71011	1188531	180–188, Rectory Lane
Abbeyhill (Montrose Park Residents Club)	158 Hurst Road, Sidcup	House	c. 1830	17 December 1980	TQ 47143 73062	1064230	Abbeyhill (Montrose Park Residents Club)
Albion Villas	65 and 67 Woolwich Road, Bexleyheath	Houses	1866	3 December 1982	TQ 49221 75504	1064209	Albion Villas
Barn at Hall Place	Bourne Road, Bexley	Barn	17th century	1 October 1953	TQ 50210 74328	1359381	Barn at Hall Place More images
Bexley College (former Erith Technical Institute) including attached walls railings and gatepiers	Erith Road, Belvedere	School	1906	23 July 1999	TQ 49823 78412	1387547	Bexley College (former Erith Technical Institute) including attached walls railings and gatepiers
Bowling Pavilion, Foots Cray Place	Rectory Lane, Foots Cray	Garden building	1903	17 July 1989	TQ 47421 71610	1064215	Bowling Pavilion, Foots Cray Place More images
Brooklands	38 Bexley Lane, Crayford	House	18th century	20 May 1952	TQ 51240 74862	1188215	Brooklands
Caretaker's House at Lamorbey Park	Burnt Oak Lane, Sidcup	House	c. 1790	17 December 1980	TQ 46540 73210	1064221	Caretaker's House at Lamorbey Park
Chapel House	497 Blackfen Road, Sidcup	House	1761	17 December 1980	TQ 47296 74256	1064248	Chapel House More images
Christ Church Parish Church	Broadway, Bexleyheath	Church	1877	17 December 1980	TQ 48855 75334	1359404	Christ Church Parish Church More images
Christ Church Vicarage	Broadway, Bexleyheath	House	1868	17 December 1980	TQ 48894 75365	1064219	Christ Church Vicarage More images
Clock Tower at west angle of Market Place	Broadway, Bexleyheath	Clocktower	1911	17 December 1980	TQ 49236 75239	1064220	Clock Tower at west angle of Market Place More images
Coal Duty Boundary Marker (in the fence to the back of the garden of Number 57 Baldwyn's Park) and adjacent iron bollard	Tile Kiln Lane, Bexley	Coal tax post	1861	17 December 1980	TQ 50671 72493	1188545	Coal Duty Boundary Marker (in the fence to the back of the garden of Number 57 Baldwyn's Park) and adjacent iron bollard
Coal Duty Boundary Marker (in the grounds of the Old Orchard)	East Rochester Way, Bexley	Coal tax post	1861	17 December 1980	TQ 51197 73967	1064226	Upload Photo
Coal Duty Boundary Marker (on foreshore, at mouth of River Darenth, West Bank)	near Wallhouse Road, North End	Coal tax post	1851	17 December 1980	TQ 54013 78078	1064206	Coal Duty Boundary Marker (on foreshore, at mouth of River Darenth, West Bank) More images
Coal Duty Boundary Marker (on the east side of Railway Line, north side of Stanham River)	Willow Walk, Crayford	Coal tax post	1851	17 December 1980	TQ 53146 75093	1064208	Upload Photo
Coal Duty Boundary Marker (on the south side of Number 1)	Dartford Road, Bexley	Coal tax post	1861	17 December 1980	TQ 50701 72875	1188345	Coal Duty Boundary Marker (on the south side of Number 1) More images
Coal Duty Boundary Marker (on west side opposite Number 205)	Station Road, Crayford	Coal tax post	1861	17 December 1980	TQ 51640 73865	1359398	Coal Duty Boundary Marker (on west side opposite Number 205)
Cray Hall	141 North Cray Road, North Cray	House	c. 1830	17 December 1980	TQ 48481 71142	1064240	Cray Hall
Cray House	96 Bexley High Street, Bexley	House	Late 18th century	1 October 1953	TQ 49668 73488	1064247	Cray House More images
Crayford War Memorial in grounds of Crayford Manor	Grounds of Crayford Manor, Mayplace Road East, Dartford, Crayford, London DA1 4HB	War memorial	1954	13 November 2012	TQ5099375500	1410311	Crayford War Memorial in grounds of Crayford Manor More images
The Crook Log Public House	Crook Log, Bexleyheath	Pub	18th century	17 December 1980	TQ 47818 75496	1359408	The Crook Log Public House More images
Dairy at Lamorbey Park	Burnt Oak Lane, Sidcup	Dairy	c. 1790	17 December 1980	TQ 46522 73182	1359406	Upload Photo
Dower House	North Cray Road, North Cray	House	c. 1820	17 December 1980	TQ 48751 72138	1294717	Dower House
East Wickham Farmhouse	Wickham Street, East Wickham	House	Possibly 15th century	17 December 1980	TQ 46618 76859	1359400	East Wickham Farmhouse
Erith (Christ Church) War Memorial	Christ Church, Victoria Road, Erith DA8 3AN	War memorial		10 April 2017	TQ5122977911	1445231	Erith (Christ Church) War Memorial More images
Erith Library	Walnut Tree Road, Erith	Library	1906	7 March 1996	TQ 51322 78072	1255449	Erith Library More images
First World War Memorial at St John the Baptist Church, Erith	St John the Baptist Churchyard, West Street, Erith, London DA8 1AN	War memorial	1921	19 October 2017	TQ5077978700	1445491	First World War Memorial at St John the Baptist Church, Erith More images
Five Arch Bridge	North Cray Road, Foots Cray Meadows, North Cray	Bridge	c. 1781	17 December 1980	TQ 48227 71880	1188471	Five Arch Bridge More images
Former Fosters Primary School	Upper Wickham Lane, Bexley	School	1879	20 November 1997	TQ4666676137	1031526	Former Fosters Primary School
Garden walls to north of Frognal House	Frognal Avenue, Sidcup	Walls	18th century	17 December 1980	TQ 46506 70866	1359411	Garden walls to north of Frognal House
Granary approximately 25 metres south south east of Hall Place	Bourne Road, Bexley	Granary	Early 19th century	17 December 1980	TQ5019574314	1064233	Granary approximately 25 metres south south east of Hall Place More images
Granary at Little Mascal Farm	Cocksure Lane, North Cray	Granary	Early 19th century	25 October 1985	TQ 49197 72154	1064210	Upload Photo
High Street House	123 Bexley High Street, Bexley	House	1761	1 October 1953	TQ 49730 73491	1064245	High Street House More images
Jays Cottages	1, 2, and 2A Blendon Road, Bexley	Houses	Late 18th or early 19th century	17 December 1980	TQ 47589 74249	1064249	Jays Cottages
K6 telephone kiosk	Bexley High Street, Bexley	Telephone booth	1936	13 July 1987	TQ 49416 73544	1064214	K6 telephone kiosk
The King's Head Inn	65 Bexley High Street, Bexley	Pub	16th or early 17th century	1 October 1953	TQ4951373622; 51°26′31″N 0°09′00″E	1064244	The King's Head Inn More images
Lamorbey Park (Note: This listing is for Lamorbey House, the mansion on the grounds of the bigger Lamorbey Park.)	Burnt Oak Lane, Sidcup	House		25 August 1954	TQ 46585 73138	1359405	Lamorbey Park (Note: This listing is for Lamorbey House, the mansion on the grounds of the bigger Lamorbey Park.) More images
Large Barn at Howbury Farm	Whitehall Lane, North End	Barn	Early 17th century	20 May 1952	TQ 52725 76701	1064207	Large Barn at Howbury Farm More images
Lodge to Hurstmere School	189 Hurst Road, Sidcup	School	Late 19th century	17 December 1980	TQ 47089 73064	1188388	Lodge to Hurstmere School
The Long Shed (part of David Evans Limited Factory at Number 7)	London Road, Crayford	Agricultural building	Probably 18th century	24 June 1980	TQ 51103 74779	1359413	The Long Shed (part of David Evans Limited Factory at Number 7) More images
Loring Hall	8 Water Lane, North Cray	House	c. 1760	25 August 1954	TQ 48816 72381	1359399	Loring Hall More images
Lychgate to south west of Parish Church of St Mary the Virgin	Manor Road, Bexley	Gate	Late 19th century	17 December 1980	TQ 49769 73422	1064232	Lychgate to south west of Parish Church of St Mary the Virgin More images
Lychgate to west of Parish Church of St Paulinus	Perry Street, Crayford	Gate	Late 19th century	17 December 1980	TQ 51143 75108	1064200	Lychgate to west of Parish Church of St Paulinus More images
The Manor House	Manor Road, Bexley	House	c. 1536	17 December 1980	TQ4984773485	1294730	The Manor House
Manor House	The Green, Sidcup	House	Late 18th century	25 August 1954	TQ 46257 71565	1064229	Manor House More images
Milestone on pavement slightly to south of axis of Numbers 494	Footscray Road, Longlands	Milestone	18th century	8 June 1973	TQ 44431 72575	1358949	Milestone on pavement slightly to south of axis of Numbers 494 More images
North Cray War Memorial	St James Church, North Cray Road, North Cray	War memorial	1920	3 July 2017	TQ4842971761	1444904	North Cray War Memorial More images
The Old House	170 Rectory Lane, Foots Cray	House	Early 19th century	25 August 1954	TQ 47398 71034	1359396	The Old House
One Bell Public House	170 Old Road, Crayford, London DA1 4DY	Pub	18th century	17 December 1980	TQ 51243 74991; 51°27′13″N 0°10′31″E	1064198	One Bell Public House More images
Orchard House	62 Woolwich Road, Bexleyheath DA7 4HU	House	Early to mid-19th century	17 December 1980	TQ 49192 75460	1294681	Orchard House More images
Original building of former Bexley National Schools	Bourne Road, Bexley	School	1834	30 August 1974	TQ 49605 73885	1188284	Original building of former Bexley National Schools
Outhouse to north east of Red House	Red House Lane, Bexleyheath	Outhouse	1859	17 December 1980	TQ 48146 75136	1064204	Outhouse to north east of Red House More images
Parish Church of All Saints	Nuxley Road, Belvedere	Church	1853	17 December 1980	TQ 49256 78289	1064197	Parish Church of All Saints More images
Parish Church of St James	North Cray Road, North Cray	Church	1637–1871	17 December 1980	TQ 48406 71755	1064238	Parish Church of St James More images
Parish Church of St John the Evangelist	Parkhill Road, Bexley	Church	1882	17 December 1980	TQ 49088 73667	1064199	Parish Church of St John the Evangelist More images
Parish Church of St John the Evangelist	Church Avenue, Sidcup	Church	1901	17 December 1980	TQ 46454 71558	1064222	Parish Church of St John the Evangelist More images
Pillar box beside Number 48 at junction with Parkhurst Road	Parkhill Road, Bexley	Pillar box	c. 1872–1879	17 December 1980	TQ 49068 73716	1359433	Pillar box beside Number 48 at junction with Parkhurst Road More images
Place Cottage	The Green, Sidcup	House	Late 16th or 17th century	17 December 1980	TQ 46411 71518	1188375	Place Cottage
Post on land of Gun Club, on east side of lane which forms the west boundary of the shooting ground and the west boundary of the former Borough of Dartford	East Rochester Way, Bexley	Coal tax post	Mid-19th century	25 September 1975	TQ 51198 73966	1336368	Post on land of Gun Club, on east side of lane which forms the west boundary of the shooting ground and the west boundary of the former Borough of Dartford
The Railway Tavern	Bexley High Street, Bexley	Pub	18th century	17 December 1980	TQ 49440 73557	1359379	The Railway Tavern More images
The Royal Oak Public House	Mount Road, Bexleyheath	Pub	19th century	17 December 1980	TQ4783574818; 51°27′09″N 0°07′40″E	1064234	The Royal Oak Public House More images
Ruins of Lesnes Abbey	Abbey Road, Abbey Wood	Abbey	1178	20 May 1953	TQ 47925 78765	1359415	Ruins of Lesnes Abbey More images
The Seven Stars Public House	Foots Cray High Street, Foots Cray	Pub	c. 16th century	5 March 1974	TQ 47511 70910	1359410	The Seven Stars Public House More images
Sheffield Monument (in churchyard of Parish Church of St John the Evangelist)	Church Avenue, Sidcup	Funerary monument	1899	17 December 1980	TQ 46493 71545	1359407	Sheffield Monument (in churchyard of Parish Church of St John the Evangelist) More images
Sidcup Place (including ha ha to east)	Chislehurst Road, Sidcup	House	1750	14 December 1995	TQ 46229 71309	1117384	Sidcup Place (including ha ha to east) More images
Stable block to former Foots Cray Place	Rectory Lane, Foots Cray	Stable	c. 1756	25 August 1954	TQ 47451 71721	1359435	Stable block to former Foots Cray Place More images
Street wall and gateway to north of Red House	Red House Lane, Bexleyheath	Wall	1859	17 December 1980	TQ 48091 75124	1294702	Street wall and gateway to north of Red House More images
Styleman's Almshouses	13–35 Bexley High Street, Bexley	Houses	1755	1 October 1953	TQ 49351 73602	1064243	Styleman's Almshouses
Tomb of Frances Madocks to south side of Parish Church of St James	North Cray Road, North Cray	Tomb	1790	17 December 1980	TQ 48409 71742	1064239	Tomb of Frances Madocks to south side of Parish Church of St James More images
Tudor Cottages	Foots Cray High Street, Foots Cray	Houses	Late 15th or early 16th century	17 December 1980	TQ 47422 70917	1188354	Tudor Cottages More images
Two chest tombs to east side of Parish Church of St James	North Cray Road, North Cray	Tombs	1728 and 1827	17 December 1980	TQ 48426 71756	1188479	Two chest tombs to east side of Parish Church of St James More images
The x-ray department, formerly the Underground Hospital, Erith and District Hospital	Erith	Hospital	1938	27 November 2003	TQ 50545 77503	1393267	The x-ray department, formerly the Underground Hospital, Erith and District Hospital
Wall fronting grounds formerly belonging to Bexley House (demolished)	Bourne Road, Crayford	Walls	18th century	24 June 1980	TQ 51028 74766	1359382	Wall fronting grounds formerly belonging to Bexley House (demolished)
Walls, gatepiers and gates to south of Frognal House	Frognal Avenue, Sidcup	Walls	Early 18th century	17 December 1980	TQ 46433 70754	1294778	Walls, gatepiers and gates to south of Frognal House
Walls, gate piers and gates to south of stable block at former Foots Cray Place	Rectory Lane, Foots Cray	Walls	18th century	17 December 1980	TQ 47434 71650	1064201	Walls, gate piers and gates to south of stable block at former Foots Cray Place More images
Walls surrounding and to west and south west of Parish Church of St James and gatepiers and gates to west of church	North Cray Road, North Cray	Walls	Mid-18th century	17 December 1980	TQ 48385 71759	1359414	Walls surrounding and to west and south west of Parish Church of St James and gatepiers and gates to west of church More images
Walnut Tree Cottage	164 Sidcup Hill, Foots Cray	House	Early 17th century	13 October 1986	TQ 47230 71071	1064212	Walnut Tree Cottage More images
Whitehill House	1 Crayford Road, Crayford	House	Late 18th–early 19th century	20 May 1952	TQ 52336 74483	1064224	Whitehill House
Workshop range to south east of Main Engine House	Belvedere Road, Belvedere	Industrial building	May 1865	3 January 1990	TQ 48528 81013	1064216	Workshop range to south east of Main Engine House More images
Workshop range to south west of Main Engine House	Belvedere Road, Belvedere	Industrial building	May 1865	3 January 1990	TQ 48423 81072	1250557	Workshop range to south west of Main Engine House More images
World War II heavy anti-aircraft (HAA) battery	Wallhouse Road, Slade Green	Battery	Late 1930s	2 December 2009	TQ 52978 77464	1393580	World War II heavy anti-aircraft (HAA) battery More images
Wye Lodge	80 Lion Road, Bexleyheath	House	17th century	17 December 1980	TQ 48505 74932	1064231	Wye Lodge

== Parks and gardens ==
Name	Location	Type	Completed	Date designated	Grid ref. Geo-coordinates	Entry number	Image
Danson Park	Danson Road, Bexleyheath	Park and garden	18th century	1 October 1987	TQ4710575029	1000211	Danson Park More images
Foots Cray Place	Foots Cray Meadows, North Cray Road, Sidcup	Park and garden	Mid-18th century	27 September 1988	TQ4740971818	1000288	Foots Cray Place More images
Hall Place	Bourne Road, Bexley	Park and garden	Early 20th century	1 October 1987	TQ 50240 74176	1000247	Hall Place More images
Lamorbey Park (Note: This listing is for Lamorbey Park; the mansion on the grounds, Lamorbey House, is also listed as Lamorbey Park.)	Burnt Oak Lane, Sidcup	Park and garden	Mid-18th century	7 December 1988	TQ4669873240	1000289	Lamorbey Park (Note: This listing is for Lamorbey Park; the mansion on the grounds, Lamorbey House, is also listed as Lamorbey Park.) More images

== See also ==
- Grade I and II* listed buildings in the London Borough of Bexley
- Grade II listed buildings in London
- List of sites on the National Register of Historic Parks and Gardens
