= Lamorbey =

Coordinates: 51.438°N 0.108°E

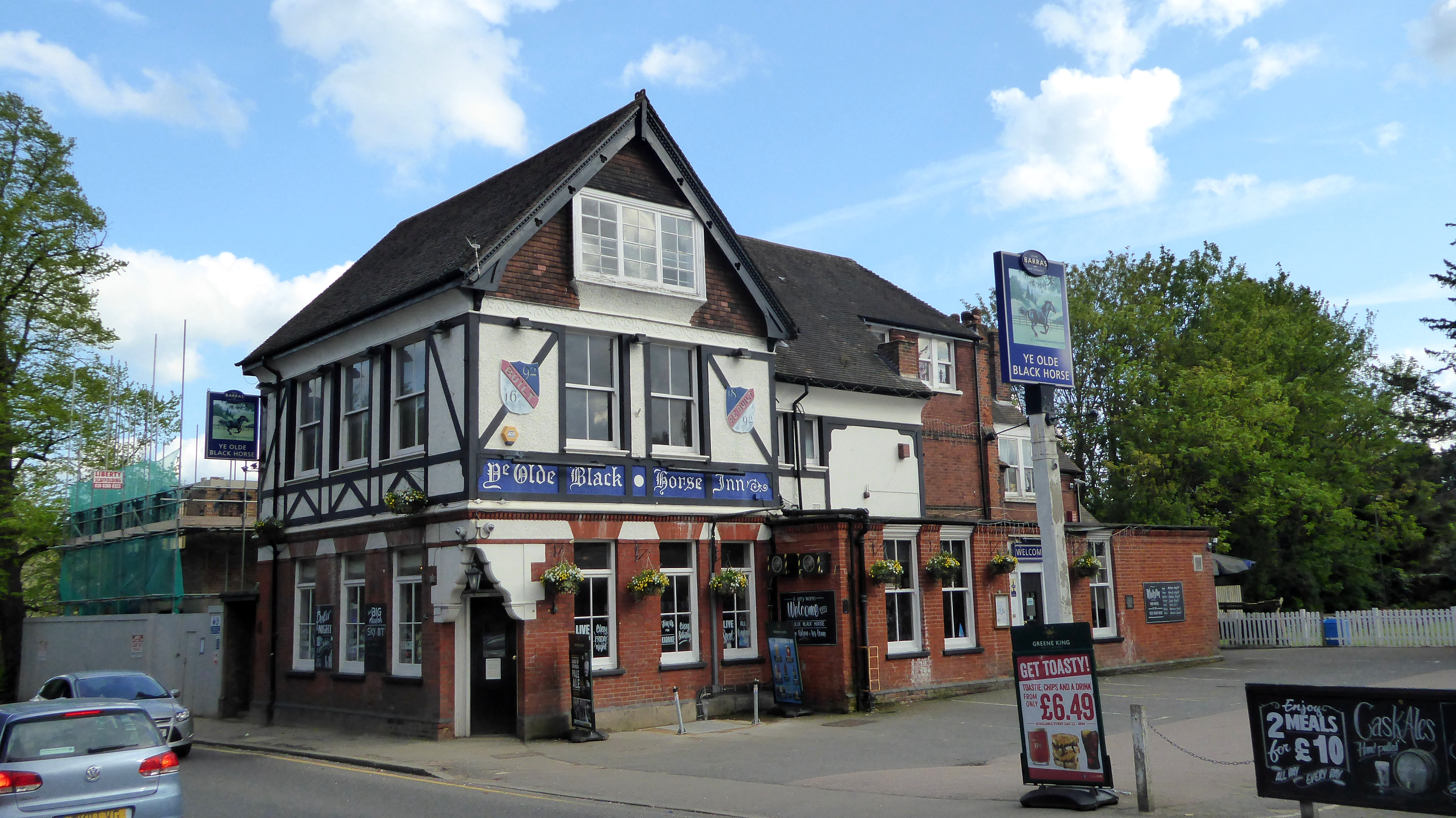
- Ye Olde Black Horse pub

- Location within Greater London
- London borough: Bexley
- Ceremonial county: Greater London
- Region: London
- Country: England
- Sovereign state: United Kingdom
- Post town: SIDCUP
- Postcode district: DA15
- Dialling code: 020
- Police: Metropolitan
- Fire: London
- Ambulance: London
- UK Parliament: Old Bexley and Sidcup
- London Assembly: Bexley and Bromley

Lamorbey is a village in southeast London in the London Borough of Bexley, to the north of Sidcup. It borders the Royal Borough of Greenwich. Significant buildings in the area are Holy Trinity Church, Lamorbey House and some of the original surviving buildings of The Hollies children's home (now converted to residential use). The oldest house in Sidcup, dating from 1452, can also be found in the district.

The principal road becomes Halfway Street and is flanked by old cottages and Ye Olde Black Horse pub, established in 1743, though rebuilt in 1892. Lamorbey House, a listed building in a well maintained public park, houses Rose Bruford College. Lamorbey Park, adjacent to the house, has large ponds where fishing continues. Sidcup Golf Course is to its east, as are Hurstmere School and Chislehurst and Sidcup Grammar School, whose pupils wear distinctive purple blazers.

Holy Trinity Church was designed in the Victorian Gothic style by Ewan Christian and completed in 1879, although the planned tower was never built.

Much of the district is typical suburbia, mainly built in the 1930s. Prior to that much of the land was used for the growing of hops—wild hops may still be found growing on the Old Farm Avenue allotments. Some farm buildings were next to Sidcup sorting office and included characteristic Kentish oast houses.

Other landmarks are the clock house, pool and the former administrative block of The Hollies children's home (1901–1983) which is now at the heart of an up-market housing estate.

== Transport ==
=== Rail ===
The closest National Rail station is Sidcup with services to London Charing Cross, London Cannon Street via Lewisham, London Cannon Street via Woolwich Arsenal and to Gravesend.

=== Buses ===
Lamorbey is served by three Transport for London bus routes 51, 229 and 286.

== Politics and government ==
Lamorbey is part of the Old Bexley and Sidcup constituency for elections to the House of Commons of the United Kingdom, currently represented by Louie French from the Conservative Party.

Lamorbey is part of the Blackfen and Lamorbey ward for elections to London Borough of Bexley.

== Gallery ==
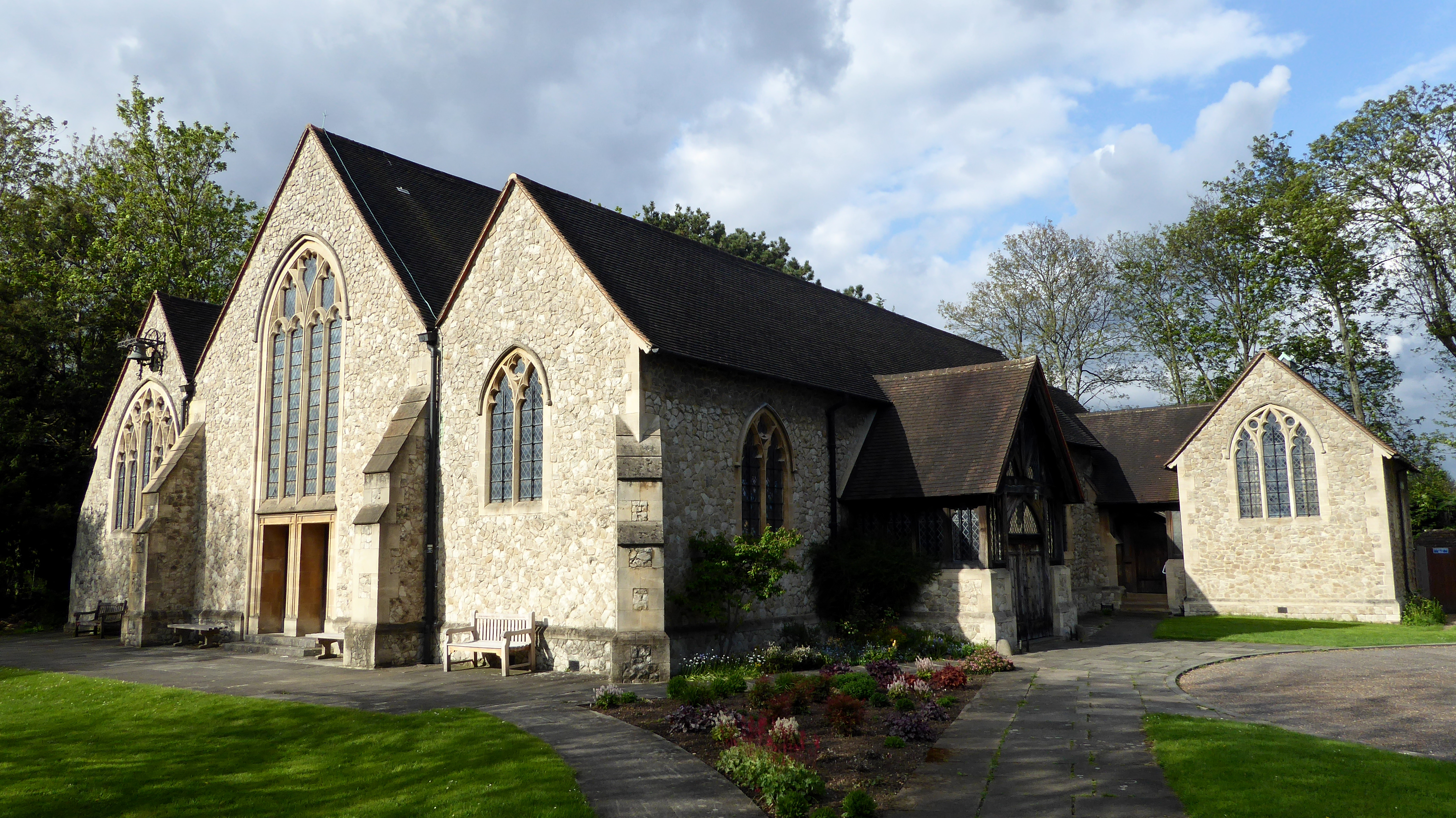
Holy Trinity Church

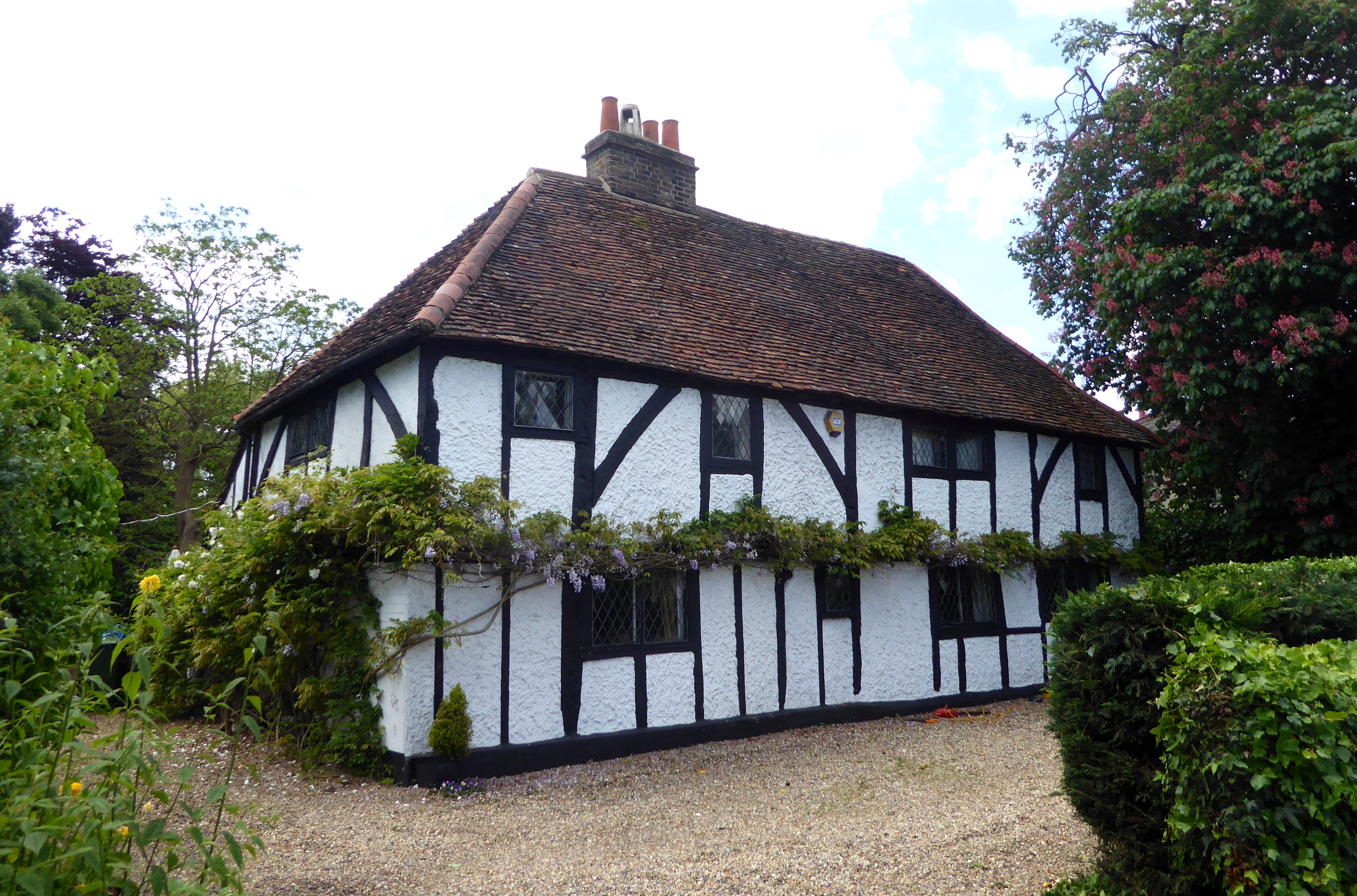
27 Halfway Street, a Grade II listed building constructed in the early modern period

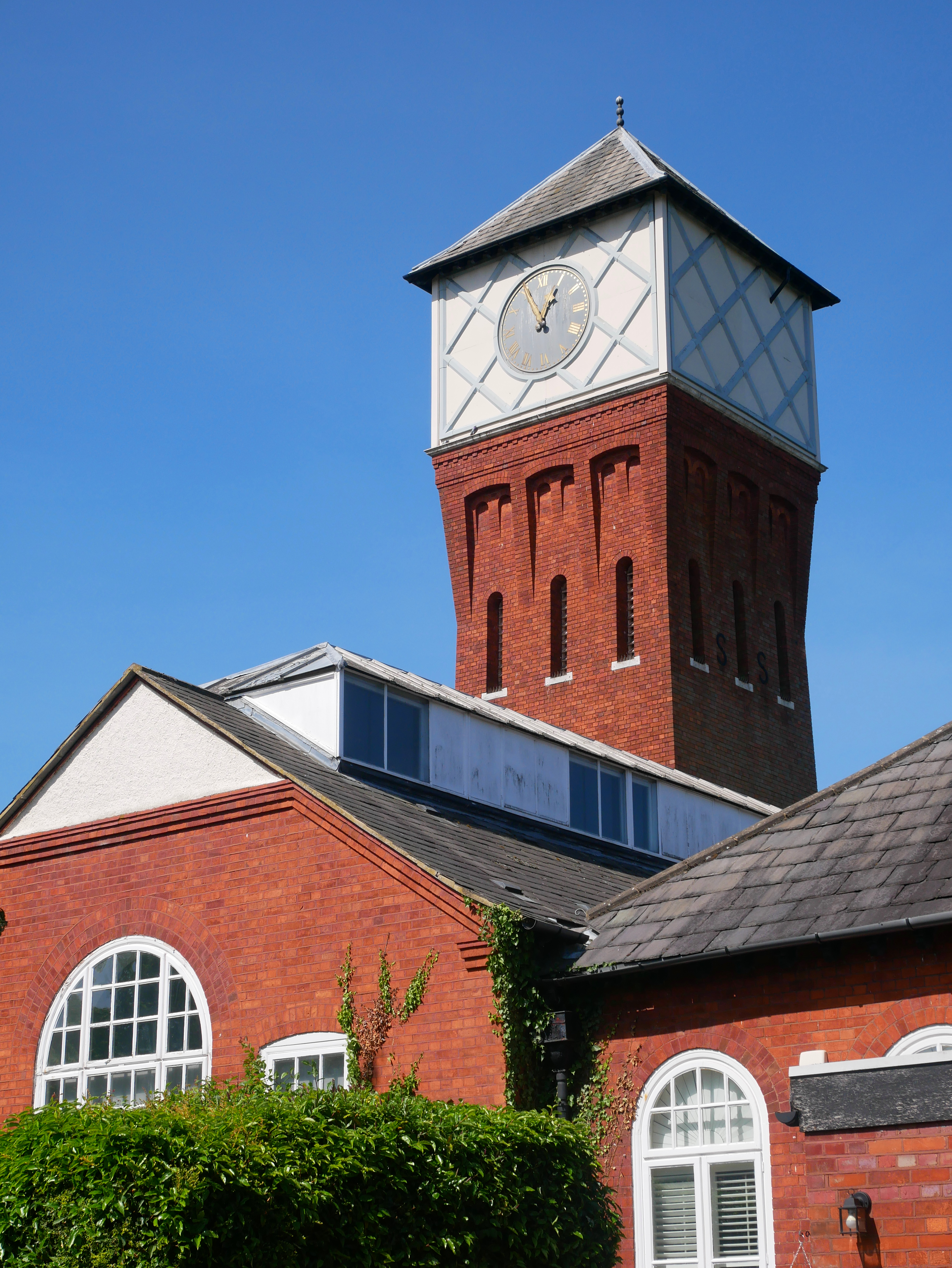
The Clockhouse in the Hollies housing estate
