= Grade I and II* listed buildings in the London Borough of Bexley =

There are over 9,000 Grade I listed buildings and 20,000 Grade II* listed buildings in England. This page is a list of these buildings in the London Borough of Bexley.

See also the list of Grade II listed buildings in the London Borough of Bexley.

== Grade I ==
Name	Location	Type	Completed (Note: The date given is the date used by Historic England as significant for the initial building or that of an important part in the structure's description.)	Date designated	Grid ref. (Note: Sometimes known as OSGB36, the grid reference is based on the British national grid reference system used by the Ordnance Survey.) Geo-coordinates	Entry number (Note: The "List Entry Number" is a unique number assigned to each listed building and scheduled monument by Historic England.)	Image
Crossness Pumping Station	Belvedere	Pumping station	1865	24 June 1970	TQ4849781080; 51°30′33″N 0°08′18″E	1064241	Crossness Pumping Station More images
Danson House	Welling	House	c.1765	1 October 1953	TQ4727375179; 51°27′23″N 0°07′06″E	1064225	Danson House More images
Hall Place	Bexley	House	16th century	1 October 1953	TQ5014574318; 51°26′53″N 0°09′33″E	1188277	Hall Place More images
Hall Place Garden wall, gatepiers and gates	Bexley	Gate	18th century	1 October 1953	TQ5012174371; 51°26′54″N 0°09′32″E	1064250	Hall Place Garden wall, gatepiers and gates More images
Red House	Bexleyheath	House	1859	25 May 1950	TQ4810675093; 51°27′20″N 0°07′49″E	1064203	Red House More images
Well head to south-east of Red House	Bexleyheath	Well head	1859	1 October 1953	TQ4811575091; 51°27′20″N 0°07′49″E	1359397	Well head to south-east of Red House More images

== Grade II* ==
Name	Location	Type	Completed	Date designated	Grid ref. Geo-coordinates	Entry number	Image
Bath house to rear of Number 112	Bexley	Bath house	c.1766	17 December 1980	TQ4940073100; 51°26′14″N 0°08′53″E	1064236	Upload Photo
Christ Church	Erith	Church	1874	17 December 1980	TQ5124677889; 51°28′47″N 0°10′36″E	1188549	Christ Church More images
Frognal House	Bexley	Country house	17th century	30 May 1978	TQ4647070837; 51°25′03″N 0°06′18″E	1064228	Frognal House More images
Greek Orthodox Church	Welling	Parish church	12th century	1 October 1953	TQ4677576947; 51°28′21″N 0°06′43″E	1188567	Greek Orthodox Church More images
Parish Church of All Saints	Foots Cray	Parish church	c.1863	25 August 1954	TQ4757971293; 51°25′17″N 0°07′16″E	1064202	Parish Church of All Saints More images
Parish Church of St John the Baptist	Erith	Lych gate	12th century	20 May 1953	TQ5076378725; 51°29′15″N 0°10′12″E	1188560	Parish Church of St John the Baptist More images
Parish Church of St Mary the Virgin	Bexley	Parish church	13th century or earlier	1 October 1953	TQ4978573444; 51°26′25″N 0°09′13″E	1294750	Parish Church of St Mary the Virgin More images
Parish Church of St Paulinus	Crayford	Parish church	c.1100	20 May 1952	TQ5119475122; 51°27′18″N 0°10′29″E	1359434	Parish Church of St Paulinus More images
Stables to Danson Park	Welling	Stable	c.1765	1 October 1953	TQ4721775348; 51°27′29″N 0°07′03″E	1359409	Stables to Danson Park More images

== See also ==
- Listed buildings in England
