= John Styleman =

British East India Company merchant (1652-1734)

John Styleman (1652-1734) was a British East India Company merchant and administrator in Java and India, and later a director of the company.

== Life and career ==
=== With the East India Company ===
Styleman joined the East India Company as a young man. Arriving in India in about 1684, he served as member of the council of the Governor of Madras from 1694 to 1699, and as mayor of Madras from 1692 to 1695. On his return to Britain he became a director of the company and owned £2,000 of shares.

=== On return to England ===
In 1697 his brother Francis acquired Danson Park and estate in Bexleyheath, Kent on his behalf, as well as 12 acres of marshland in Plumstead. Styleman began to develop Danson Park as a country seat, but his second wife Arabella died there in 1717, and he left the estate in 1723, letting it to John Selwyn MP on a 99-year lease.

Styleman died in 1734. His will stipulated that proceeds from the lease of his property go towards supporting his fifth wife, Mary, and then at her death, half of the proceeds should go to building almshouses for the poor in Bexley. In 1761 the new owner of half of the estate, Sir John Boyd, attempted to acquire the half of the property willed to the charity in Styleman's will, by way of a permanent annuity of £100, but an act of Parliament was required to facilitate this arrangement. This resulted in the Styleman Act 1762 (2 Geo. 3. c. 35 Pr.).

=== Personal life ===
He was married five times and had five children with his first wife Elizabeth. He died at his house in Charterhouse Square, and was buried at Bexley with all his wives except Elizabeth.
