= Lamorbey Park =

House in Bexley, London, England

Coordinates: 51.4383°N 0.1078°E

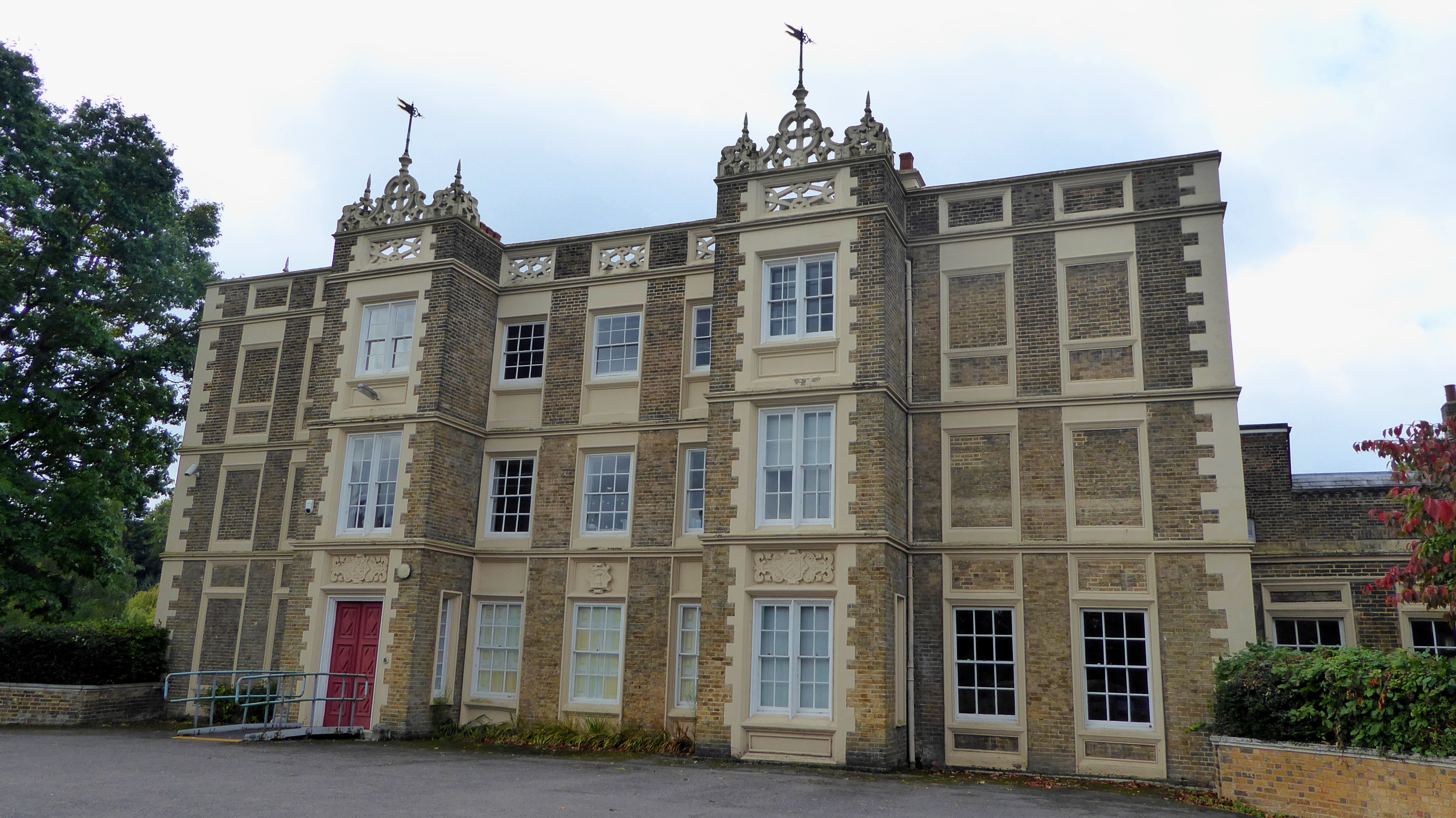
Lamorbey House from the front

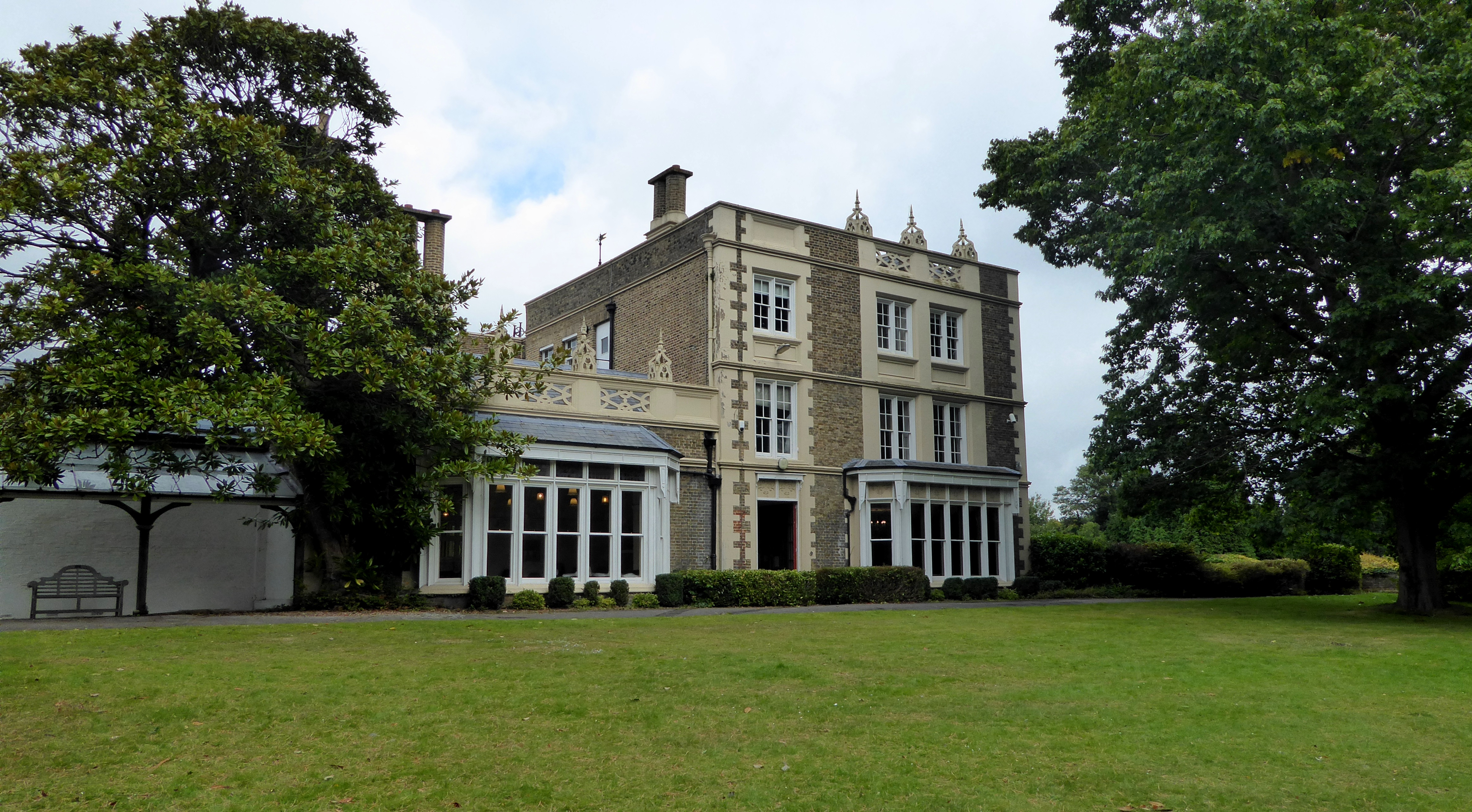
As seen from the right of the building

Lamorbey Park is a 57-hectare (140-acre) park in Lamorbey, in the London Borough of Bexley, set around a Grade II listed mansion, Lamorbey House. The original 17th century estate consisted of 119 hectares, but over time sections of the estate have been separated for other uses, including two secondary schools (Chislehurst and Sidcup Grammar School and Hurstmere School), Rose Bruford College, and Sidcup Golf Club. The area of the park still in public ownership includes The Glade, a 7.4-hectare (18-acre) area of historic landscape laid in the 1920s with a large lake. The park was added to the Register of Historic Parks and Gardens of special historic interest in 1988.

== History ==
The earliest recorded owner of the estate was Thomas Sparrow, a reeve, in 1495. He died in 1513, and his daughter Agnes and her husband James Goldwell built the first house there, probably a timber house with later brick wings added. The Goldwell family sold the estate in the late 17th century, and the house and estate had several different owners, including Charles FitzRoy, the son of Charles II.

The 119-hectare (290-acre) Lamorbey (or Lamaby) Estate was bought by William Steele, a director of the East India Company, in 1744. He had the 17th century mansion rebuilt, and formally laid out the estate's land to the north, east and south as a park. When he died in 1748 the property was split between his daughters, and in 1761 it was divided into two parts when sold to different owners. In 1783 the property was reunited when both parts were bought by David Orme, a Scottish doctor. Orme made a number of alterations to the property, including re-routing the driveway. Orme died in 1812 and the property passed into another branch of his family, the Malcolms, who had made their money from sugar plantations in Jamaica.

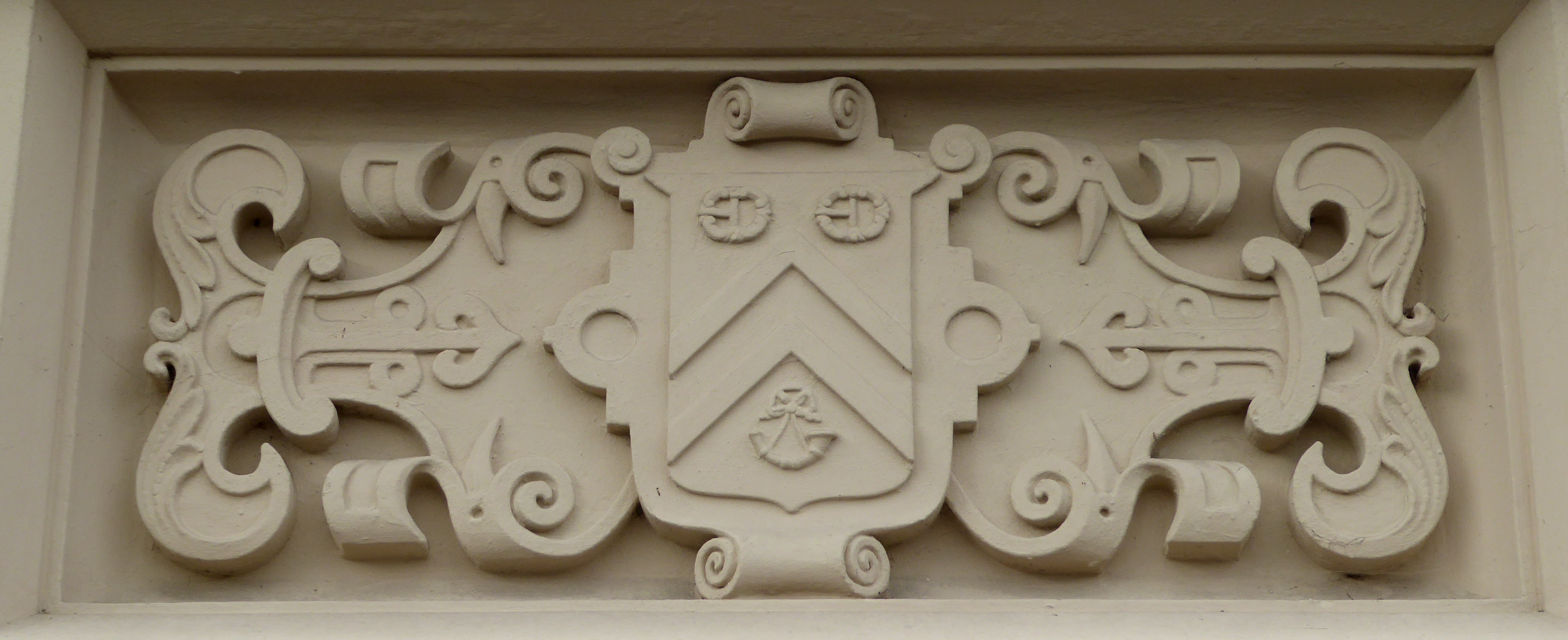
External detail on the house

In the 1830s Orme's grandson, Neil Malcolm, commissioned John Shaw to redesign aspects of the mansion, including a Jacobean facade and the removal of several interior walls, and he also added an orangery. The house subsequently passed to his brother, John Neil Malcolm, in 1840 and was partly remodelled by Sir James Pennethorne. From the 1860s the property was tenanted, and in 1910 the private residence was converted into a hotel, initially known as the Lamorbey Park Residential Hotel. Around this time Sidcup Golf Club leased part of the grounds for a golf course, possibly designed by James Braid. In 1926 a consortium, led by Greenwich businessman Herbert John Sheppard, took over the hotel, and Sheppard oversaw the establishment of pleasure grounds within the estate, including a bowling green, tennis courts, and substantial new areas of plantation known as The Glade and Pine Tree Walk, as well as a new entrance to the grounds from the western side. Bathing in the lakes was also encouraged.

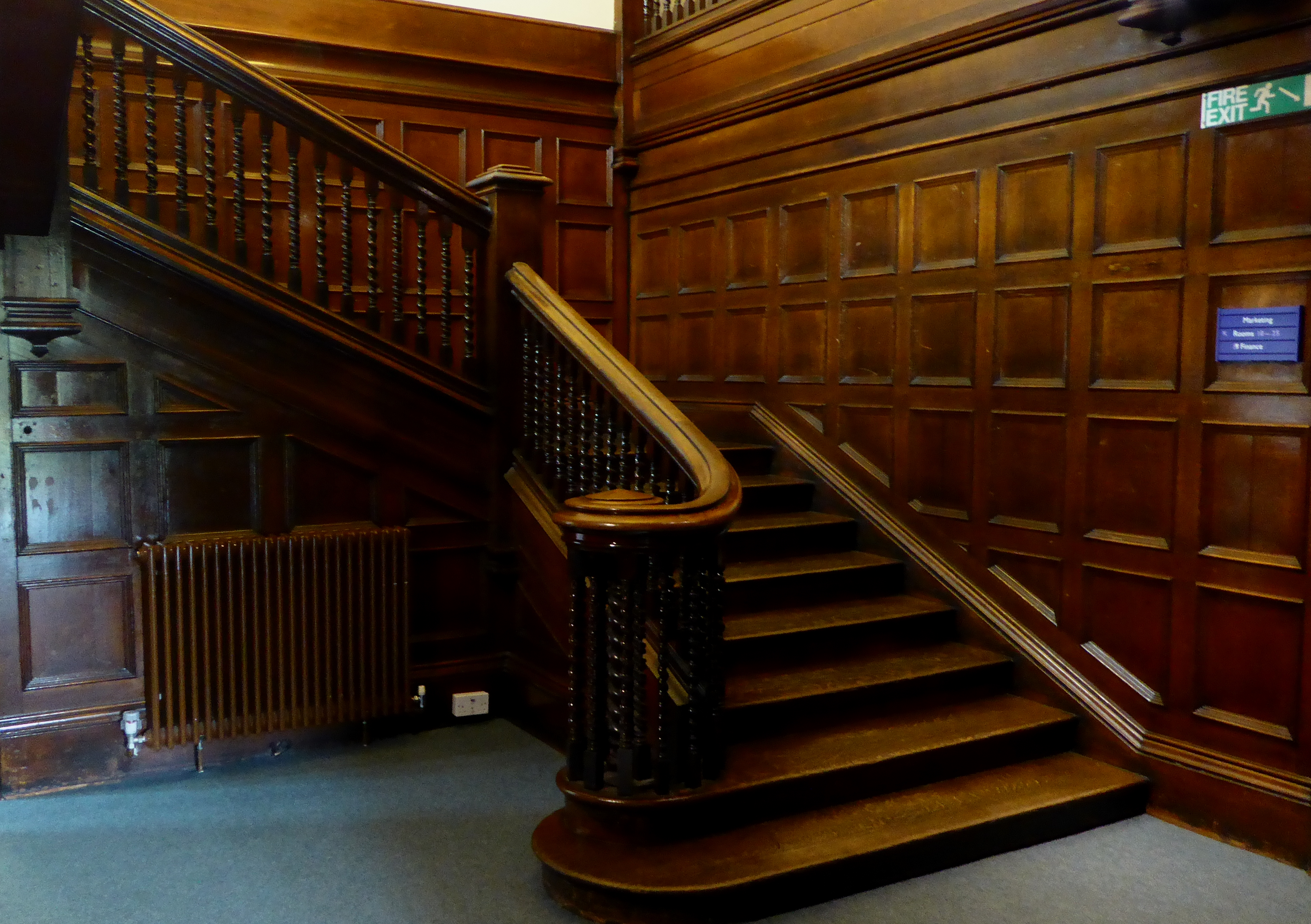
Staircase in the house

In 1933, during the rapid development of the area, the north-east part of the park was sold to New Ideal Homesteads as residential land, and became part of the Penhill Park Estate. In 1946 the Kent Education Centre bought the mansion, opening an adult education centre the following year. From 1950 use of the mansion and surrounding gardens was shared with Rose Bruford College, a drama school, which has used the premises ever since. The golf course was reduced from 18 to 9 holes, and two secondary schools were built, one to house the relocated Chislehurst and Sidcup Grammar School (from 1954) and one the newly-established Hurstmere School. The remainder of the grounds, consisting of The Glade, The Dell, and Pine Tree Walk, continued as a public park. The Glade, a 7.4-hectare (18-acre) area of historic landscape laid in the 1920s, features a large lake that houses the Lamorbey Angling Society.

== Historic parks register ==
The park was added to the Register of Historic Parks and Gardens of special historic interest on 7 December 1988, listed Grade II.
