= Sir John Boyd, 2nd Baronet =

Sir John Boyd, 2nd Baronet (1750–1815) was an English politician, Member of Parliament for Wareham from 1780 to 1784.

He was the son of John Boyd, 1st Baronet Boyd, and his first wife Mary Bumpstead or Bamstead, daughter of William Bamstead of Upton, Warwickshire. He matriculated at Christ Church, Oxford in 1768, graduating M.A. in 1772.

On his father's death in 1800, Boyd inherited his estate (except for annuities to John's stepmother, sisters and stepsisters, and a sum of £3000 cash and the deceased's personal effects, again to his stepmother) and his father's title. He auctioned off his father's large collection of paintings and drawings, demolished the imposing kitchen and stable wings at his father's new country house of Danson, and built the house's present stable block, before selling the estate in 1807.

== Notes ==
Parliament of Great Britain
Preceded by William Gerard Hamilton	Member of Parliament for Wareham; 1780–1784	Succeeded by Charles Lefebure
Baronetage of Great Britain
Preceded by John Boyd	Baronet (of Danson); 1800 – 1815	Succeeded by John Boyd
