= Danson Park =

Coordinates: 51.45665°N 0.11729°E

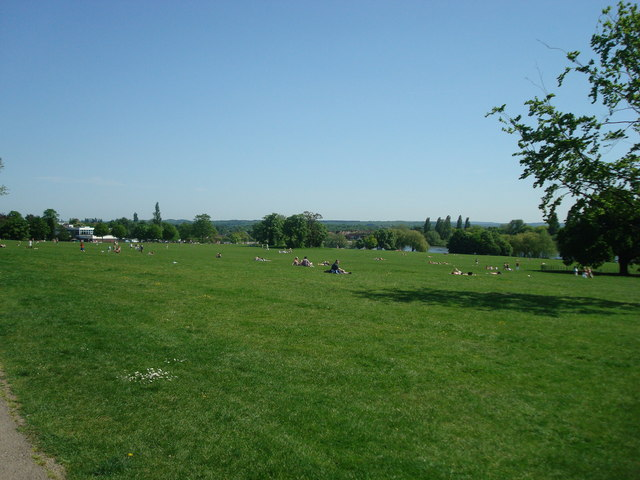
- Danson Park
- Interactive map of Danson Park
- Location: London Borough of Bexley
- Opened: 1925
- Operator: Bexley Council
- Public transit: Bexleyheath; Welling

Listed Building – Grade II
- Designated: 1 October 1987
- Reference no.: 1000211

Danson Park is a public park in the London Borough of Bexley, South East London, located between Welling and Bexleyheath. At 75 hectares, it is the second largest public park in the borough (the largest being Foots Cray Meadows at 100 hectares), and the most used by the community. Opened in 1925, it is often considered the finest green open space in the borough, and is Grade II listed on the Register of Historic Parks and Gardens. The park also gives its name to the electoral ward that covers the park and the surrounding area. The park is located at grid reference TQ472752. The southern boundary of both the park and the ward is delineated by Rochester Way, the A2 road.

== History ==
The area now occupied by the park had previously been part of the church and then crown estates, before being occupied by John Styleman and then Sir John Boyd, 1st Baronet, both senior figures in the British East India Company. In the 1760s, Boyd built Danson House, a Grade I-listed Georgian mansion that stands in the centre of the park, and commissioned much of the landscaping that can be seen in the park today. The landscape was designed and laid out between 1761 and 1763, by either Capability Brown or his assistant Nathaniel Richmond. At its centre is a large and picturesque 12-acre (49,000 m^{2}) lake, described by Edward Hasted in his History and Topographical Survey of the County of Kent of 1797 as "a most magnificent sheet of water so contrived as to seem a beautiful serpentine river, flowing through the grounds". A small house with a spire, named Chapel House, was constructed to the south of the lake, which is now separated from the rest of the park by a motorway, but can still be seen today near the roundabout at Blendon. By the time of Boyd's death the Danson Estates comprised over 600 acres (2.4 km^{2}) of pleasure grounds and agricultural estate.

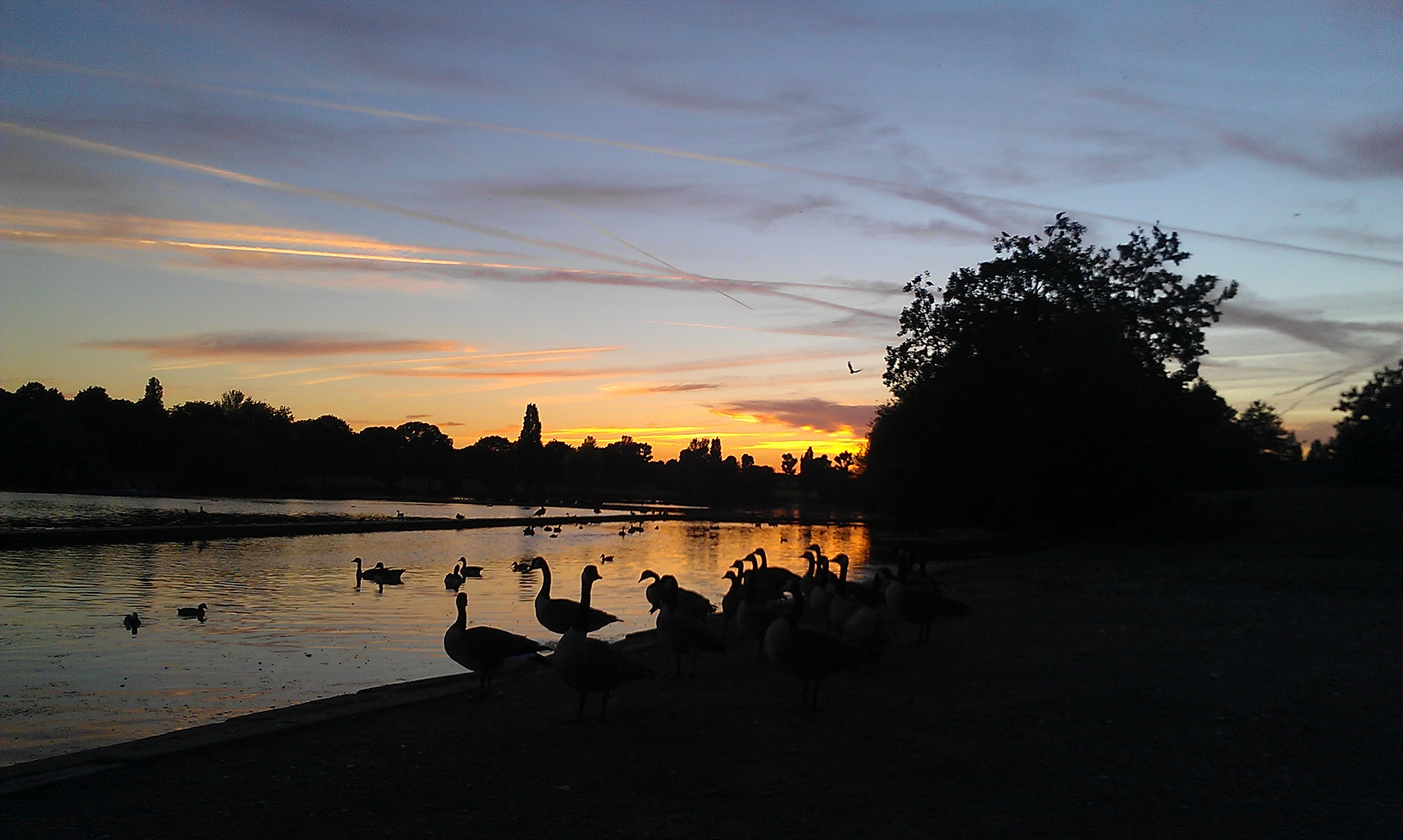
Danson Lake, a prominent feature of the park.

In 1773, a mock ancient Greek temple was built near to the lake by Sir William Chambers. This was disassembled and moved to the gardens of St Paul's Walden Bury in Hertfordshire in 1961, and is today a grade II listed building. There was also a statue of the Roman goddess Diana in the park.

The other key previous occupant of the estates was Alfred Bean, a railway engineer who bought the property in 1862. Bean was the driving force behind the Bexleyheath Railway Company, and chairman of Bexley Local Board, and envisaged transforming the now 582-acre (2.4 km^{2}) estate into a residential suburb. Outlying areas were sold off for residential development according to Bean's will, but the house and 224 acres of the estate remained in Bean's family after his death in 1890. The estate was auctioned in 1921 on the death of his widow, and eventually acquired by Bexley Urban District Council (UDC) for £16,000 in 1924. The council spent another £3,500 converting the estate into a public park.

The park was opened to the public in 1925 by Princess Mary, Land was reserved for football pitches, tennis courts and a bowling green, which have been added over time. In 1929 the Morris Wheeler Gates were erected at the north-east corner of the park, donated by Alfred Morris Wheeler, a prominent local businessman and chairman of Bexley UDC. An open-air swimming pool opened in 1936, and in 1964 the Boathouse and Cafe opened to the public. The park grounds were restored, funded by the Heritage Lottery Fund, in 2006, alongside a major English Heritage restoration of Danson House. The park is now used extensively by the community.

== Features of the park ==
The one hectare Danson Park Bog Garden is a Local Nature Reserve. There are also three gardens open to the public: the English Garden, located over the road from Danson House; the Rock Garden, at the western end of the park; and the Peace Garden in the south-eastern corner.

On 30 September 1937, Lord Cornwallis presented the charter re-designating Bexley from an Urban District Council to a municipal borough under the large oak tree in the centre of Danson Park. The oak tree, which is over 200 years old, has since been known as "Charter Oak", and has been recognised as one of the Great Trees of London. It is a central feature of the park, and is also featured on the London Borough of Bexley coat of arms. The tree is now enclosed to protect its root system.

The park regularly hosts circuses, fun-fairs, firework displays, and various other large public events. A free 5k run, part of the international parkrun events, takes place every Saturday morning at 9.00am on a two-lap scenic course around Danson Lake. Sports facilities in the park include football pitches, hard-surface tennis courts, bowling greens, obstacle courses, an outdoor gym and cycle routes, as well as a popular children's playground with a small water park. Boating, sailing and rowing are possible on the lake, also used by various water-sports clubs and societies.

The park contains the Danson Stables, a public house in a building previously used as the stable block for Danson House, and The Boathouse, a function suite and restaurant near the lake.

== Danson Festival ==
Until 2013 the park played host to the Danson Festival, an annual large-scale two-day event run by Bexley Council, which attracted up to 60,000 visitors to the park. The festival included many stalls such as arts, crafts, charities and others, as well as a fun fair with various rides. The festival usually ran on the first weekend of July each year. The main focal point of the festival was the main stage on which various local artists performed, alongside established acts. Past festivals featured performances from artists including The Hoosiers, The AllStars with Jocelyn Brown, Alexander O'Neal, X-factor's Rowetta, and Peter Andre and Katie Price.

In 2014 the festival was cancelled due to poor condition of the grounds. The council cancelled the festival again in 2015 for the same reason, with the suggestion that the measure could be permanent, and the festival has not taken place since.

== Local government ward ==
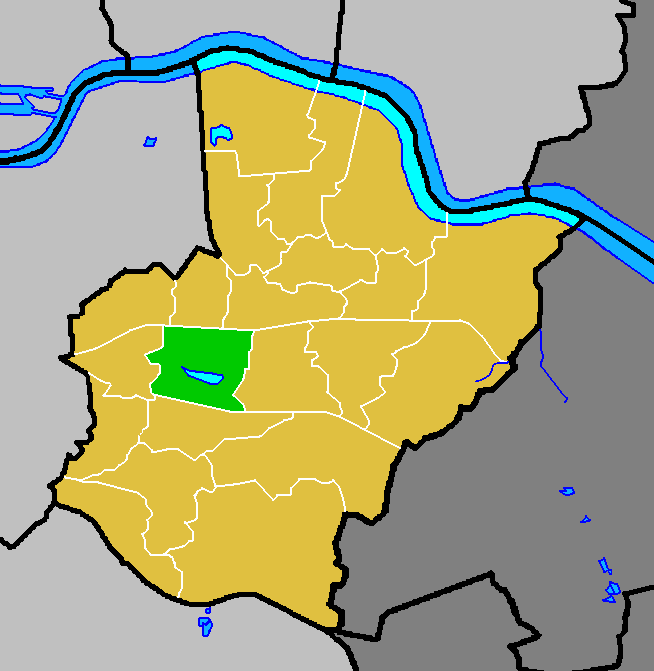
Danson Park ward (green) within the London Borough of Bexley (yellow)

Danson Park was a ward of the London Borough of Bexley. The population of this ward at the 2011 Census was 10,864. In the council elections of 2014, Danson Park ward returned Linda Bailey, Sharon Massey and John Waters as councillors, all from the Conservative Party. In 2017 the Danson Park ward was abolished, and the park is now in the Falconwood and Welling ward.
