= Danson House =

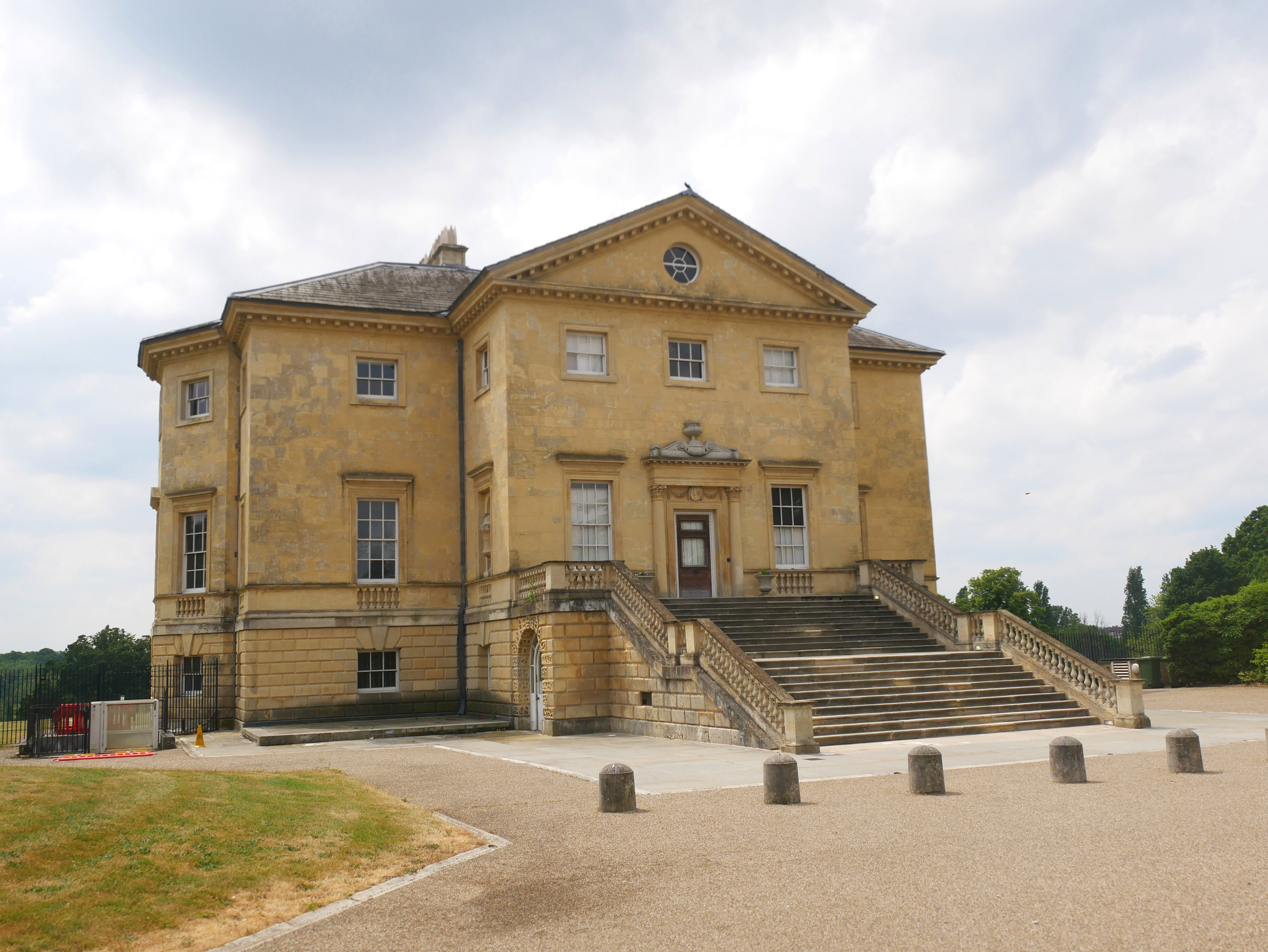
- The north face of Danson House, Bexley

- Location within London Borough of Bexley
- 51°27′23.24″N 00°07′06.00″E
- Type: Mansion
- Location: Welling
- OS grid reference: TQ 47273 75179

History
- Built: 1768

Site notes
- Area: London Borough of Bexley
- Architect: Robert Taylor
- Architectural style: Palladian
- Owner: English Heritage

Listed Building – Grade I
- Official name: Danson Park Mansion
- Designated: 1 October 1953
- Reference no.: 1064225

National Register of Historic Parks and Gardens
- Official name: Danson Park
- Designated: 1 October 1987
- Reference no.: 1000211

Danson House is a Palladian mansion and a Grade I listed building at the centre of Danson Park, in Welling in the London Borough of Bexley, south-east London.

== History ==
=== The Danson estates before Danson House ===
The earliest reference to the Danson estates can be found in an Archbishop's survey of 1284, in which seven of the Archbishop's tenants are cited as owning 17 acres of land at "Densynton". The Manor of Bexley was acquired by Henry VIII, and remained a part of the royal estates until James I sold it to John Spielman in an attempt to raise funds for the crown. On 1 March 1622 the Manor was bought by William Camden, who immediately granted it to Oxford University to fund a chair in History. In 1695 the estates were sold into private hands for the first time as an owner-occupied property.

In 1699 John Styleman, a director of the British East India Company, took up residence at Danson, the estates having been acquired on his behalf by his brother Francis two years earlier. Styleman began to develop the estates as a country seat, but left Danson shortly after the death of his wife Arabella at the property in 1717. In 1723 Styleman leased the property for 99 years to John Selwyn MP, a royal courtier, who improved and enlarged the estates a great deal before his death in 1751. The estate at this point included a mansion with five bedrooms, four living rooms, a nursery, kitchen and brewhouse, as well as an icehouse, elaborate water features, and an ornamental Chinese-style house.

=== 1753–1800 ===
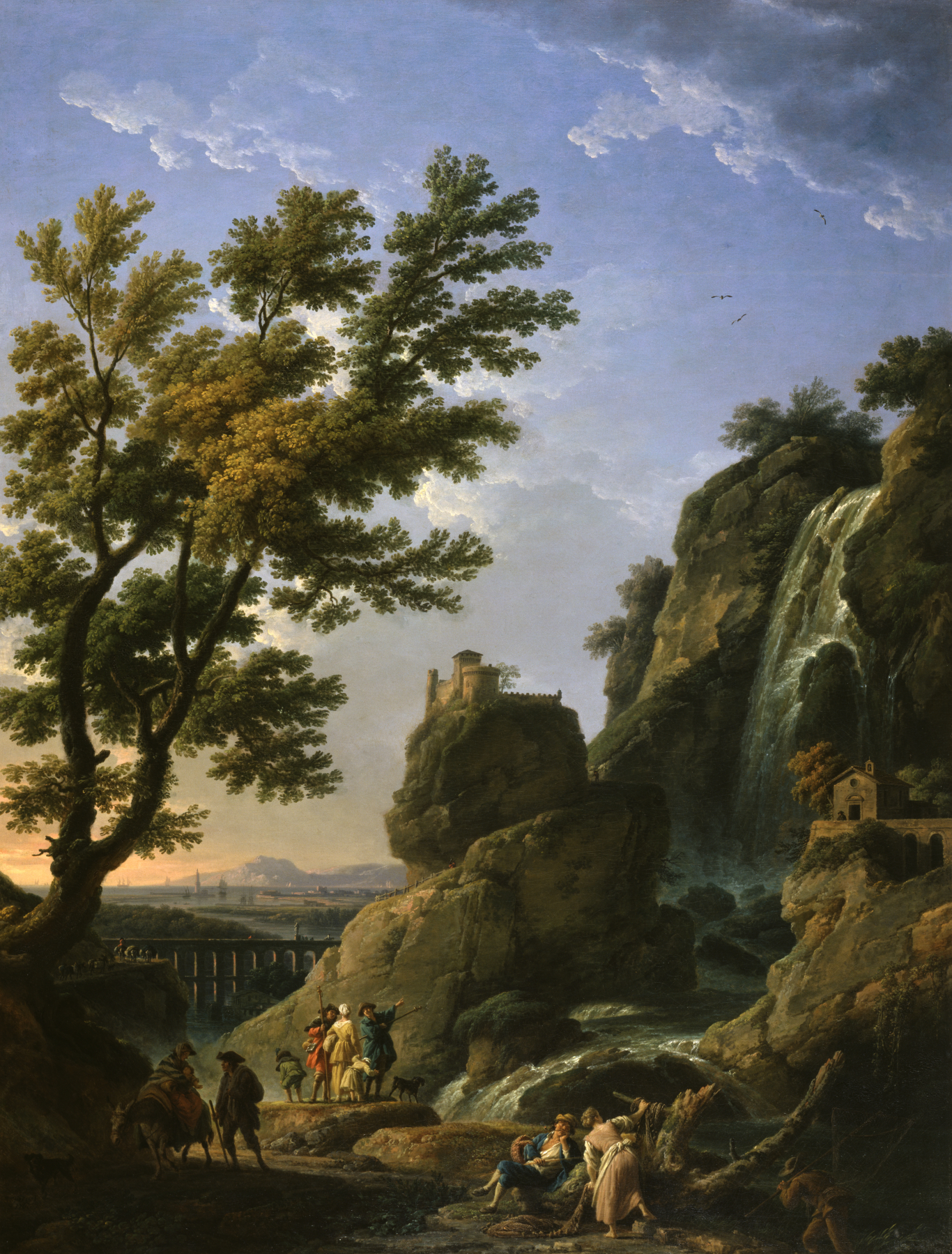
This painting, by Claude-Joseph Vernet, was commissioned for Danson House. The Walters Art Museum, Baltimore

John Styleman had died in 1734, his will stipulating that half the proceeds from the lease should go to his widow, Mary Styleman, and the other half to charities providing almhouses for 12 poor families in Bexley. On 10 July 1753 Selwyn's widow, also Mary, sub-let the property to Sir John Boyd, sugar merchant and vice-chairman of the British East India Company, and son of the St Kitts planter and slaveholder Augustus Boyd. By 1759 Boyd had taken over the lease and bought out the rest of the land added to the estates by Selwyn. However, he still had to pay £100 annuity to the charity established by Styleman's will, which owned half of the freehold. His offer of a permanent annuity in return for the charity's half of the freehold required an Act of Parliament, and as a result the Styleman Act was passed in 1762, and John Boyd thus became the sole owner of the entire estates, paving the way for extensive enlargement of the property and the construction of Danson House as it stands today.

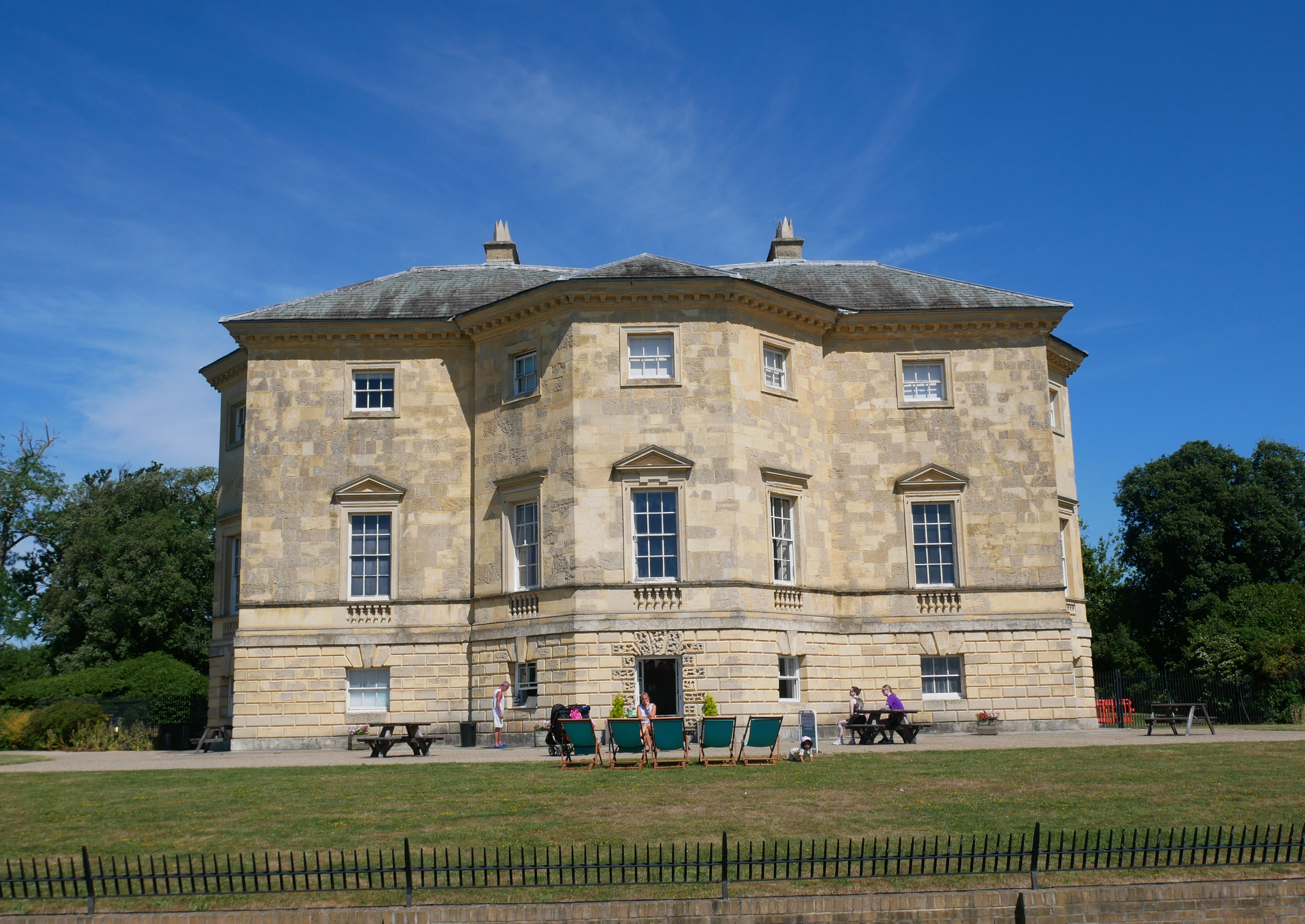
The south face of Danson House

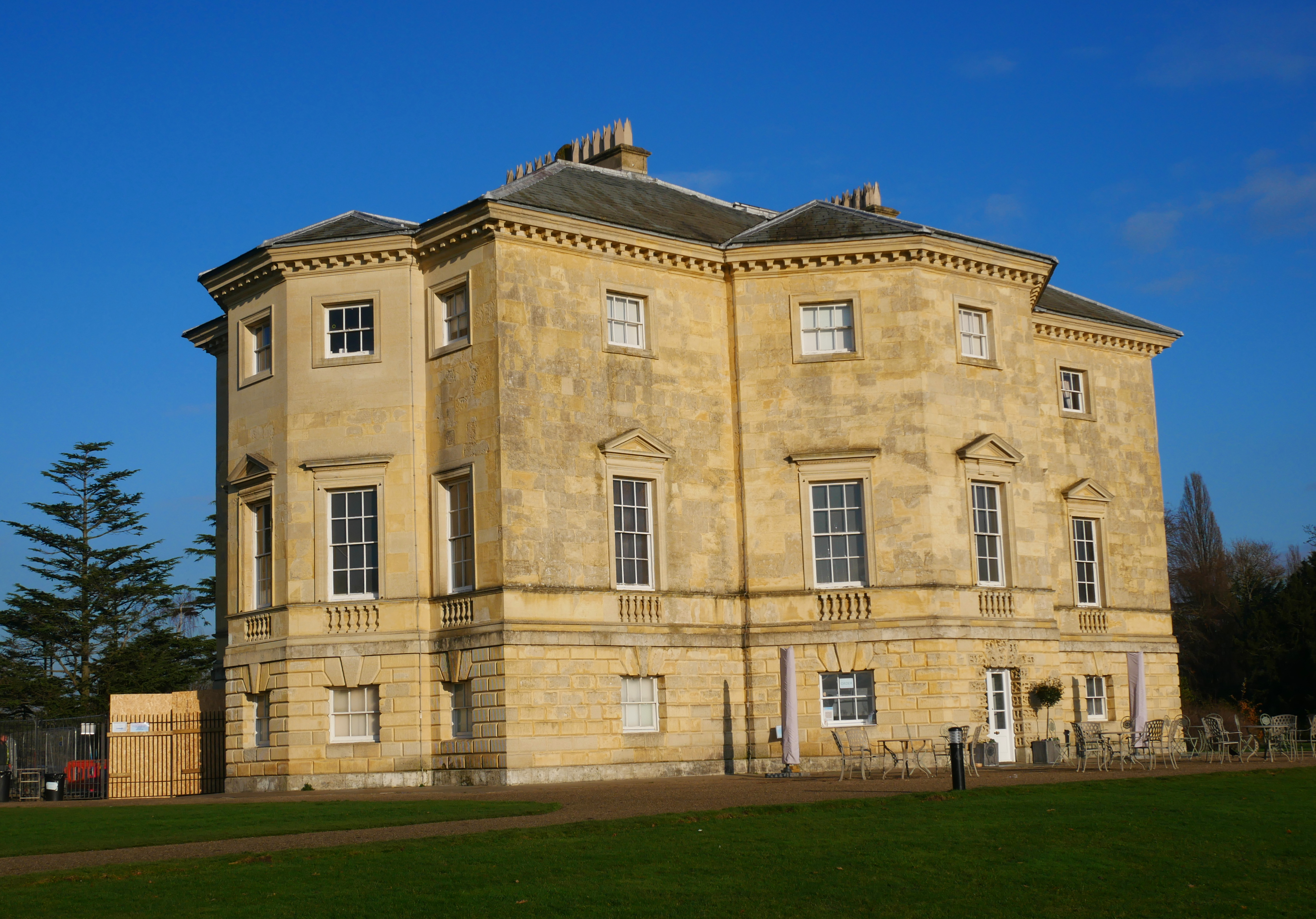
View of Danson House from the southwest

Originally called Danson Hill, the Palladian villa was designed by leading architect Sir Robert Taylor (architect of the Bank of England), and constructed to the north of the older mansion. Work began on the house in 1763, and Boyd moved into the house around 1768 with his new wife Catherine. By the time of Boyd's death in 1800 it stood in the centre of over 600 acres (2.4 km^{2}) of pleasure grounds and agricultural estate – over 200 acres (0.8 km^{2}) of which today form Danson Park, the second largest public park in the London Borough of Bexley. Internal furnishings and decorations, including ornate chimney-pieces, were designed by William Chambers, a friend of Boyd's, and murals and paintings were produced for the house by artists such as Richard Wilson and Richard Corbould.

The landscape was designed and laid out from 1761 to 1763, by either Capability Brown or his assistant Nathaniel Richmond. At its centre is a large and picturesque 12-acre (49,000 m^{2}) lake to the south of the house, on the site of the previous mansion, described by Edward Hasted in his History and Topographical Survey of the County of Kent of 1797 as "a most magnificent sheet of water so contrived as to seem a beautiful serpentine river, flowing through the grounds". A small house with a spire, named Chapel House, was constructed to the south of Danson House, which has now been separated from the rest of the park by a motorway, but can still be seen today near the roundabout at Blendon.

=== 1800–present ===
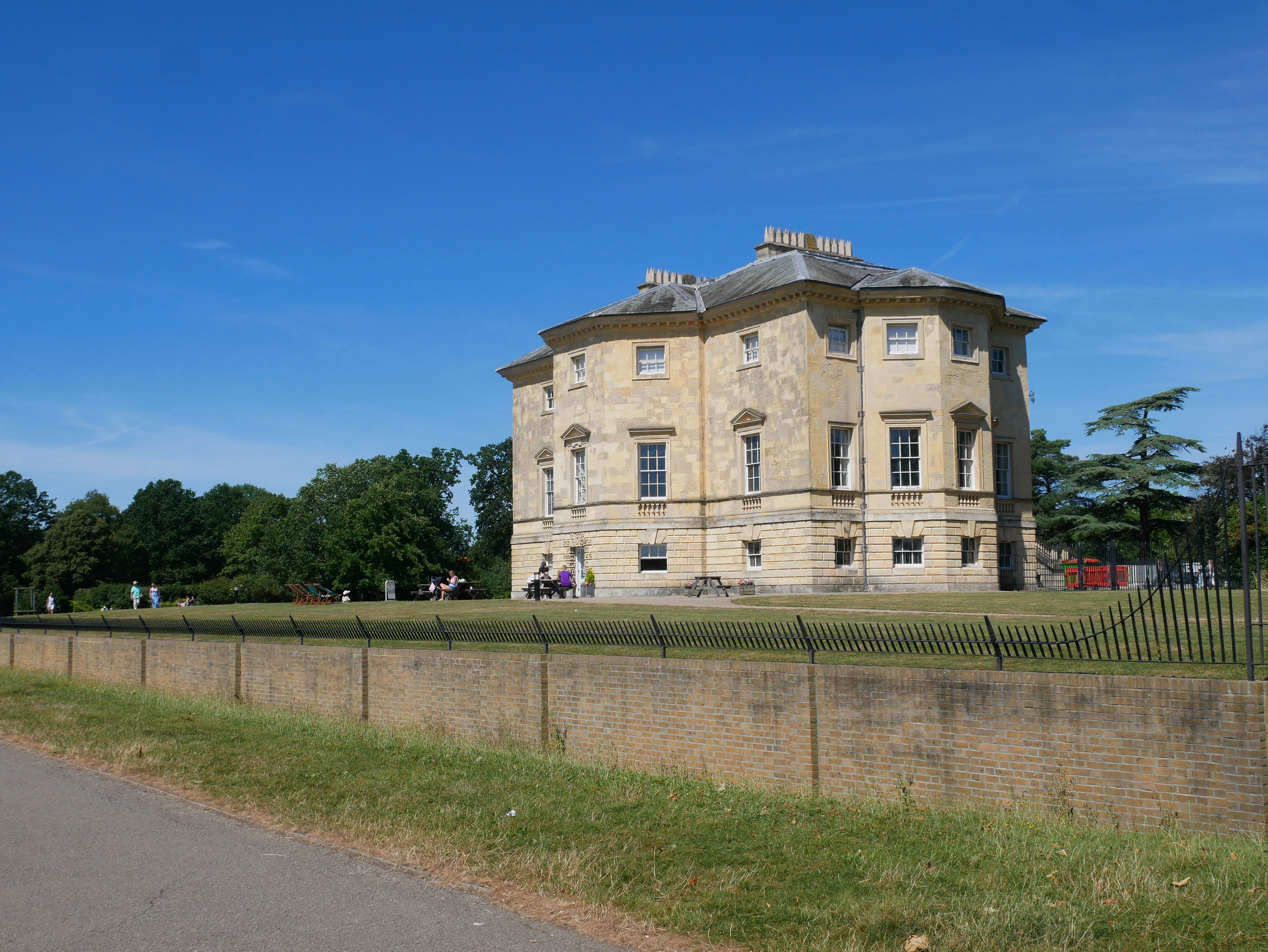
Southeast view of Danson House with the ha-ha in the foreground

After Sir John died in January 1800 (being buried in St Mary's churchyard, Lewisham), his son demolished the imposing wings containing kitchens and stables, and built the present stable block (design attributed to George Dance the Younger). He sold the estate in 1807 to John Johnston, a retired army captain of the 62nd Regiment of Foot and Freeman of the City of London. In 1829, it passed to Johnston's son Hugh. Hugh's daughter Sarah painted a number of watercolours of the interior in the 1860s with intricate detail, which were later of key use in the restoration of the interior. Hugh Johnston sold Danson to railway engineer Alfred Bean in 1862. Bean was the driving force behind the Bexleyheath Railway Company, and chairman of Bexley Local Board, and envisaged transforming the 582-acre (2.4 km^{2}) estate into a residential suburb. Outlying areas were sold off for residential development according to Bean's will, but the house and 224 acres of the estate remained in Bean's family after his death in 1890, until the death of his widow in 1921, when it was auctioned, and eventually acquired by Bexley Urban District Council for £16,000 in 1924. The park was opened to the public in 1925 by Princess Mary, while the house was used for civil defence purposes during World War Two. Over time football pitches, tennis courts and a bowling green have been added, along with an open-air swimming pool in 1936 and the Boathouse and Cafe, open to the public in 1964. The park is now used extensively by the community.

When the house was acquired by English Heritage in 1995, it was in a dangerously dilapidated condition, and was described by English Heritage as "the most significant building at risk in London". It was painstakingly restored in a ten-year £4.5m project by Purcell Miller Tritton architects. Bexley Heritage Trust, a local heritage charity, was involved in partnership with English Heritage from 2000 and completed the interior furnishing and fitting-out of the house prior to its reopening by Queen Elizabeth II in Spring 2005. The Danson Park grounds were also restored, funded by the Heritage Lottery Fund, in 2006. In 2016, the borough cancelled its grant to the Bexley Heritage Trust for the upkeep of the property, and the charity therefore withdrew to focus on Hall Place, and the house fell under direct management from the borough. The council has subsequently made Danson House the register office for Bexley Borough.

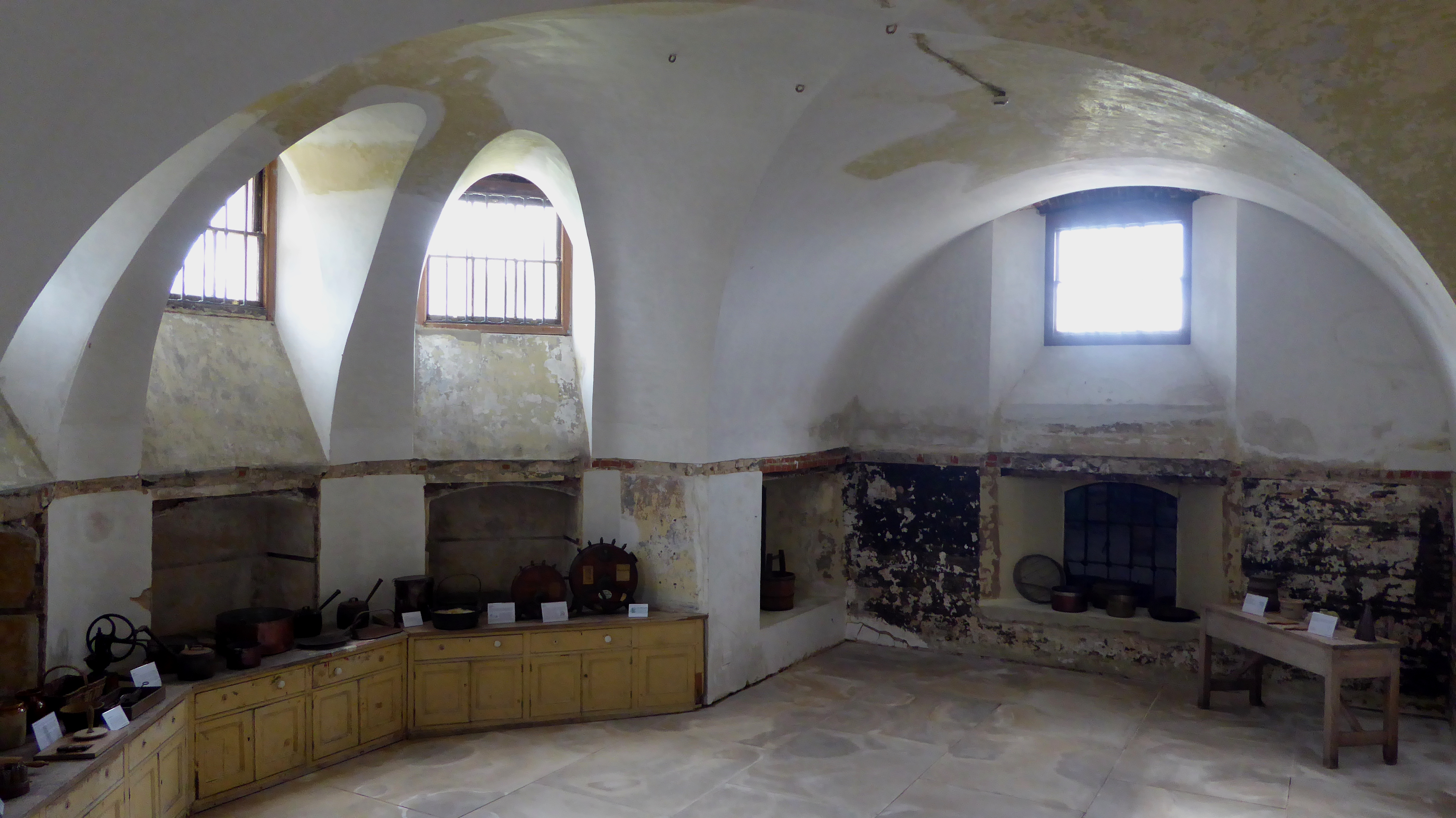
The basement was used as a kitchen during the 19th century

The house is now owned by English Heritage on a 999-year lease from 1997, and will eventually be managed by a trust. It is open to the public on selected viewing days. The estate's stable block is now a public house, the Danson Stables.

The house was used as a filming location for the 2017 historical TV drama Taboo, starring Tom Hardy.

== Bibliography ==
- Jardin, Ian Weir (2017). Layers of Understanding-Architectural Paint Research in Practice. Routledge. pp. 27–34. ISBN 9781134965601.
