= One Bell =

Pub in Crayford, London

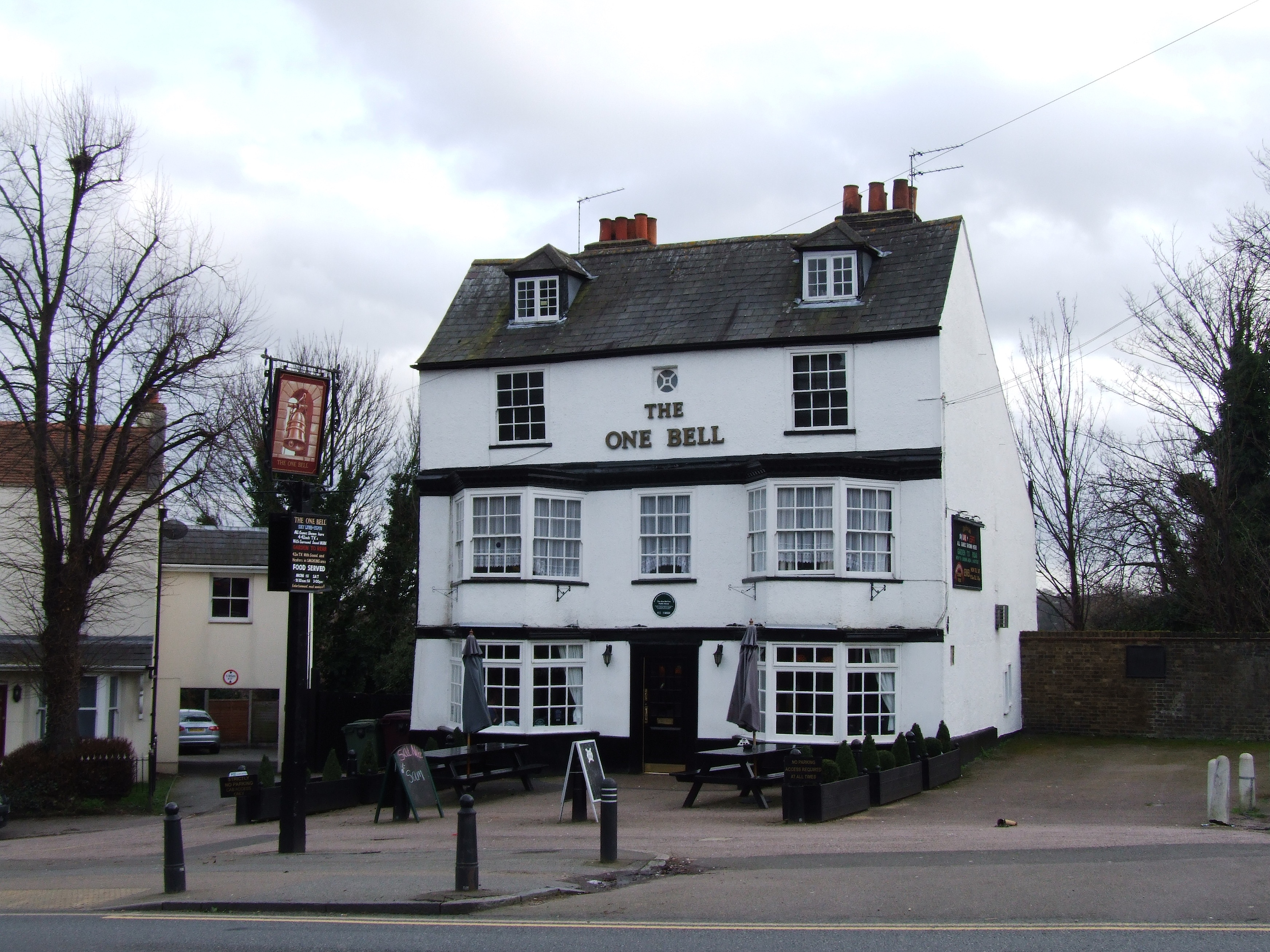
- The One Bell

- Location within London Borough of Bexley Location within Greater London

General information
- Location: Old Road, Crayford, London, England
- Coordinates: 51.453705°N 0.175351°E

Design and construction
- Designations

Listed Building – Grade II
- Official name: One Bell Public House
- Designated: 17 December 1980
- Reference no.: 1064198

One Bell is a pub in Old Road, Crayford, London, England.

It is a Grade II listed building that dates from the 18th century and is owned by former professional footballer Jimmy Bullard.
