= Royal Oak, Bexleyheath =

Pub in Bexleyheath, London

The Royal Oak
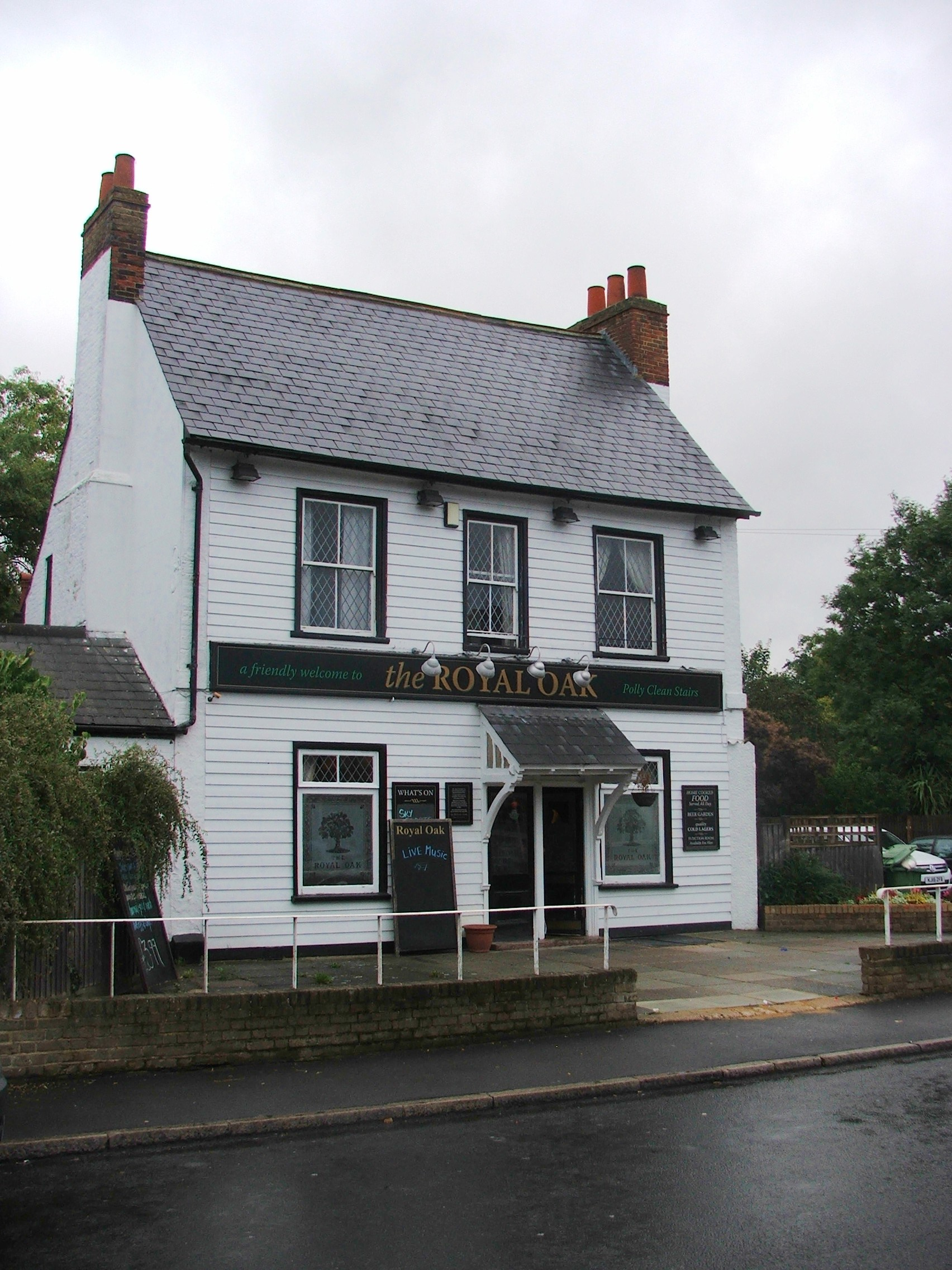
- Royal Oak

- Location within London Borough of Bexley Location within Greater London

General information
- Location: Mount Road, Bexleyheath, Kent, London, England
- Coordinates: 51.452534°N 0.127912°E

Design and construction
- Designations

Listed Building – Grade II
- Official name: Royal Oak Public House
- Designated: 17 December 1980
- Reference no.: 1064234

The Royal Oak is a pub in Mount Road, Bexleyheath, Greater London.

It is a Grade II listed building, built in the early 19th century.

== See also ==
- Pub names § Royal Oak
