= King's Head, Bexley =

Pub in Bexley, London

King's Head
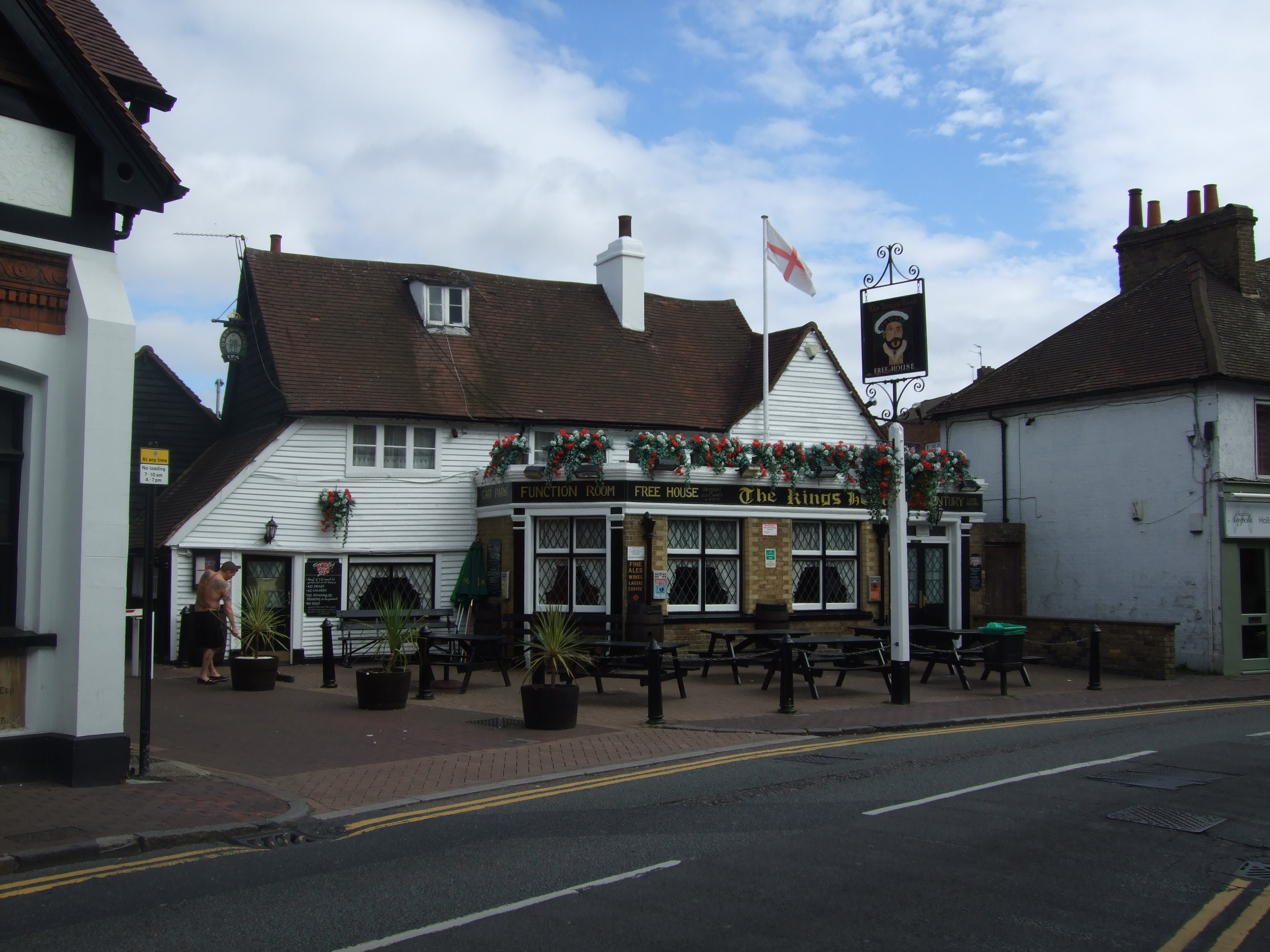
- The King's Head

- Location within London Borough of Bexley Location within Greater London

General information
- Location: 65 Bexley High Street, Bexley, London, England
- Coordinates: 51.441863°N 0.149894°E

Design and construction
- Designations

Listed Building – Grade II
- Official name: Kings Head Inn
- Designated: 1 October 1953
- Reference no.: 1064244

The King's Head is a pub at 65 Bexley High Street, Bexley, London. It is a Grade II listed building, dating back to the 16th or early 17th century.
