= Rose Bruford College =

Hgher education institution in Greater London

Coordinates: 51°26′20″N 0°6′24″E

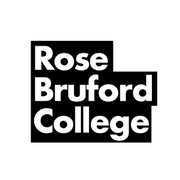
- Type: Performing Arts University
- Established: 1950
- Chairman: Janet Smith
- President: Ray Fearon
- Principal: Professor Randall Whittaker
- Students: 870 (2024/25)
- Undergraduates: 755 (2024/25)
- Postgraduates: 115 (2024/25)
- Location: London, England
- Campus: Suburban
- Website: bruford.ac.uk

Rose Bruford College (formerly Rose Bruford College of Theatre & Performance) is a higher education institution in the London Borough of Bexley. Bruford has degree programmes in acting, actor musicianship, lighting, costume production, scenic arts and other creative industries disciplines.

== History ==
In 1950 Rose Elizabeth Bruford, Edith Scorer and Mary Henniker-Heaton established The Rose Bruford Training College of Speech and Drama. Archival records held in the College Library testify to their resilience and self-confidence in the face of many setbacks. The college’s impressive list of founding patrons included Peggy Ashcroft, Laurence Olivier and Sybil Thorndike.

The Kent Education Committee offered to lease to her Lamorbey House, an 18th-century, Grade II listed manor house for £5 per year.

== From early years to the present day ==
As the gender balance of the student body demonstrated in its first decades, Rose Bruford College offered important opportunities to young women. In an article in the journal Women’s Employment, Rose described the challenges faced by women with "theatrical leanings" and encouraged young women not to overlook teaching as a viable profession.

The College is known for its early commitment to Children's theatre, from its Saturday Morning Club in the 1950s to the present day Centre for Theatre for Young Audiences. Rose described children as “very discriminating and extraordinarily interesting to play to” and insisted that students “play these parts just as sincerely and honestly as they would play an adult part”.

When she enrolled at Rose Bruford college, Yvonne Brewster was one of the first Black female drama students in the UK, alongside Gambian playwright Janet Badjan-Young and Trevor Rhone. Rhone wrote about his time at Rose Bruford in his play Bellas Gate Boy. Bernadine Evaristo, Paulette Randall and Patricia Hilaire founded Theatre of Black Women, Britain's first black women's theatre company after meeting at Rose Bruford College on the Community Theatre Arts course.

== Lamorbey House ==
Rose Bruford College is based in and around Lamorbey House and Gardens, which are Grade II listed and sit at the heart of what was once a large country estate including farmland and woodland. Lamorbey House was at one point owned by the Malcolm family, known for the Malcolm Collection, now owned by the British Museum. The family contributed further additions to Lamorbey, including the chapel now known as Holy Trinity Lamorbey and the distinctive yellow-brick house on Burnt Oak Lane, once a schoolroom.

The campus has since been expanded. Construction of several new buildings was completed in 2002. The college's research facilities and archives include the Stanislavski Centre and the Clive Barker Library. Members or former members of its faculty serve as editors and/or on the editorial boards of such performing-arts journals as New Theatre Quarterly and Performance Prompt.

When the Academy of Live and Recorded Arts closed in April 2022, Rose Bruford offered a place to all ALRA's students.

In 2026 Rose Bruford College was ranked second in London for Teaching Quality at the Whatuni Student Choice Awards and achieved a place in the Top 10 in London for University of the Year.

The College ranks third for student satisfaction and places in the top five for entry standards across all UK specialist performing arts institutions in the Complete University Guide Performing Arts Table 2027.

== Notable alumni ==
College alumnus Ray Fearon followed as the new President of the College in November 2024. Bernardine Evaristo, the 2019 Booker Prize winner, succeeded Richard Eyre as college president in 2021.

Acting alumni include Hayley Squires, Gary Oldman, Mathew Baynton, Tom Baker, Tom Hopper, Graham Hamilton, Edward Peel, Christopher Pizzey, Lake Bell, Rosalie Craig, Giovanna Fletcher, Hannah Walters, Stephen Graham, Nick Darke, Sam Palladio, Jessica Gunning, Kerry Godliman, Mem Fox, Marc Duret, Tom Read Wilson, and Lauryn Redding.

== See also ==
- Bird College
