= Hurstmere School =

Coordinates: 51.4387°N 0.1144°E

Location
- Hurst Road; Sidcup, Greater London, DA15 9AW; England

Information
- Type: Academy
- Motto: "Believe and achieve"
- Department for Education URN: 137368 Tables
- Ofsted: Reports
- Principal: L L Bennett
- Gender: Male
- Age: 11 to 16
- Enrolment: 982 (in 2024)
- Houses: Caxton, Cobham, Sidney, Chaucer
- Website: https://www.hurstmere.org.uk/

Hurstmere School (formerly Hurstmere Foundation School for Boys, formerly Hurstmere Secondary Modern School for Boys) is an all-boys secondary school with academy status, located on Hurst Road in Sidcup, a suburb of London, England. It shares its site with the Jumping Jacks Day Nursery. The school was designated as a sports college in 2003 and also as a science college in 2008. In February 2012, the school was converted to an academy under the Academies Act 2010.

In 2007 the school was in the top 50 most improved schools over the past three years. In 2010, the school was reported as achieving a 41% rate for at least five GCSEs at A* to C grade including maths and English among its 207 GCSE students, and an overall A* to C pass rate in at least five exams of 74%. In July 2011, its GCSE results improved. 85% of students gained at least five A* to C grades with 58% gaining five A* to C grades in subjects including Maths and English.

An Ofsted inspection report in 2014 rated the school as "good", with an "excellent" capacity for sustained improvement. The report remarked on the school's "outstanding leadership" and the marked improvement in attendance since the last inspection in December 2007.

The school holds an annual prize-giving ceremony which commends students who have done exceptionally well in their subjects. The prizes are presented by a guest speaker who is usually associated with the school or its specialist subjects.

The school has a few guest speakers visit each year to inform students about life choices, these include Peter York and a local Olympian.
