= Sir John Boyd, 1st Baronet =

Sir John Boyd, 1st Baronet Boyd (29 December 1718 in St Kitts, Leeward Islands – 24 January 1800 in Danson Hill) was a sugar merchant and vice-chairman of the British East India Company. He built Danson House, and was the first English owner of the Piranesi Vase.

== Life ==
He was the only child of Augustus Boyd (1679–1765), a northern Irish merchant who owned several sugar estates on the islands and later moved to London to set up trade links there with the plantations. John went into this family business, but not before he had read theology and classics at Christ Church, Oxford and taken a Grand Tour of the continent.

Settling in Lewisham and marrying his first wife, Mary Bumpstead, in the early 1740s, he purchased the 200-acre (0.81 km^{2}) lease at Danson in 1753, followed by the site he intended for Danson House in 1762, secured via an Act of Parliament. Elected director of the East India Company in April 1753, he served on the company's court until 1764, and backed the peace made by Britain in 1763 at the end of the Seven Years' War.

Having given birth to four children, Mary died in 1763, and John remarried to Catherine Chapone in 1766 (with whom he had three more children). Having inherited his father's estate in the meantime, he began work on the house and, in 1772, 1775 and 1776, took tours of Spain, France and Belgium to collect art to fill it.

Boyd was made a baronet in 1775, but his plantations were beginning to fail and the final blow was the capture of St Kitts by the French in 1779. This and the death of two of his children in 1772 and 1779 turned him into a recluse, rarely leaving Danson and never entering London society. Even after being able to repay his debts through a loan from Paul Benfield (one of Boyd's clerks who had made his fortune in India), he did not leave Danson until his death there in 1800. His son John (1750–1815) auctioned off his father's large collection of paintings and drawings, demolished the imposing wings at Danson containing kitchens and stables, and built the house's present stable block, before selling the estate in 1807.

Peerage of Great Britain
New creation	Baronet (of Danson); 1775–1800	Succeeded by John Boyd
