= Jubilee Walkway =

Official walking route in London, England

Coordinates: 51.5082°N 0.1126°W

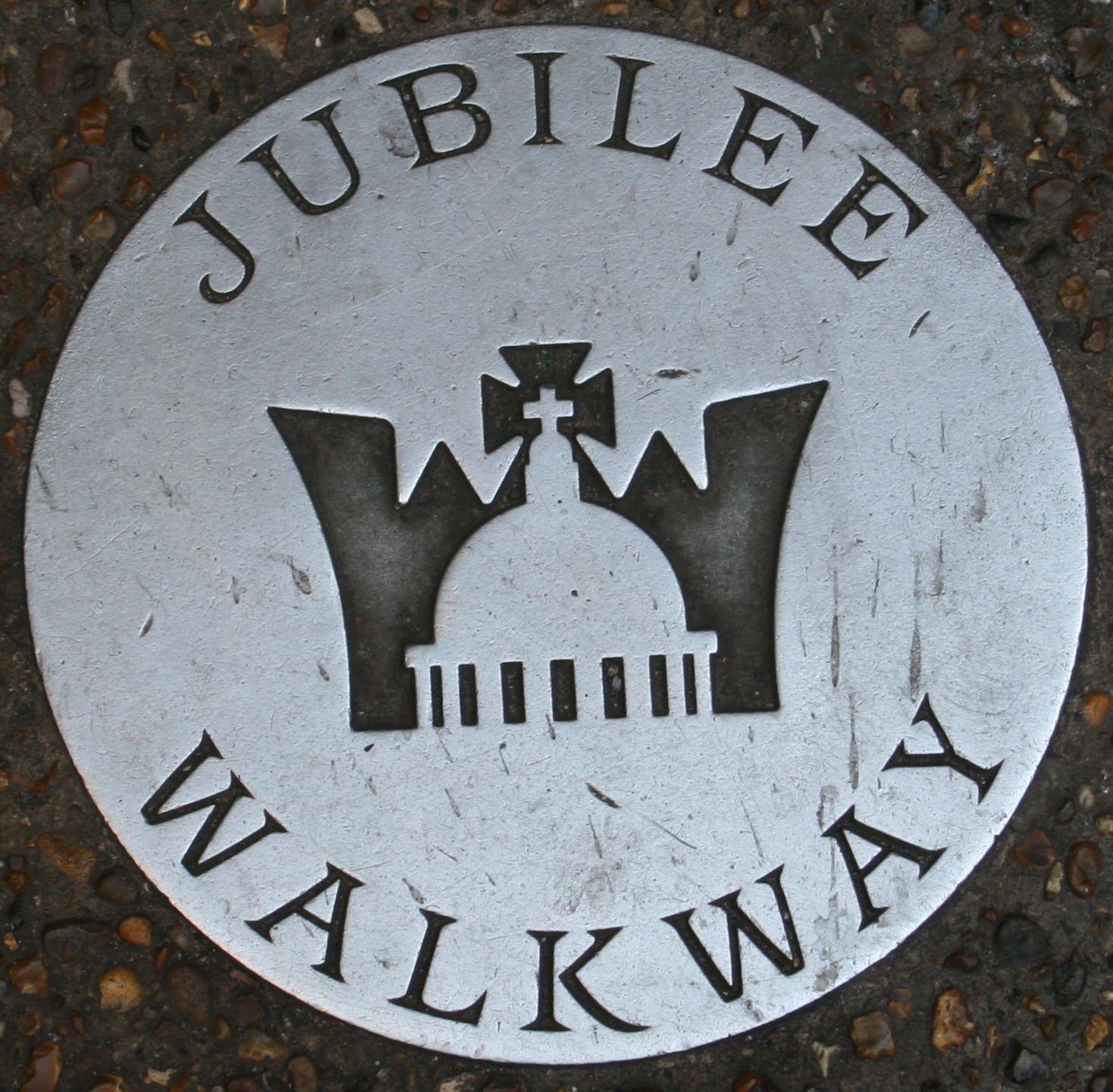
- A ground marker for the Jubilee Walkway
- Length: 15 mi
- Location: London, United Kingdom
- Season: All year

The Jubilee Walkway is an official walking route in London. It was originally opened as the Silver Jubilee Walkway to commemorate Queen Elizabeth II's accession; the Queen herself opened it on 9 June 1977 during her silver jubilee celebrations. The intention was to connect many of London's major tourist attractions and it is now one of seven such walks within the Mayor of London's strategic walking routes. Its length is 15 miles.

The Jubilee Walkway Trust was set up in 1978 to look after the trail, in collaboration with local authorities.

On 24 October 2002, during the Queen's golden jubilee, the renamed Jubilee Walkway (the word Silver was dropped as appropriate) reopened after refurbishment and a new spur walk was opened in 2003, called the Camden loop, which took walkers into north-west London.

The Jubilee Walkway can be divided into five smaller loop walks: the Western loop, Eastern loop, City loop, Camden loop and Jubilee loop.

== Major sites ==
Western loop

The longest loop within the Jubilee Walkway, the Western loop is six miles in length and originates at Leicester Square in the West End of London. Walking in an anti-clockwise direction, some of the major sites taken in on the loop include:

- National Gallery
- Trafalgar Square
- Admiralty Arch
- St. James's Park
- Parliament Square
- Westminster Abbey
- Lambeth Palace
- London Eye
- OXO Tower
- Tate Modern
- Millennium Footbridge
- St Paul's Cathedral
- Lincoln's Inn Fields
- Sir John Soane's Museum
- Royal Opera House
- Covent Garden
- London Transport Museum
- National Portrait Gallery

Eastern loop

Five miles in length, the Eastern loop originates at the Tate Modern. Walking in an anti-clockwise direction, some of the main attractions on the Eastern loop include:

- Shakespeare's Globe Theatre
- Golden Hinde
- Southwark Cathedral
- Hay's Galleria
- HMS Belfast
- City Hall
- Tower Bridge
- Tower of London
- St Katharine Docks
- The Monument
- Bank of England
- Royal Exchange
- Mansion House
- Millennium Footbridge

City loop

The City loop is the shortest of the five on the Jubilee Walkway and originates at Bank junction in the heart of the City of London. Walking anti-clockwise, the major sites on the City loop include:

- No 1 Poultry
- The Guildhall
- Guildhall Art Gallery
- London Wall
- Barbican Centre
- St. Giles' church
- Museum of London
- One New Change
- Paternoster Square
- London Stock Exchange
- St Paul's Cathedral
- City of London School

Camden loop

The three-mile Camden loop originates on Chancery Lane. Walking in an anti-clockwise direction, the major points of interest on the Camden loop include:

- Maughan Library
- Coram's Fields
- Brunswick Square
- Brunswick Centre
- British Library
- University College London
- School of Oriental and African Studies
- British Museum

Jubilee loop

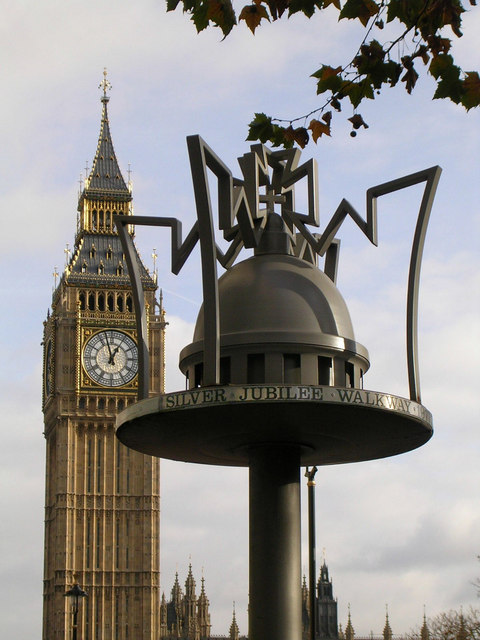
A walkway marker at Parliament Square

The fifth and final sub-loop on the walkway is the 1.7-mile Jubilee loop, originating at Trafalgar Square and focusing on the British monarchy. Walking in an anti-clockwise direction, the main attractions on the Jubilee loop include:

- Admiralty Arch
- Victoria Memorial
- Buckingham Palace
- Birdcage Walk
- St Stephen's Club
- Wellington Barracks
- Parliament Square
- St. James's Park
