= Hampton Court Park =

Park in South London, England

Coordinates: 51.401°N 0.324°W

Home Park
- Site of Special Scientific Interest
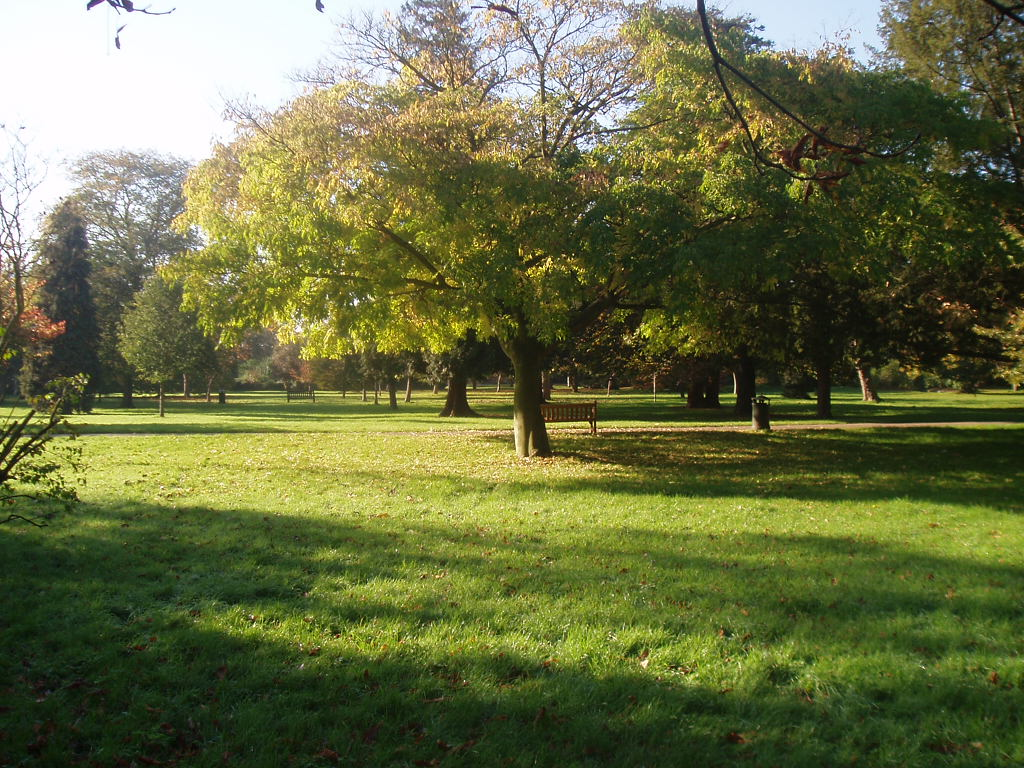
- Location of Home Park.
- Area of search: Greater London
- Grid reference: TQ167683
- Interest: Biological
- Area: 88.9 ha (220 acres)
- Notification date: 2014
- Location map: Magic Map

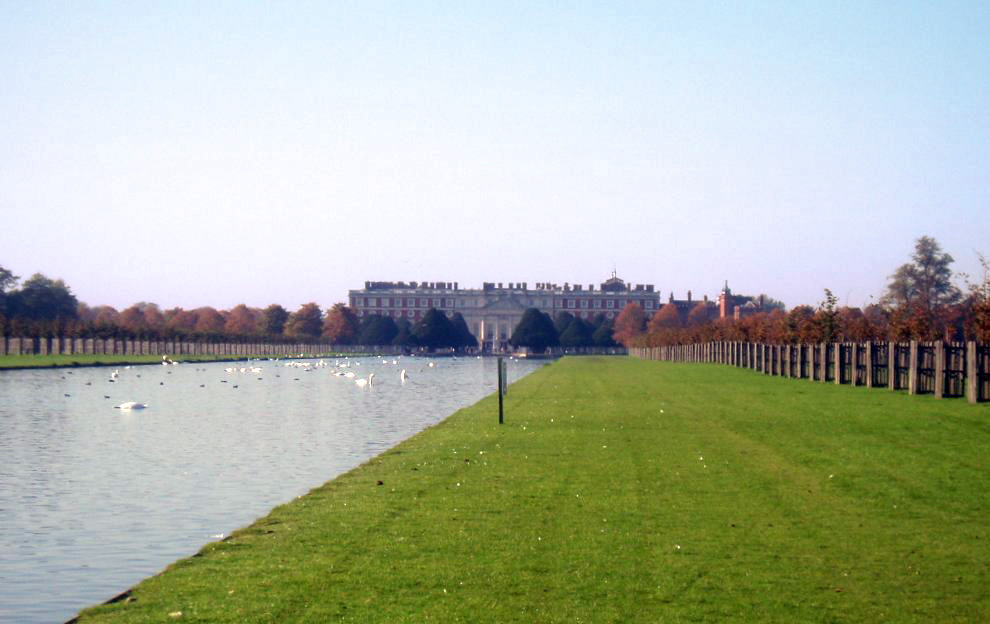
Hampton Court, from the park

Hampton Court Park, also known as Home Park, is a walled royal park managed by the Historic Royal Palaces. The park lies between the gardens of Hampton Court Palace and Kingston upon Thames and Surbiton in south west London, England, mostly within the post town of East Molesey, but with its eastern extremity within the post town of Kingston.

In 2014, part of the park was designated a biological Site of Special Scientific Interest (with Bushy Park and Hampton Court Golf Course). It takes up most of the final (lowest) meander of the non-tidal reaches of the River Thames and is mainly divided between a golf course, meadows interspersed with trees used for deer, seasonal horse grazing and wildlife. A corner of the park is used annually for the Hampton Court Flower Show and the part nearest to the palace has the Long Water — an early set of hydro-engineered ponds or lakes, fed by water from the distant River Colne, as are the bodies of water in the neighbouring park, Bushy Park.

== Location ==
=== Plant and animal life ===
Hampton Court Park is a walled deer park of around 700 acres (280 ha) (1.1 sq mi), with a herd of fallow deer, and has been open to the public since 1894. Verges by the A308 road lightly scattered with deciduous trees line the northern wall. These trees, with few evergreens, continue across much of the park. There are three avenues of lime trees that radiate across the park in a crow's foot pattern from Hampton Court Gardens. One runs north-eastwards towards Kingston; one runs south-eastwards towards Ditton; and the third runs eastwards and includes the Long Water lake.

Cardinal Wolsey enclosed with a wall about 2,000 acres (800 ha) to form this park and Bushy Park for the establishment of an exceptionally grand house over the former manor house of Hampton. It formed what became before his death Hampton Court Palace, taken over by Henry VIII. The king was an avid hunter and had the park used for breeding rabbits and/or hares, pheasants and partridges.

The inventory of Cromwell's goods made in 1659 records "about 700 deer", compared to "about 1,700" and "about 30 red deer" in Bushy Park.

=== Medieval Oak ===
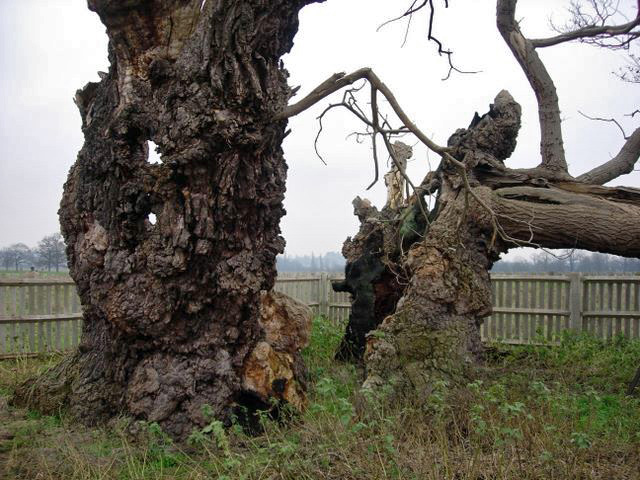
The Medieval Oak – said to be 750 years old

A tree, called the Medieval Oak (or Methuselah's Oak), in one of the tees for the golf course in the southern part of the park, is said to be 750 years old.

=== Drained water meadow since medieval period ===
The public towpath by the lowest part of the non-tidal Thames above Teddington Lock lies in all other directions apart from the palace (west). An emergency conditions flood meadow but not a lowered "Flood Storage Area" most of it is in planning (policy Flood Zone 2 or 3, and mostly in long term flood risk zones ranging across its four categories (very low to high risk) High risk, affecting a small portion means that each year this area has a chance of flooding of greater than 3.3%.

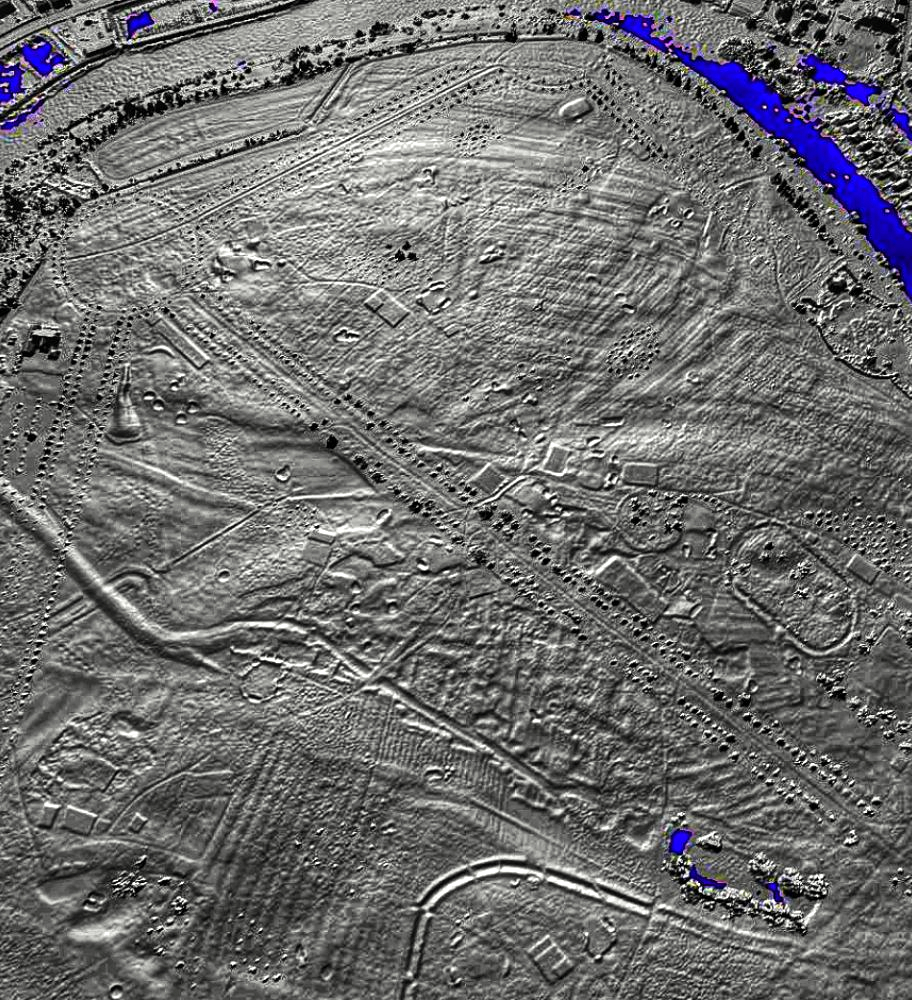
A near-vertical lidar view of Hampton Court Palace golf course (south top) revealing extensive archaeological residues

North of the road and a cluster of houses connected with the parks is a narrow set of Paddocks and Bushy Park; the Royal Mews graze horses on the park in the summer.

The Long Water or Longwater Canal is a large garden canal constructed by Charles II for his wife Catherine of Braganza, and given a curved extension at the palace end by William III. It is now the namesake of a lake of the 1730s in Kensington Gardens (see The Long Water), and indeed other large garden canals at Wrest Park and elsewhere. It flows gently in the park roughly eastward from the back of Hampton Court Palace ending at the Golden Jubilee Fountain and is underground connected to a landscaped channel, the Longford River after the Upper Lodge Water Gardens and the Diana Fountain, Bushy Park.

== Flower Show ==
The annual Hampton Court Flower Show is held in 25 acres (10 ha) of the park. It is organised by the Royal Horticultural Society and began in 1990. Many prefer it to the better known Chelsea Flower Show because there is more space, and plants and equipment can be bought at the show. The show has sometimes been criticised for risking damage to historic features in the park.

== See also ==
- List of Sites of Special Scientific Interest in Greater London
