= The Long Water =

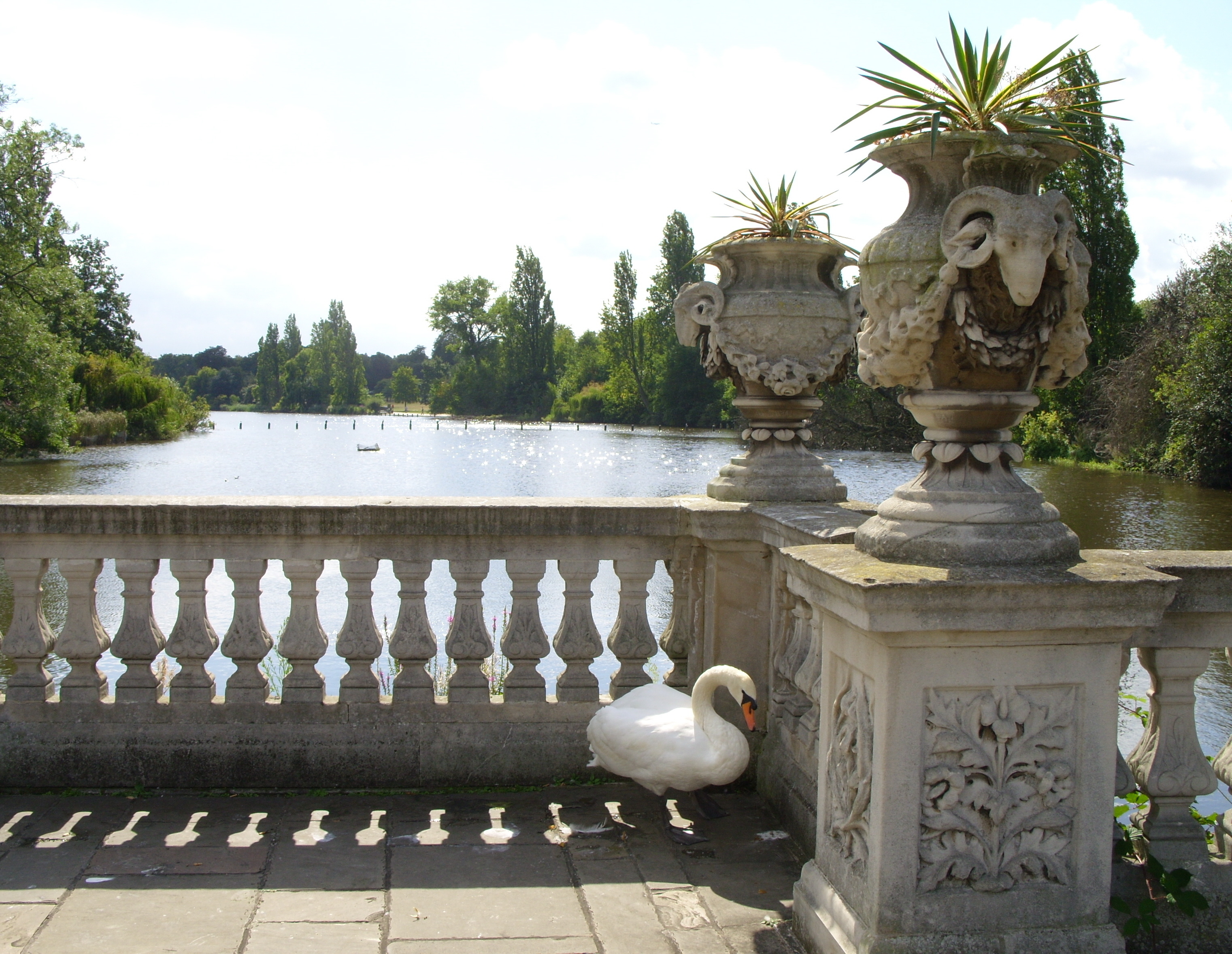
- The Long Water from the Italian Garden

- Location within Greater London
- Location: London, England
- Coordinates: 51.507378°N 0.174444°W
- Type: Artificial lake
- Primary inflows: Three boreholes from the upper chalk
- Primary outflows: Storm Relief Sewer
- Basin countries: England

The Long Water is a recreational lake in Kensington Gardens, London, England, created in 1730 at the behest of Caroline of Ansbach. The Long Water refers to the long and narrow western half of the lake. The eastern half is known as the Serpentine. Serpentine Bridge, which marks the boundary between Hyde Park and Kensington Gardens, also marks the Long Water's eastern boundary.

The Long Water and the Serpentine are generally considered to be part of one lake.

== Geography ==
Originally the lake was fed by the River Westbourne entering at the Italian Garden at the north-western end of the Long Water. The Westbourne ceased to provide the water for the Serpentine in 1834, as the river had become polluted, and so water was then pumped from the Thames. The water is now supplied by three boreholes drilled into the Upper Chalk. The first borehole is located at the Italian Gardens, the second at the Diana Memorial and the third, drilled in 2012 to a depth of 132m, is within 50m of the Diana Memorial. The Long Water runs south-east from this point to Serpentine Bridge, where the lake curves to the east, following the natural contours of the land. At the eastern end, water flows out of the lake via a sluice in the dam, forming a small ornamental waterfall at the Dell. The outflow has not historically maintained the waterfall, and re-circulation pumps were installed in the Dell, below the dam, to sustain this feature. The restoration work in 2012 restored the flows into the Serpentine and this waterfall is now restored as originally designed. Historically the river flowed due south from this point, marking the boundary between Westminster and Kensington, but since 1850 it has been diverted into a culvert, running underground to reach the Thames near Chelsea Bridge.

The lake as a whole (including the Serpentine) has a maximum depth of 17 feet (5.3 m). The lake is often reported to be deeper, but bathymetric surveys by the Royal Park in 2010 revealed the design of the lake.

== History ==
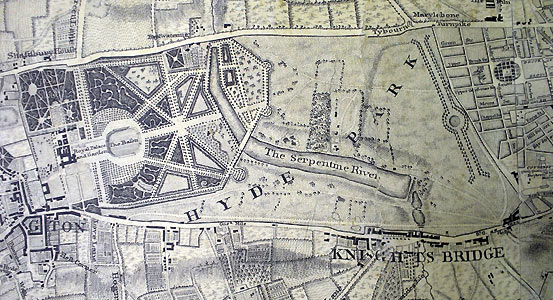
Detail of the 1746 Rocque map showing the newly constructed Serpentine. The paths converging on the Round Pond to the west of the lake are also visible.

In 1730 Queen Caroline, wife of George II, ordered the damming of the River Westbourne in Hyde Park as part of a general redevelopment of Hyde Park and Kensington Gardens. Original monastic ponds may have existed in the location; these were modified as part of the 1730–1732 scheme to create a single lake. At that time, the Westbourne formed eleven natural ponds in the park. During the 1730s, the lake filled to its current size and shape. The redevelopment was carried out by Royal Gardener Charles Bridgeman, who dammed the Westbourne to create the artificial lake, and dug a large pond in the centre of Kensington Gardens (The Round Pond) to be a focal point for pathways in the park.

At the time of construction, artificial lakes were typically long and straight. The Serpentine was one of the earliest artificial lakes designed to appear natural, and was widely imitated in parks and gardens nationwide.

The lake achieved notoriety in December 1816 when Harriet Westbrook, the pregnant wife of the poet Percy Bysshe Shelley, was found drowned in the Serpentine having left a suicide note addressed to her father, sister and husband. Shelley married Mary Wollstonecraft Godwin less than two weeks later.

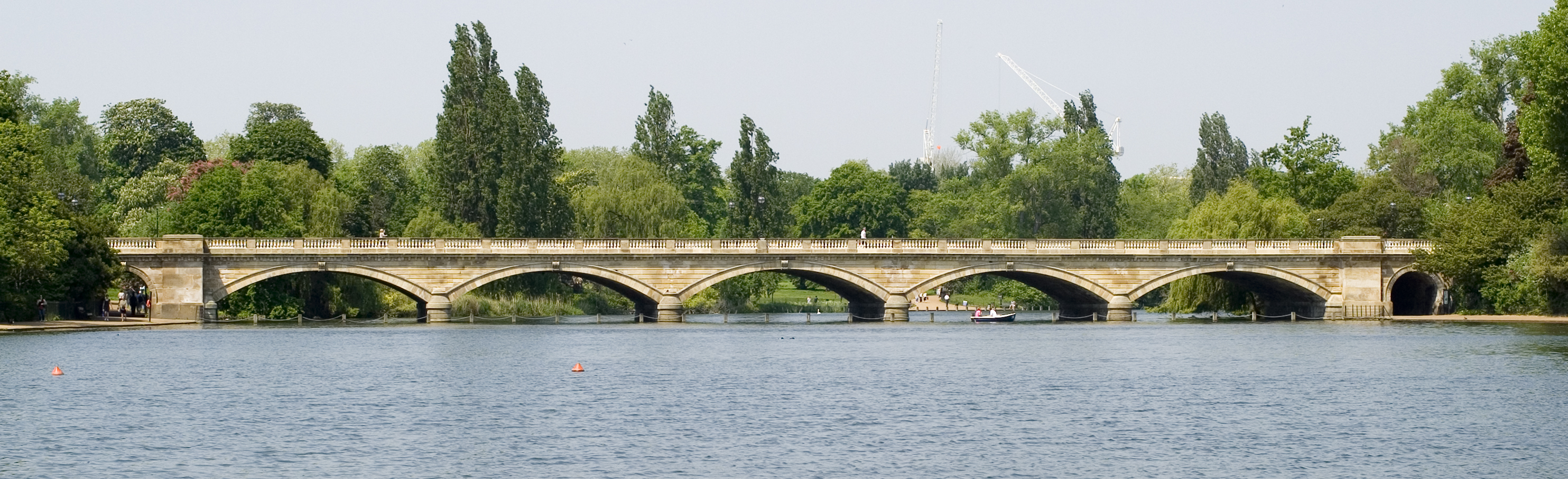
Serpentine Bridge

The lake formed a focal point of the 1814 celebrations which marked a century of Hanoverian rule and re-enacted the British victory at Trafalgar nine years previously, and of the 1851 Great Exhibition, with the Crystal Palace standing on its southern shore. Following the introduction of more stringent regulations to protect the environment in the park, the relocation of the Crystal Palace, and the construction of the nearby Albertopolis complex of museums and exhibitions, large-scale events ceased to take place on the banks of the Serpentine. However, it was the location for the 1977 Silver Jubilee celebrations, and a venue for the 2012 Olympics.

In the 1820s, the park was extensively redesigned by Decimus Burton. At the same time, John Rennie built the Serpentine Bridge to carry the newly built West Carriage Drive along the boundary between Hyde Park and Kensington Gardens, dividing the lake into the Serpentine (east) and the Long Water (west).

== Environs ==
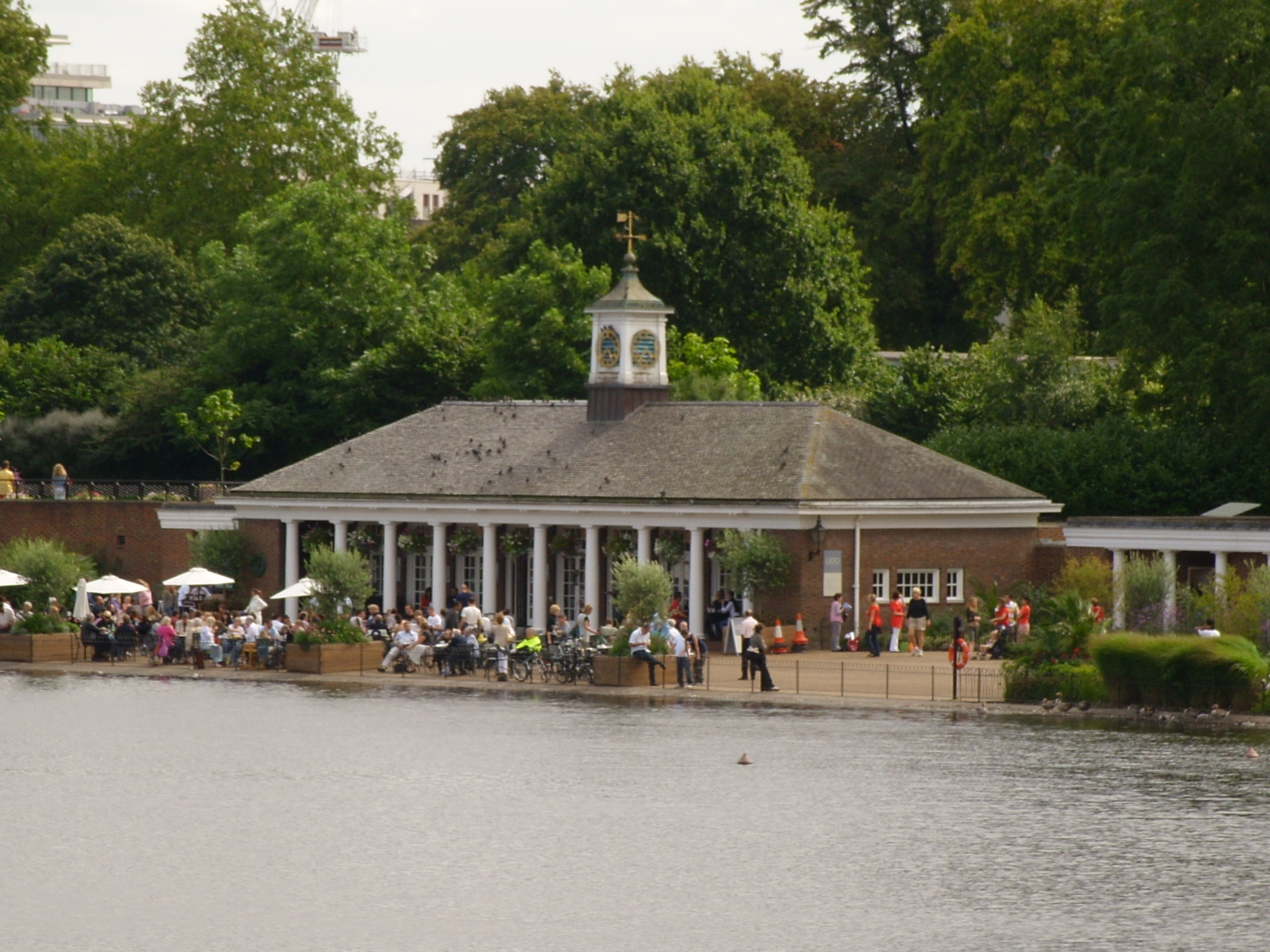
Lansbury's Lido

At the northern end of the Long Water are five fountains surrounded by classical statuary and sculpture in an area officially known as the Italian Gardens. A large bronze memorial to Edward Jenner, the developer of modern vaccination, dominates the area; it was originally located in Trafalgar Square in 1858, but four years later was moved to its present site. In recent years there has been an ongoing campaign for the memorial to be moved to the empty plinth in Trafalgar Square.

The Long Water is designated as a bird sanctuary. It has important populations of breeding waterfowls, and in winter there are many migratory visitors. A 2005 survey showed it as home to 90 species of moth alone. On the western bank of the Long Water, deliberately hidden in foliage, is a bronze Peter Pan statue by George Frampton. The "real world" elements of the play and novel were set in the park and in the surrounding streets.

== Image gallery ==
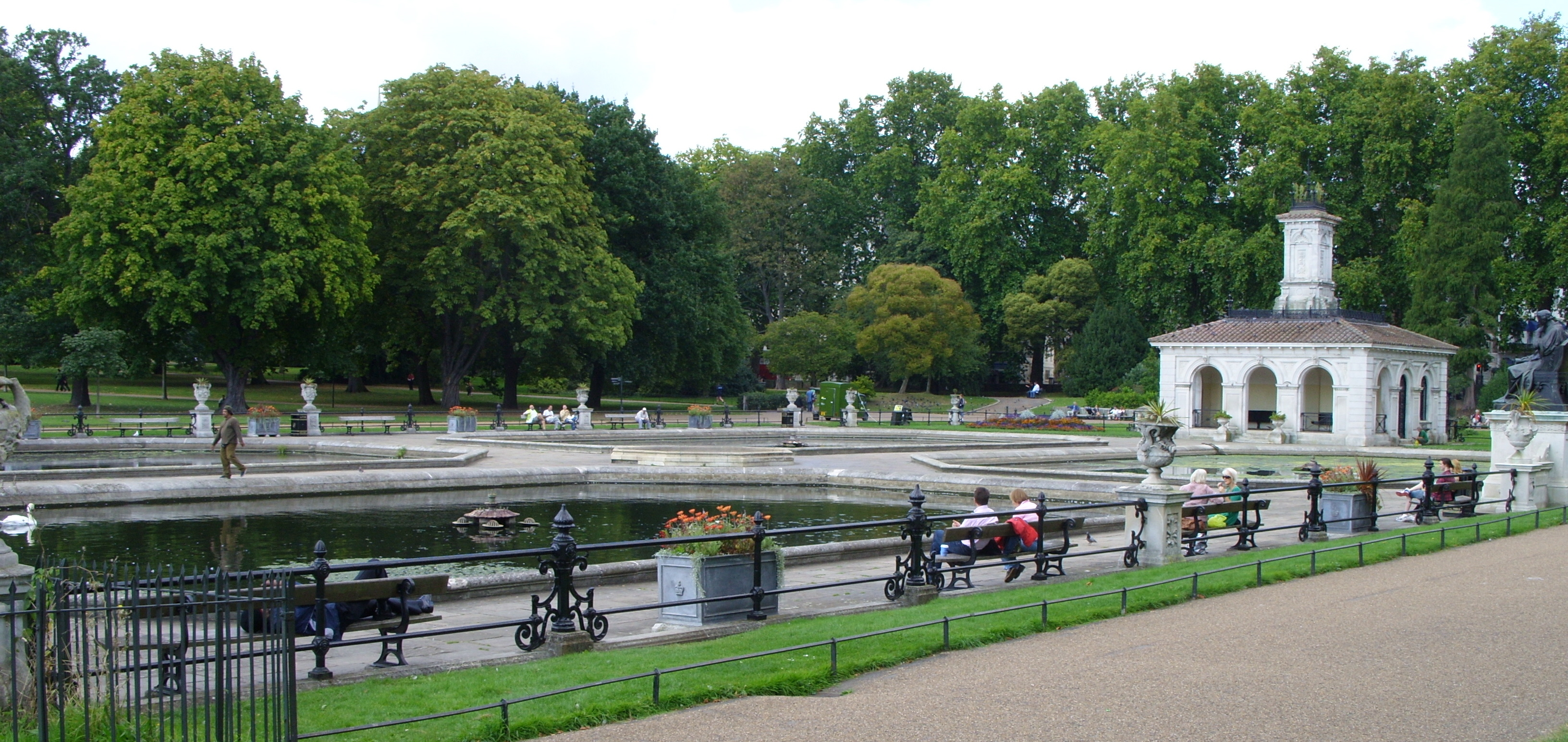
The Italian Garden; the fountains are fed by a borehole into the Upper Chalk.

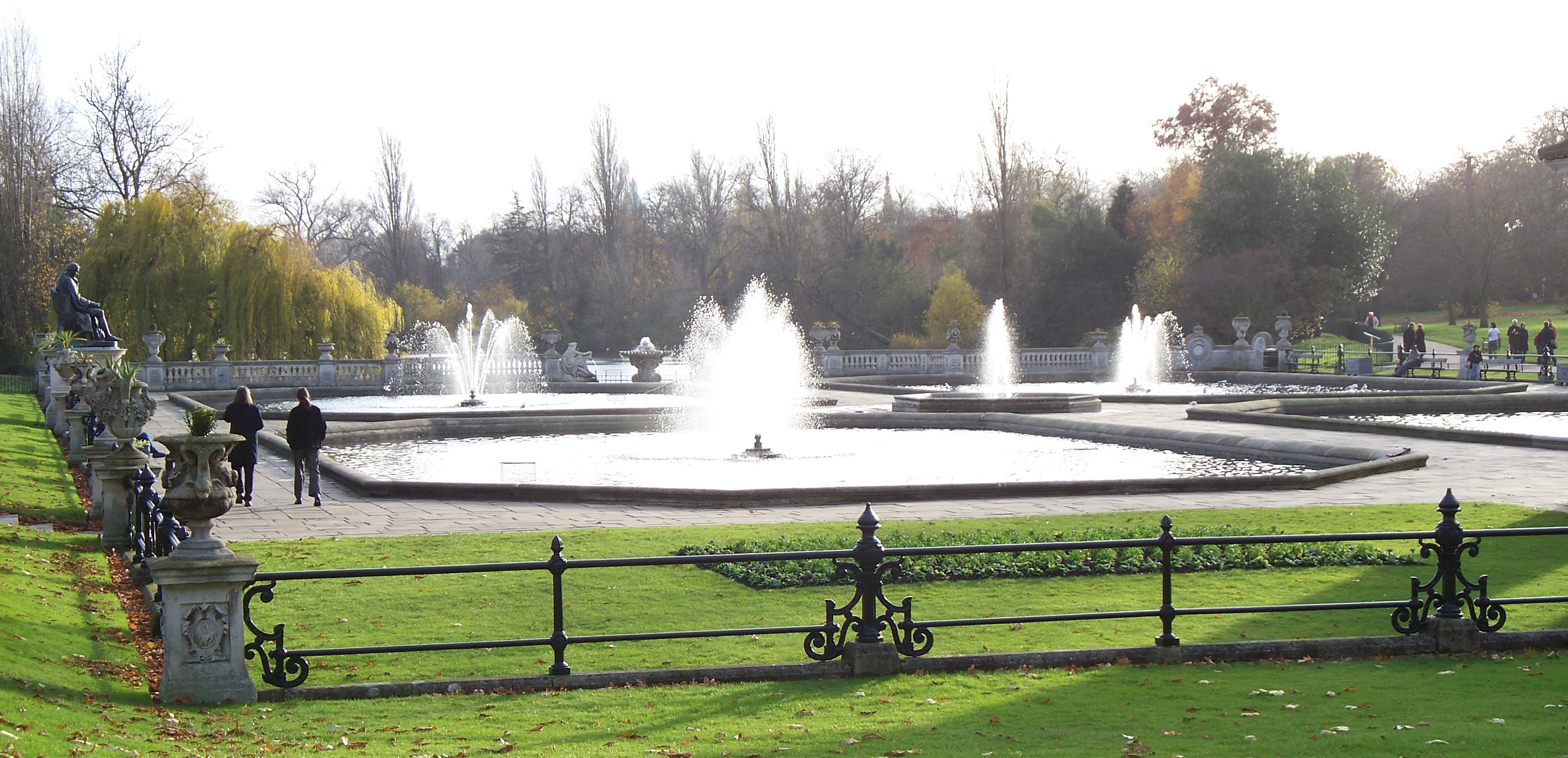
Fountains in the Italian Garden

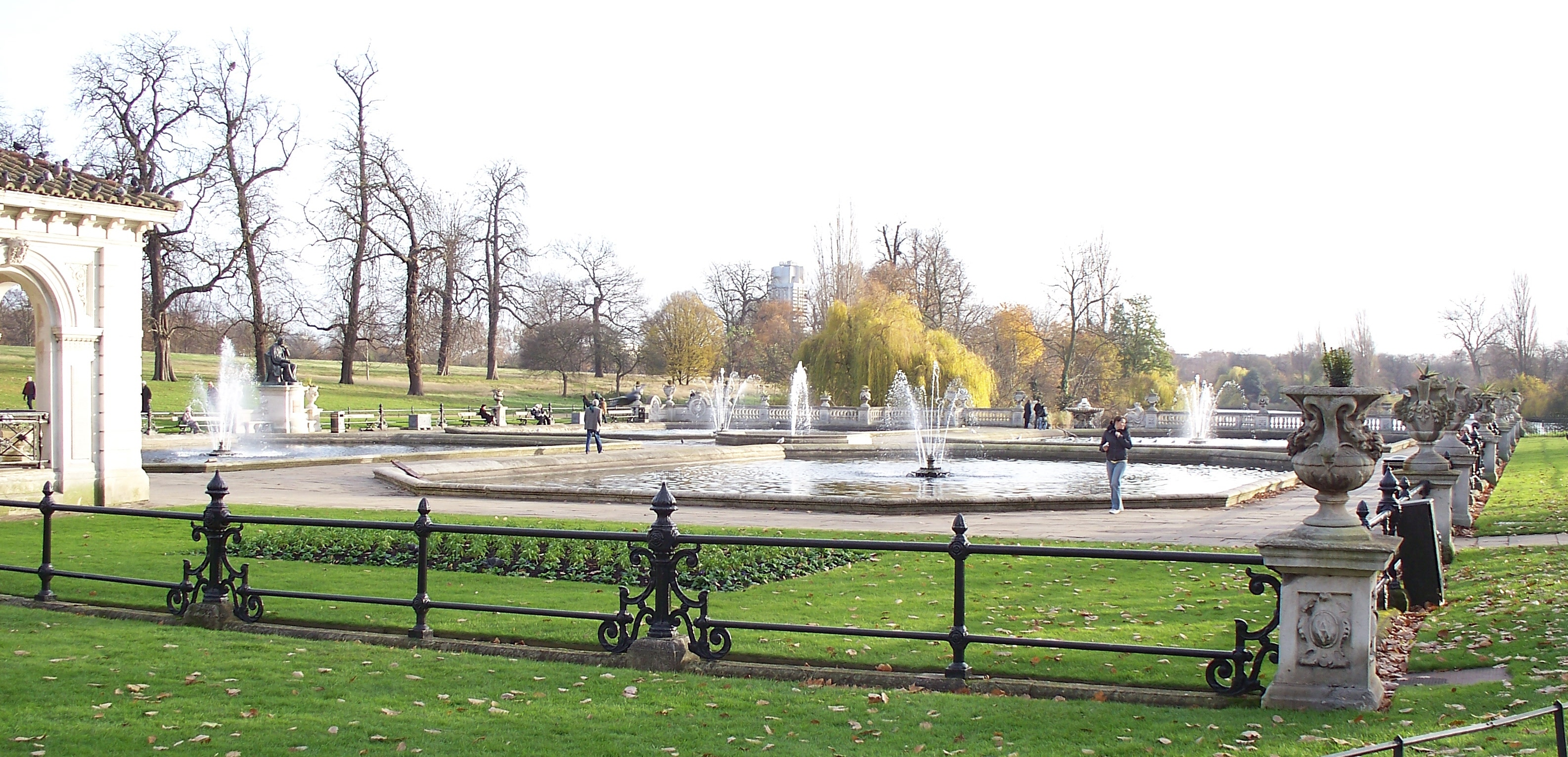
The Italian Garden

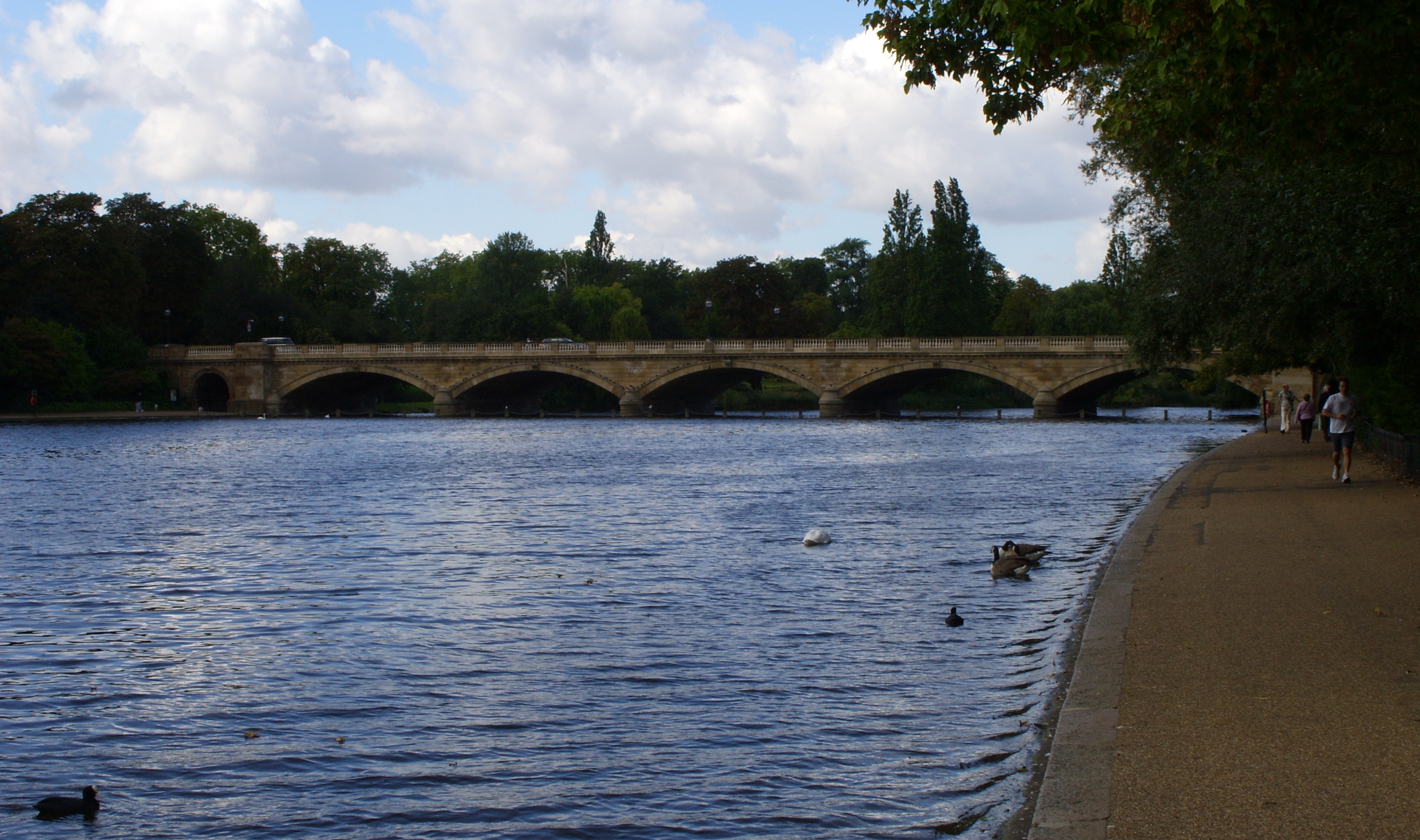
Serpentine Bridge from the north bank

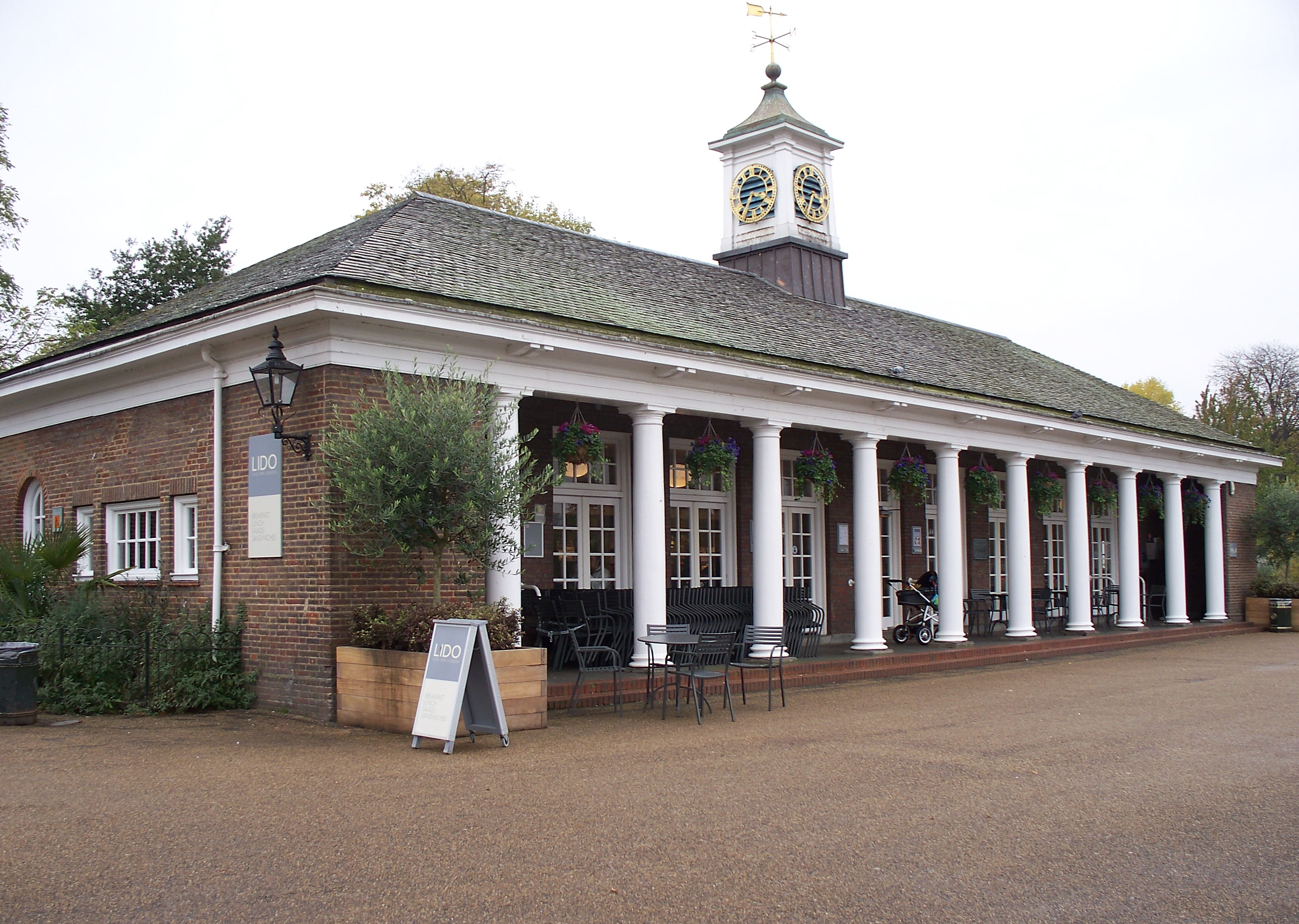
Lansbury's Lido

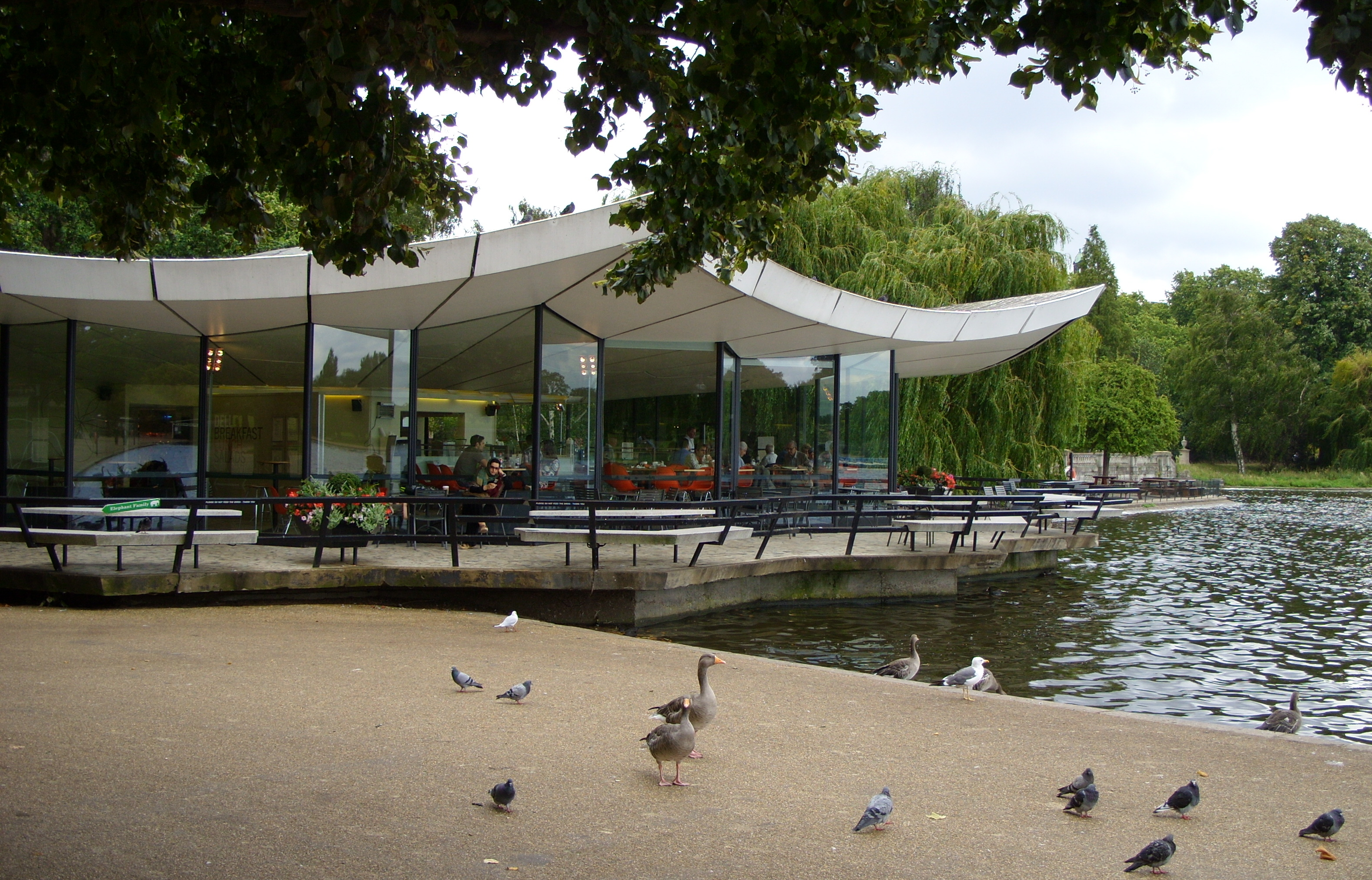
The brutalist architecture of the Dell Restaurant, situated on the northern end of the dam, dominates the eastern end of the lake.

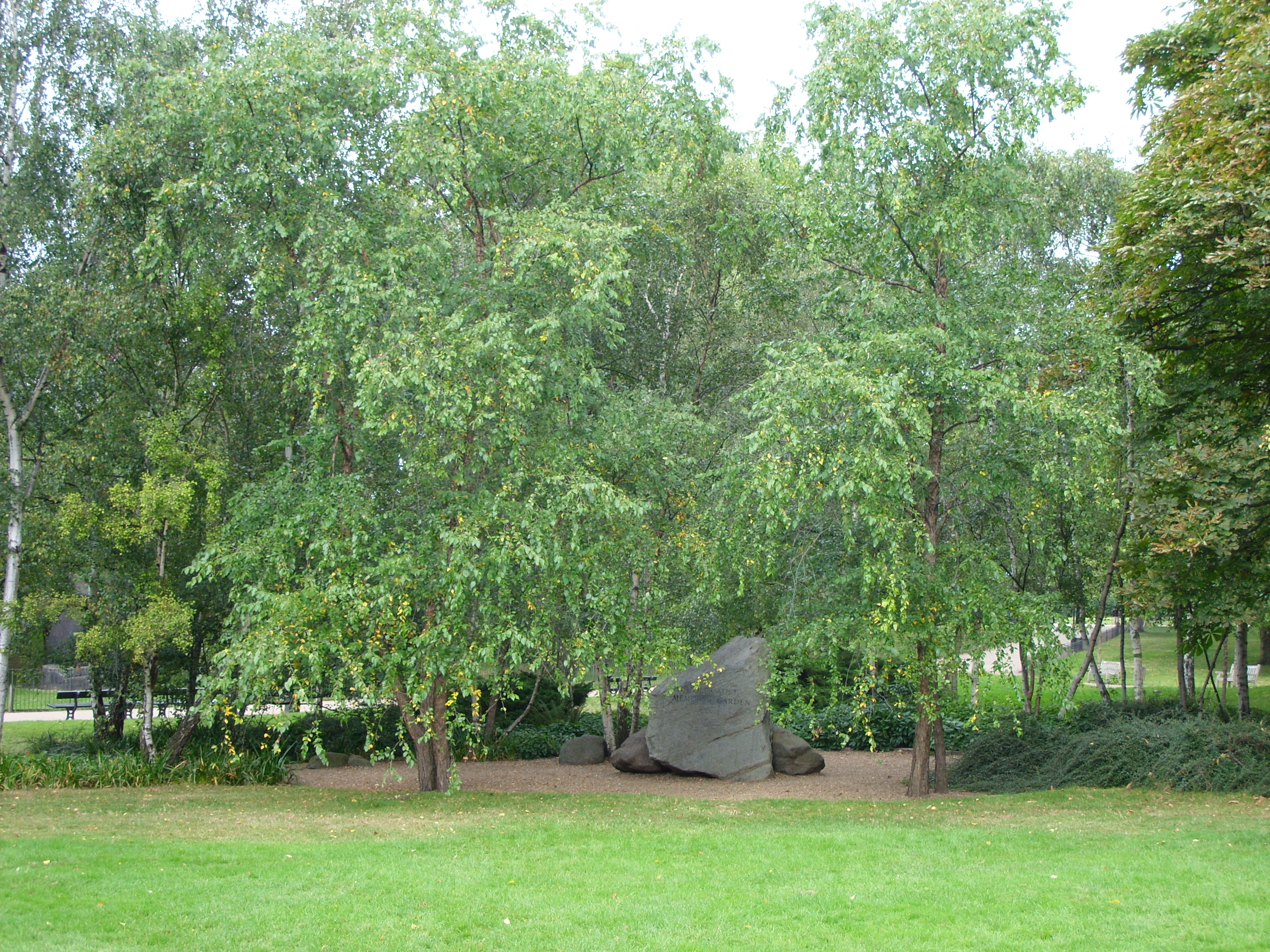
The Holocaust Memorial, immediately east of the dam

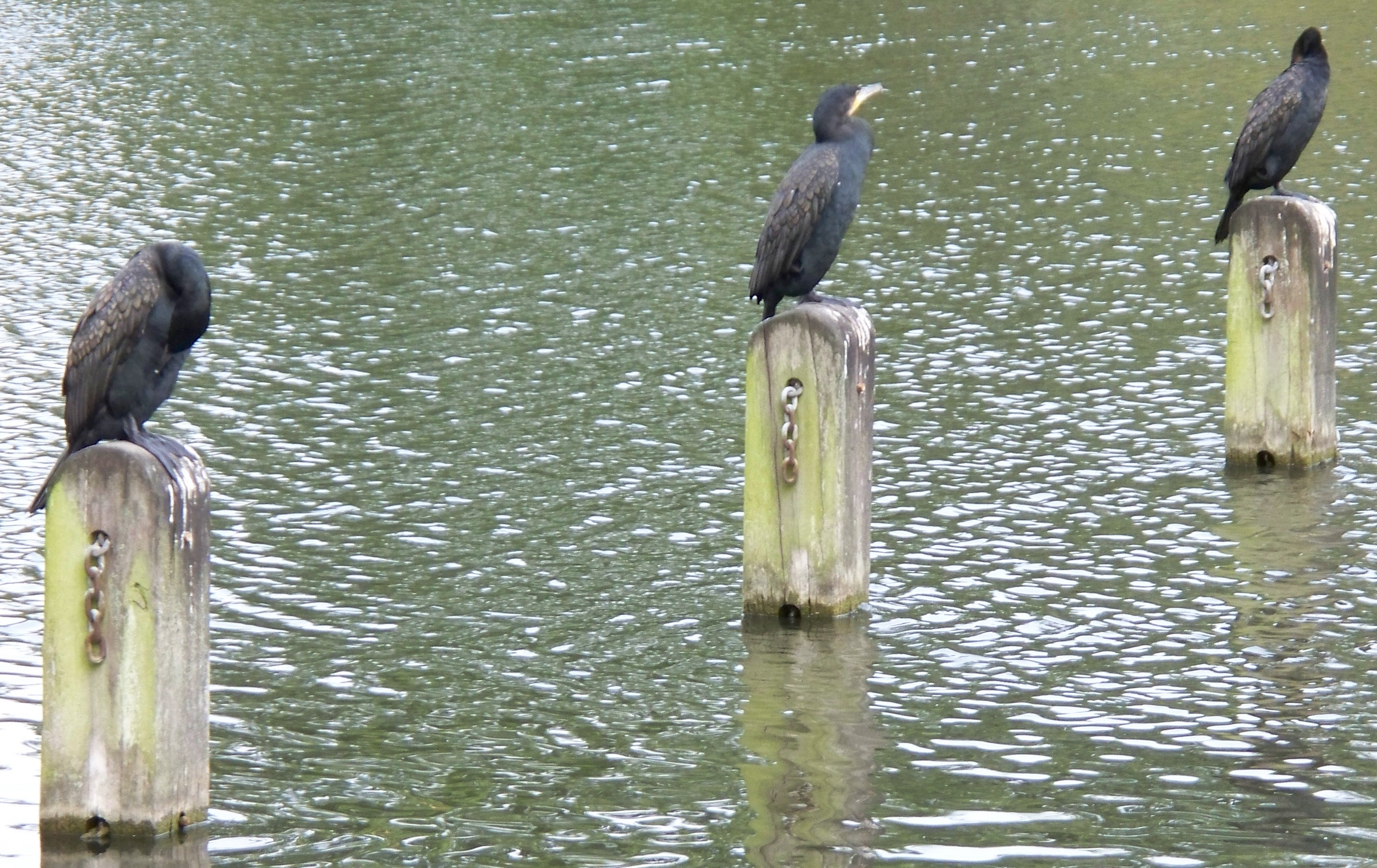
Cormorants fishing from posts in the Long Water

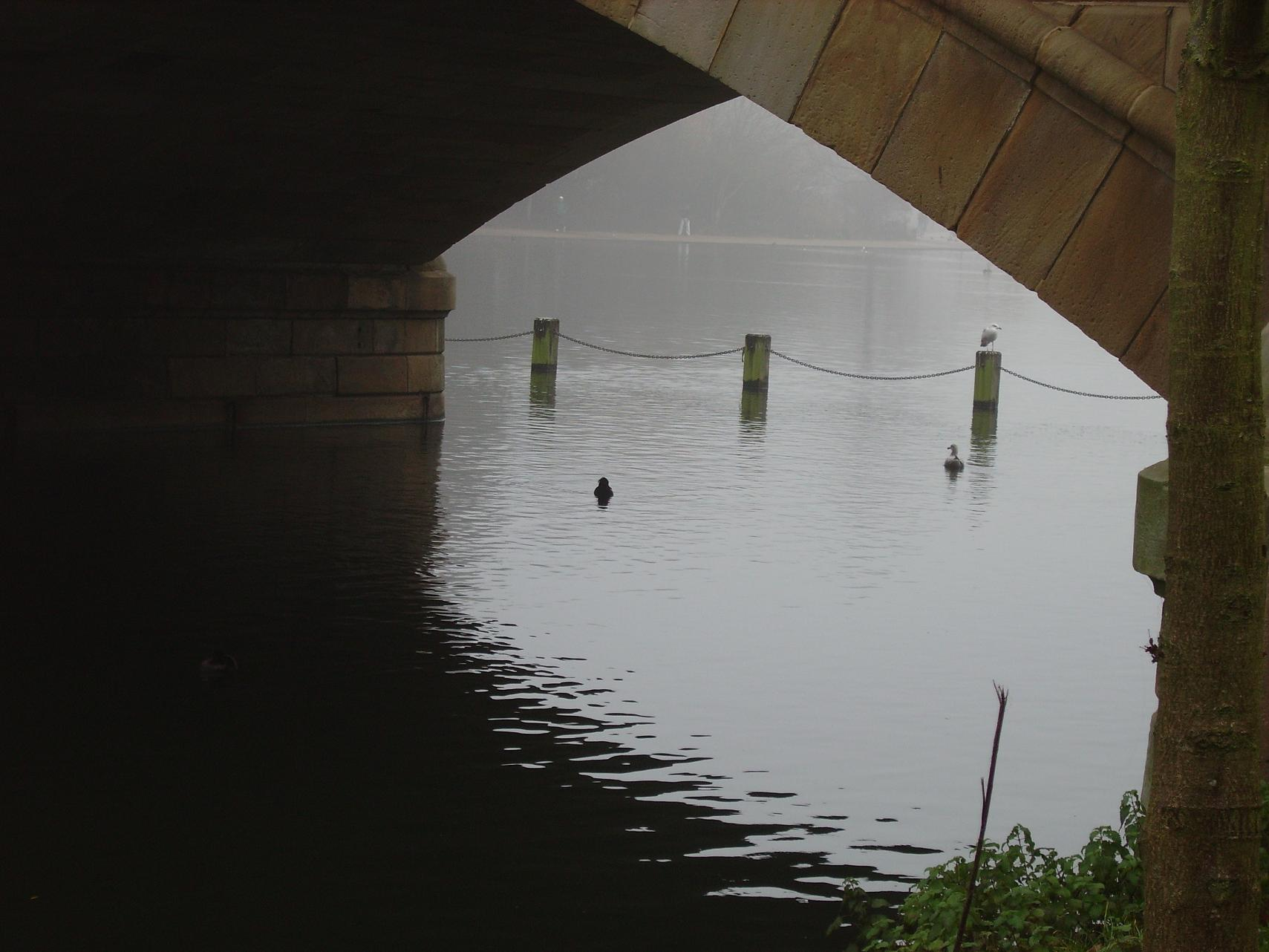
The Serpentine Bridge from below

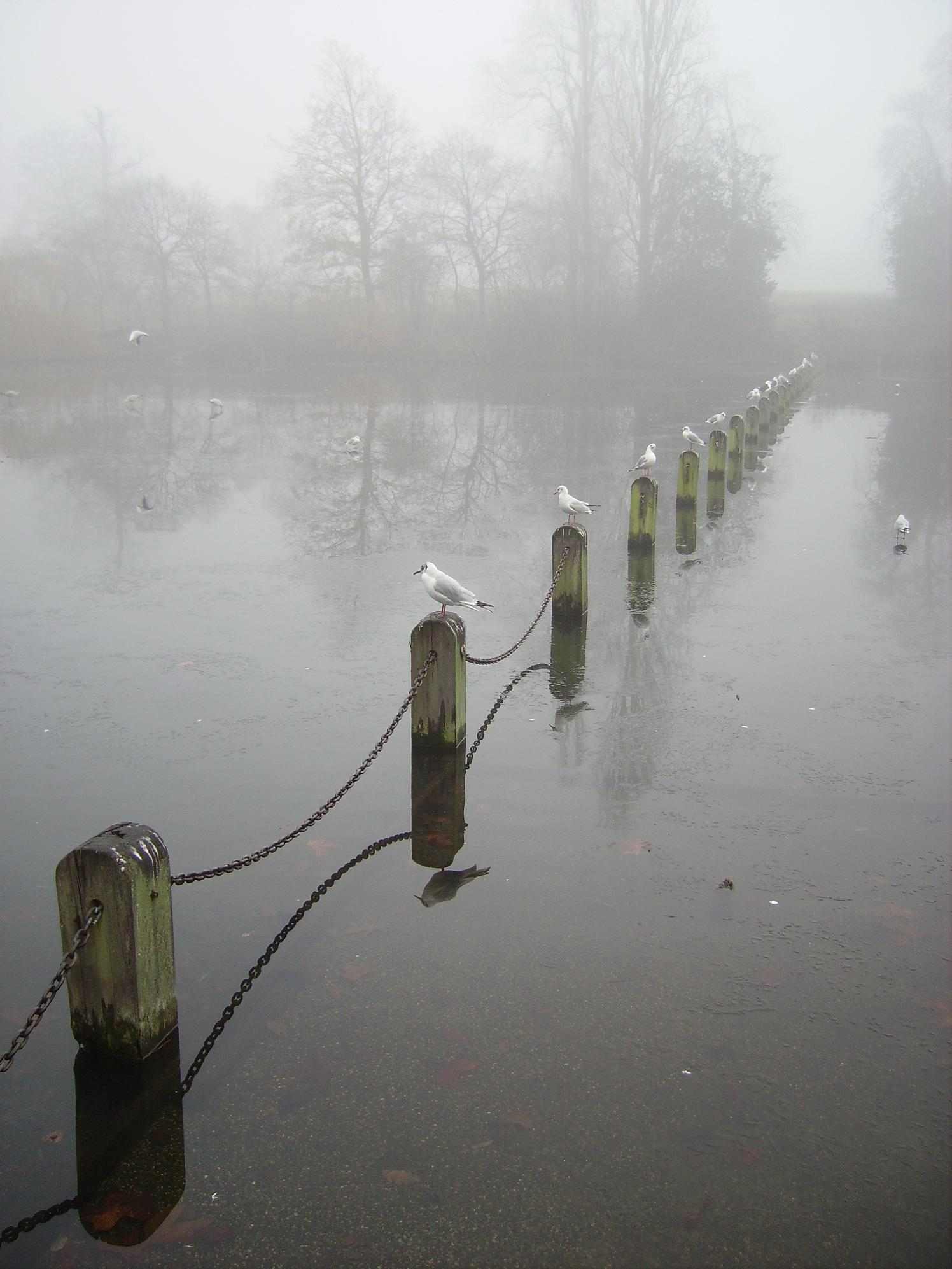
Birds sitting on poles in the Long Water

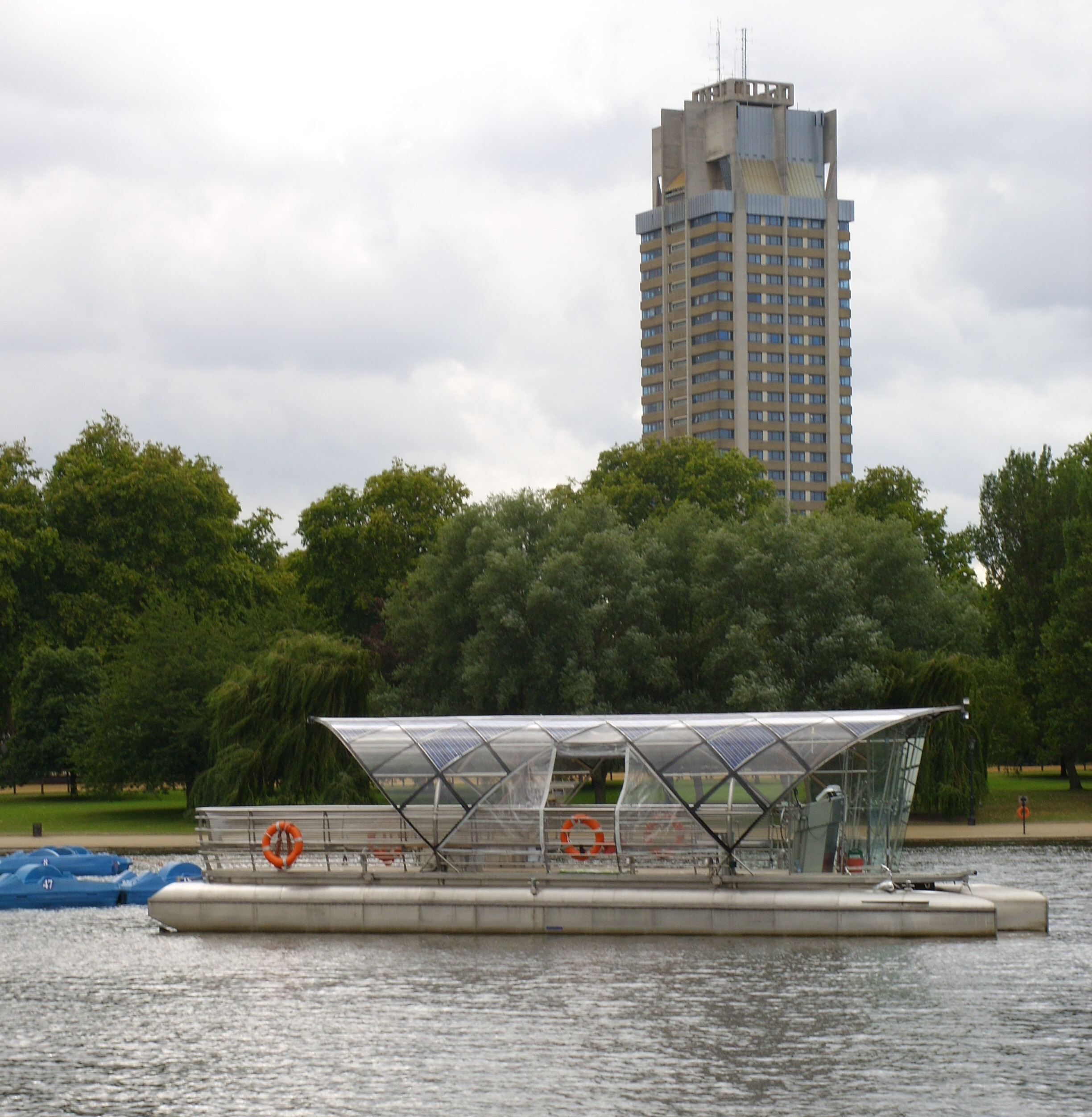
The Solarshuttle, moored in front of Hyde Park Barracks

== Bibliography ==
- Baker, Margaret (2002). Discovering London Statues and Monuments. Shire Publications. ISBN 978-0-7478-0495-6.
