= List of places in London =

This is an incomplete list of places in London, England.

== Geographic divisions and areas ==
=== Neighbourhoods ===
Aside from the City and the London boroughs themselves, all contemporary districts of London are informal designations; usually based or adapted from historic parish or borough boundaries which were all abolished by 1965. London postcode districts often have an influence over where a place is considered to be although they were not designed for that purpose. All London boroughs are divided into wards which often share the names of London districts, however, they rarely share the historic or commonly accepted contemporary boundaries of those places.

=== London boroughs ===
Greater London consists of the City of London and 32 London boroughs, of which 12 are statutory Inner London boroughs and 20 are Outer London boroughs.

London borough	Inner/Outer	Sub-region	London Assembly
Barking and Dagenham	Outer	North East	City and East
Barnet	Outer	North	Barnet and Camden
Bexley	Outer	South East	Bexley and Bromley
Brent	Outer	West	Brent and Harrow
Bromley	Outer	South East	Bexley and Bromley
Camden	Inner	North	Barnet and Camden
Croydon	Outer	South West	Croydon and Sutton
Ealing	Outer	West	Ealing and Hillingdon
Enfield	Outer	North	Enfield and Haringey
Greenwich	Inner †	South East	Greenwich and Lewisham
Hackney	Inner	North	North East
Hammersmith and Fulham	Inner	West	West Central
Haringey	Outer *	North	Enfield and Haringey
Harrow	Outer	North West	Brent and Harrow
Havering	Outer	North East	Havering and Redbridge
Hillingdon	Outer	West	Ealing and Hillingdon
Hounslow	Outer	West	South West
Islington	Inner	North	North East
Kensington and Chelsea	Inner	West	West Central
Kingston upon Thames	Outer	South West	South West
Lambeth	Inner	South West	Lambeth and Southwark
Lewisham	Inner	South East	Greenwich and Lewisham
Merton	Outer	South West	Merton and Wandsworth
Newham	Outer *	North East	City and East
Redbridge	Outer	North East	Havering and Redbridge
Richmond upon Thames	Outer	South West	South West
Southwark	Inner	South East	Lambeth and Southwark
Sutton	Outer	South West	Croydon and Sutton
Tower Hamlets	Inner	North East	City and East
Waltham Forest	Outer	North East	North East
Wandsworth	Inner	South West	Merton and Wandsworth
Westminster	Inner	West	West Central

† = Outer London for statistics | * = Inner London for statistics

=== Sub-regions ===
- North London and South London: the division of London by the River Thames
- West End of London, Central London, East End of London and the South Bank: sections of the historic urban core
- London Docklands: the historic former docks in East and Southeast London
- London Plan sub-regions: North East, North, South East, South West, West
- Various postcode areas covering London
- Public transport zones: 1 (central London); 2 (inner city); 3 and 4, (inner suburbs); 5 and 6 (outer suburbs)

== Geographic features ==
=== Hills and highest points ===
- Blackheath
- Crystal Palace
- Forest Hill
- Hampstead Hill
- Harrow Hill
- Herne Hill
- Horsendon Hill
- Ludgate Hill
- Muswell Hill
- One Tree Hill
- Parliament Hill
- Primrose Hill
- Shooters Hill
- Sydenham Hill
- Telegraph Hill, Barnet
- Telegraph Hill, Lewisham
- Tower Hill
- Tyburn Hill

=== Waterways ===
==== Canals ====
- Croydon Canal
- Grand Union Canal
- Grosvenor Canal
- Hertford Union Canal
- Limehouse Cut
- Limehouse Basin
- Paddington Basin
- Prescott Channel
- Regent's Canal
- The River Lee Navigation
- Teddington Lock
- Wenlock Basin

==== Canal tunnels ====
- Islington Tunnel
- Maida Hill Tunnel
- Eyre's tunnel

==== Docks ====
- Brentford Dock
- Canada Dock
- East India Docks
- Greenland Dock
- King George V Dock
- London Docks
- Millwall Docks
- Poplar Dock
- Regent's Canal Dock
- Russia Dock
- Royal Albert Dock
- Royal Victoria Dock
- Shadwell Basin
- South Dock
- Surrey Commercial Docks
- St Katharine Docks
- Tobacco Dock
- West India Docks

==== Islands and peninsulas ====
- Canvey Island
- Chiswick Eyot
- Isle of Grain
- Isle of Dogs
- Eel Pie Island
- Orchard Place (at the confluence of the Thames, Bow Creek and Lea)
- Three Mills Island (in the River Lea)
- Channelsea Island

==== Lakes and ponds ====
- Hampstead Ponds
- The Long Water
- Pen Ponds
- The Round Pond
- The Serpentine

==== Reservoirs ====
- Lee Valley Reservoir Chain

==== Rivers ====
- Abbey Creek
- Barking Creek
- Beverley Brook
- Bow Back Rivers
- Bow Creek
- Channelsea River
- City Mill River
- Dollis Brook
- Duke of Northumberland's River
- Folly Brook
- Hackney Brook
- Hammersmith Creek
- Hogsmill
- Longford River
- New River
- Norbury Brook
- Old River Lea
- Pool of London
- Pyl Brook
- Pymmes Brook
- River Beck
- River Brent
- River Colne, Hertfordshire
- River Crane, London
- River Cray
- River Darent
- River Ingrebourne
- River Lea (or Lee)
- River Lee Navigation
- River Moselle
- New River
- River Peck
- River Pool
- River Quaggy
- River Ravensbourne (tidal reach known as 'Deptford Creek')
- River Roding
- River Rom
- River Shuttle
- River Thames
- River Wandle
- River Westbourne
- Salmons Brook
- Stamford Brook
- Three Mills River
- Tyburn Brook
- Waterworks River
- Wogebourne
- Wyncham Stream

==== Subterranean rivers ====
- The Walbrook
- The River Fleet
- The Tyburn
- The Tyburn Brook
- The River Westbourne
- Counter's Creek
- Stamford Brook
- The River Neckinger
- The River Effra

=== Open spaces ===
==== Cemeteries ====
- Abney Park Cemetery
- Brockley and Ladywell Cemeteries
- Brompton Cemetery
- East Finchley Cemetery
- Highgate Cemetery
- Kensal Green Cemetery
- Nunhead Cemetery
- Putney Vale Cemetery
- Tower Hamlets Cemetery
- West Norwood Cemetery

==== Parks, gardens, and commons ====
- Alexandra Park
- Barking Park
- Battersea Park
- Barnes Common
- Beddington Park
- Boston Manor Park
- Brockwell Park
- Broomfield Park
- Burgess Park
- Calthorpe Project
- Camley Street Natural Park
- Chelsea Physic Garden
- Chiswick House Grounds
- Clapham Common
- Clissold Park
- Coombe Wood House Gardens
- Crystal Palace Park
- Danson Park, Bexleyheath
- Down Lane Park, Tottenham
- Dulwich Park
- Duppas Hill
- Ealing Common
- Elsinge Green, Enfield
- Eltham Common
- Fairfield Park, Croydon
- Finsbury Park
- Foots Cray Meadows
- Furnivall Gardens
- Gladstone Park
- Goodmayes Park
- Greenwich Peninsula Ecology Park, formerly Greenwich Marsh
- Grovelands Park
- Gunnersbury Park
- Gwendwr Garden
- Hackney Downs
- Ham Common
- Ham House Gardens
- Hammersmith Park
- Hampstead Heath
- Hampton Court Gardens
- Hanworth Park
- Harrow Lodge Park
- Hillingdon Court Park
- Holland Park
- Horniman Gardens
- Hounslow Heath
- Inwood Park
- Island Gardens
- Islington Green
- Jubilee Gardens, Barnes
- Jubilee Gardens, South Bank
- Jubilee Gardens, Twickenham
- Kennington Park
- Kenwood
- Kew Gardens
- Kew Green
- King's Stairs Gardens
- Ladbroke Estate Gardens
- Lamorbey Park
- Lammas Park, Ealing
- Larkhall Park
- Lincoln's Inn Fields
- London Fields
- London Wetland Centre
- Lyle Park
- Mayesbrook Park
- Marble Hill Park
- McDermott Park
- Mile End Children's Park
- Mitcham Common
- Morden Park
- Mount Street Gardens
- Museum of Garden History
- Myatt's Fields Park
- Newlands Park, Barking
- Norwood Park
- One Tree Hill
- Osterley Park
- Paradise Park, Holloway
- Park Hill, Croydon
- Parsloes Park
- Parsons Green
- Peckham Rye
- Peckham Rye Common
- Phoenix Garden
- Pierhead Lock
- Postman's Park
- Potter's Fields Close
- Primrose Hill
- Priory Park, Haringey
- Putney Common
- Putney Heath
- Pymmes Park
- Queen's Gardens
- Queen's Park
- Queen's Wood
- Radnor Gardens
- Railway Fields LNR
- Raphael Park
- Ravenscourt Park
- Red Cross Garden
- Richmond Green
- Richmond Hill
- Riverwalk Gardens
- Russia Dock Woodland
- Ruskin Park
- Shoreditch Park
- Sayes Court Park
- Seven Kings Park
- Sir John McDougal Gardens
- South Norwood Country Park
- Southwark Park
- Spa Park
- Springfield Park
- St. John's Churchyard, Waterloo
- Strawberry Hill
- Streatham Common
- Sutcliffe Park
- Syon Park
- Telegraph Hill Park
- Thames Barrier Park
- Tooting Bec Common
- Tooting Graveney Common
- Trent Park
- Turnham Green
- V&A Garden
- Valence Park
- Valentines Park
- Vauxhall Park
- Victoria Park
- Victoria Tower Gardens
- Violet Hill Gardens
- Walpole Park
- Wandle Park, Croydon
- Wandsworth Common
- Wandsworth Park
- Wanstead Park
- Wapping Recreation Ground
- Waterlow Park
- Weavers Field
- Wells Park
- West Ham Park
- Westow Park
- Wimbledon Common
- Wimbledon Park

==== Remnants of ancient woodlands ====
- Bayhurst Wood
- Coldfall Wood
- Copse Wood
- Dulwich Wood
- Epping Forest
- Hainault Forest
- Highgate Wood
- Kenwood
- Mad Bess Wood
- Oxleas Wood
- Park Wood
- Queen's Wood
- Sydenham Hill Wood

==== Royal Parks ====
- Brompton Cemetery
- Bushy Park
- Green Park
- Greenwich Park
- Hampton Court Park
- Hyde Park
- Kensington Gardens
- Regent's Park
- Richmond Park
- St. James's Park

==== Urban farms ====
- Deen City Farm
- Freightliners City Farm
- Hackney City Farm
- Hounslow Urban Farm
- Kentish Town City Farm
- Lee Valley Park Farms
- Mudchute Park and Farm
- Spitalfields City Farm
- Stepney City Farm
- Surrey Docks Farm
- Woodlands Farm
- Woollett Hall Farm
- Vauxhall City Farm

== Buildings and structures ==
=== Airports ===
- London Biggin Hill Airport
- London City Airport
- London Gatwick Airport
- London Heathrow Airport
- London Southend Airport
- Stansted Airport
- Northolt Aerodrome
- London Heliport (Battersea)
- Hayes Heliport
- Croydon Airport
- Kenley Aerodrome

=== Bridges ===
- Albert Bridge
- Battersea Bridge
- Blackfriars Bridge
- Chelsea Bridge
- Hammersmith Bridge
- Hungerford Bridge
- Kew Bridge
- Kingston Bridge
- Lambeth Bridge
- London Bridge
- Putney Bridge
- Richmond Bridge
- Southwark Bridge
- Tower Bridge
- Vauxhall Bridge
- Waterloo Bridge
- Westminster Bridge

=== Cathedrals and places of worship ===
- Westminster Abbey
- St Paul's Cathedral
- Regent's Park Mosque
- Westminster Cathedral
- St Martin-in-the-Fields
- Central Hall, Westminster
- Southwark Cathedral
- St Mary-le-Bow
- Neasden Temple
- St Sophia's Cathedral
- Temple Church
- Bevis Marks Synagogue
- Central Mosque Wembley
- Gurdwara Sri Guru Singh Sabha
- Brompton Oratory
- Peace Pagoda
- All Hallows-by-the-Tower

=== Government and parliamentary buildings ===
- 10 Downing Street
- 11 Downing Street
- 12 Downing Street
- 2 Marsham Street
- 50 Queen Anne's Gate
- Admiralty Arch
- Admiralty House
- Elizabeth Tower ("Big Ben")
- Cumberland House
- Dover House
- Eland House
- Horse Guards
- Hyde Park Barracks
- Lancaster House
- Lunar House
- Marsham Towers
- Middlesex Guildhall
- Norman Shaw Buildings
- Palace of Westminster
- Portcullis House
- Royal Arsenal
- Royal Artillery Barracks
- Royal Courts of Justice
- Ruskin House
- SIS Building
- Schomberg House
- Skipton House
- Somerset House
- St Stephen's Chapel
- Taberner House
- Thames House
- Trinity House
- Victoria Tower
- War Office
- Wellington Barracks

=== Houses and palaces ===
- Apsley House
- Bruce Castle
- Buckingham Palace
- Chiswick House
- Danson House
- Down House
- Eastbury Manor House
- Eltham Palace
- Forty Hall
- Fulham Palace
- Guildhall
- Grim's Dyke
- Hall Place
- Hampton Court Palace
- Ham House
- Kensington Palace
- Kenwood House
- Kew Palace
- Lambeth Palace
- Leighton House
- Little Holland House
- Mansion House
- Marble Hill House
- Osterley Park House
- Palace of Westminster
- Pitzhanger Manor
- Red House, several places
- Saint James's Palace
- Spencer House
- Swakeleys House
- Syon House
- Valence House
- Valentine's Mansion
- The Wick

=== Legal London ===
- Central Criminal Court (the Old Bailey)
- Royal Courts of Justice

==== Inns of Court ====
- Gray's Inn
- Inner Temple
- Lincoln's Inn
- Middle Temple

=== Markets ===
==== Former markets ====
- Clare Market
- Hungerford Market
- Old Billingsgate Market
- Romford Market

==== Covered markets ====
- Borough Market
- Greenwich Market
- Leadenhall Market
- Old Spitalfields market

==== Street markets ====
- Bermondsey Market
- Berwick Street Market
- Brick Lane Market
- Brixton Market
- Broadway Market
- Camden Market
  - Buck Street Market
  - Camden Canal Market
  - Camden Lock Market
  - Inverness Street Market
  - Stables Market
- Camden Passage
- Chapel Market
- Chrisp Street Market
- Columbia Road Market
- Deptford Market
- Earlham Street Market
- East Street Market
- Hoxton Market
- Queens Road Market
- Queen's Crescent Market
- Leather Lane Market
- Lower Marsh Market
- Nag's Head Market
- Petticoat Lane Market
- Portobello Road Market
- Ridley Road Market
- Romford Market
- Southall Market
- Surrey Street Market
- Walthamstow Market
- Watney Market
- Wembley Market
- Whitecross Street Market

==== Trade markets ====
- Billingsgate Fish Market
- New Covent Garden Market
- Smithfield Meat Market
- New Spitalfields Market

=== Museums and art galleries ===
- British Museum
- British Library
- Horniman Museum
- Imperial War Museum
- London Museum of Water & Steam
- London Transport Museum
- Madame Tussaud's
- Museum of London
- National Army Museum
- National Gallery
- National Maritime Museum
- National Portrait Gallery
- Natural History Museum
- Orleans House Gallery
- The Royal Air Force Museum London
- Royal Academy of Arts
- Science Museum
- Sir John Soane's Museum
- Somerset House - contains three museums
- Syon House
- Tate Britain
- Tate Modern
- Tower of London
- Victoria & Albert Museum
- Wallace Collection

=== Railway stations ===
- City Thameslink
- London Blackfriars
- London Bridge
- London Cannon Street
- London Charing Cross
- London Euston
- London Fenchurch Street
- London Kings Cross
- London Liverpool Street
- London Marylebone
- London Paddington
- London St Pancras International
- London Victoria
- London Waterloo
- London Waterloo East
- Moorgate Underground
- Old Street Underground
- Stratford
- Vauxhall
- Surbiton
- Wimbledon
- Richmond

=== Roadways ===
==== Footpaths ====
- Capital Ring
- Green Chain
- London Outer Orbital Path
- Thames Path

==== Major roads ====
- M1 motorway
- M25 motorway
- M3 motorway
- M4 motorway
- M11 motorway
- North Circular Road (A406)
- South Circular Road (A205)
- The London Inner Ring Road

==== Roman roads ====
- Ermine Street
- Oxford Street
- Watling Street

==== Streets and squares ====
- Abbey Road
- Abbotsbury Road
- Addison Avenue
- Addison Road
- Albany Street
- Albemarle Street
- Aldwych
- Baker Street
- Baylis Road
- Bayswater Road
- Berkeley Square
- Birdcage Walk
- Blackfriars Road
- Bond Street (Old and New)
- Brompton Road
- Cannon Street
- Chancery Lane
- Charing Cross Road
- Cheapside
- Chepstow Place
- Commercial Road
- Connaught Square
- Constitution Hill
- Coventry Street
- Cromwell Road
- Curzon Street
- Dover Street
- Downing Street
- Edgware Road
- Electric Avenue
- Euston Road
- Exhibition Road
- Fleet Street
- Gipsy Hill
- Gloucester Road
- Gray's Inn Road
- Gresham Street
- Grosvenor Square
- Haymarket
- Harley Street
- High Holborn
- Hill Street
- Holland Park Avenue
- Holland Park Road
- Horse Guards Parade
- Horse Guards Road
- Hyde Park Gate
- Ilchester Place
- Imperial College Road
- Jermyn Street
- Kensington High Street
- Kensington Road
- King William Street
- The King's Road
- Kingsway
- Ladbroke Grove
- Leicester Square
- Lincoln's Inn Fields
- Lombard Street
- Long Acre
- The Mall
- Marylebone Road
- Melbury Road
- Millbank
- Moscow Road
- Northumberland Avenue
- Notting Hill Gate
- Old Brompton Road
- Old Compton Street
- Ossington Street
- Oxford Street
- Palace Gate
- Pall Mall
- Park Lane
- Parliament Square
- Piccadilly
- Piccadilly Circus
- Portland Place
- Portobello Road
- Purley Way
- Queen Victoria Street
- Queen's Gate
- Queensway
- Regent Street
- Richmond Hill
- Royal Crescent
- Russell Square
- Savile Row
- Shaftesbury Avenue
- Sloane Square
- Sloane Street
- The Strand
- St James's Street
- St Petersburgh Place
- Talgarth Road
- The Cut
- Threadneedle Street
- Tottenham Court Road
- Trafalgar Square
- Victoria Embankment
- Wardour Street
- Waterloo Road
- Westbourne Grove
- Westminster Bridge Road
- Whitehall
- York Road

=== Ruins ===
- Barking Abbey
- London Wall
- Lesnes Abbey

=== Shopping arcades ===
- Burlington Arcade
- Piccadilly Arcade

=== Sporting venues ===
- All England Lawn Tennis and Croquet Club (Wimbledon)
- Craven Cottage
- The Den
- Emirates Stadium
- Herne Hill Velodrome
- Lord's Cricket Ground
- Olympic Stadium
- The Oval
- Selhurst Park
- Stamford Bridge
- Tottenham Hotspur Stadium
- Twickenham Stadium
- The Valley
- Vicarage Road
- Wembley Stadium
- White Hart Lane

=== Theatres and concert halls ===
- Albert Hall
- Alexandra Palace
- Royal National Theatre
- Royal Festival Hall
- South Bank Centre

=== Tourist attractions ===
- The London Bridge Experience
- London Dungeon
- London Eye

==== Former tourist attractions ====
- Millennium Dome
- The Crystal Palace
- Pre-2000 Wembley Stadium

=== Windmills ===
- Ashby's Mill
- Barnet Gate Mill
- Keston Windmill
- Plumstead Common Windmill
- Shirley Windmill
- Upminster Windmill
- Wandsworth Common Windmill
- Wimbledon Windmill

== See also ==
- List of garden squares in London
- List of places in England
- Category:Geography of London
