= Nag's Head, London =

Coordinates: 51.557°N 0.117°W

Nag's Head
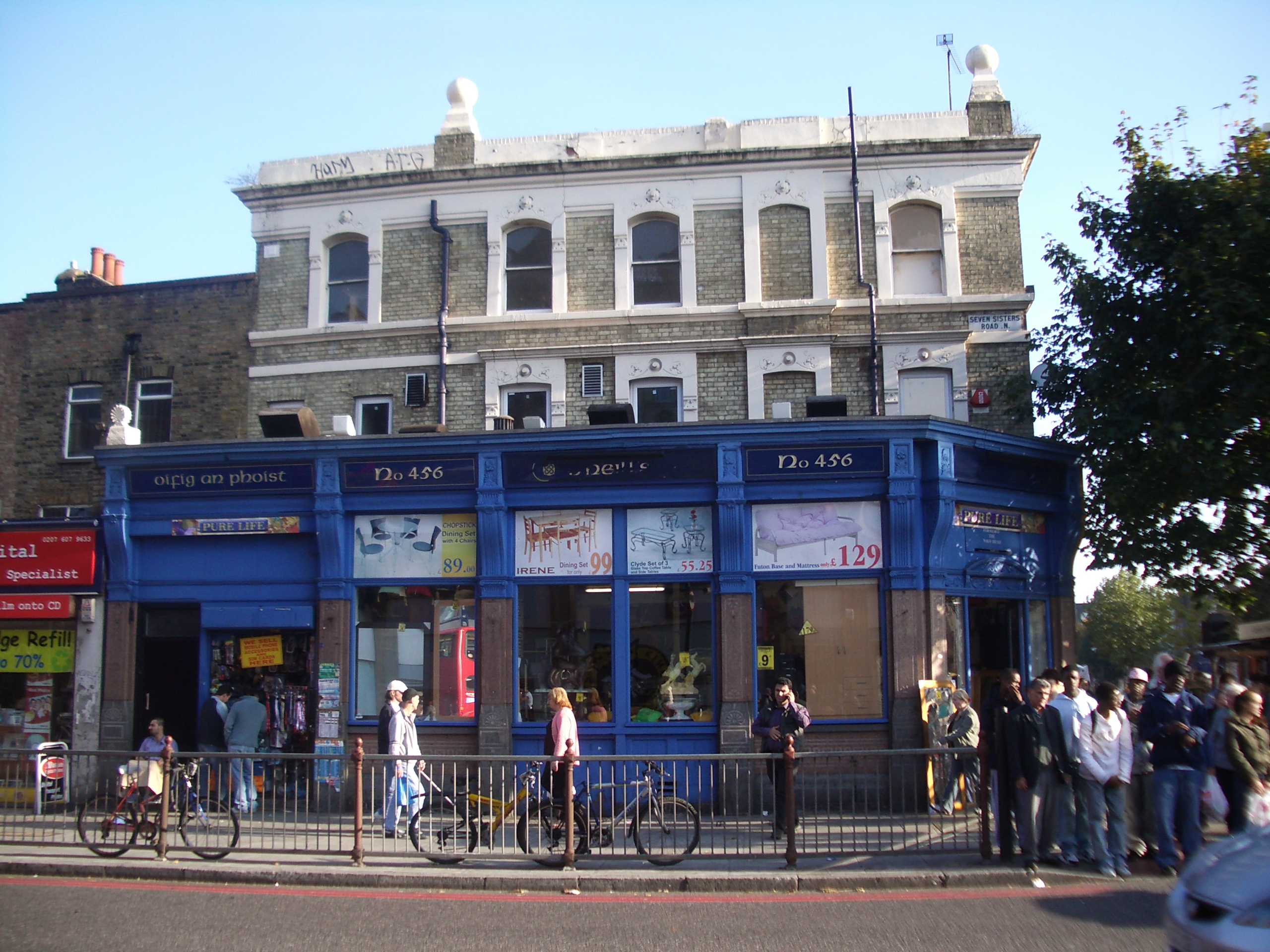
- The former Nags Head pub on Holloway Road, from which the area takes its name

- Location within Greater London
- OS grid reference: TQ305859
  - Charing Cross: 3.5 mi (5.6 km) S
- London borough: Islington
- Ceremonial county: Greater London
- Region: London
- Country: England
- Sovereign state: United Kingdom
- Post town: LONDON
- Postcode district: N7
- Dialling code: 020
- Police: Metropolitan
- Fire: London
- Ambulance: London
- London Assembly: North East

Nag's Head is a locality within the Holloway area of the London Borough of Islington.

== Toponymy ==
The area is named after the Nag's Head public house, an early Victorian building, in use as a gambling/gaming shop under another name. The pub, also called the Mustang Diner and O'Neills, ceased pub or bar use in 2004.

== Shopping arcade ==
Nag's Head Town Centre is a shopping arcade between a supermarket and Selby's, and it is governed by the Nag's Head Town Centre Management Group.

== Geography ==
The name most narrowly refers to the Nag's Head junction of Holloway Road (the A1) with Seven Sisters Road, where the eponymous building stands. The London Plan confirms its attachment to all surrounding streets, particularly the stretch of Holloway Road between the former pub and Camden Road.

== Retail and property development ==
The area is identified in the London Plan as one of 35 major centres in Greater London. The shopping and entertainment area includes the Nag's Head Market (behind Holloway Road on the northwest corner of Hertslet Road) and the Nag's Head Shopping Centre. Nags Head hosts Selby's, its department store, part of Morleys Stores.
