= Tyburn (disambiguation) =

Tyburn may refer to the following places in England:

London

- River Tyburn, a former tributary of the Thames, now a sewer
- Tyburn Brook, a different river about a mile further west, a tributary of the River Westbourne
- Tyburn, Middlesex, a manor house and former village located near the brook
- Tyburn Road, a former name for Oxford Street, which passed in front of the manor
- the Tyburn Tree, once a large gallows about 200 m west of Marble Arch

Others

- Tyburn, West Midlands, an electoral ward in Birmingham
- York's Tyburn
