= Abbey Creek =

River in the London Borough of Newham

Coordinates: 51.52854°N 0.0004°W

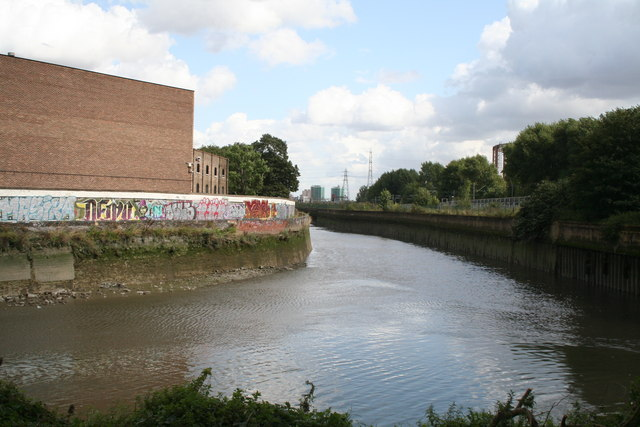
Abbey Creek

Abbey Creek is a tidal river channel of the River Lea in London. It runs on the opposite side of Channelsea Island to the Channelsea River.

== See also ==
- Bow Back Rivers
