= River Westbourne =

River in London, England

Coordinates: 51.4850°N 0.1538°W

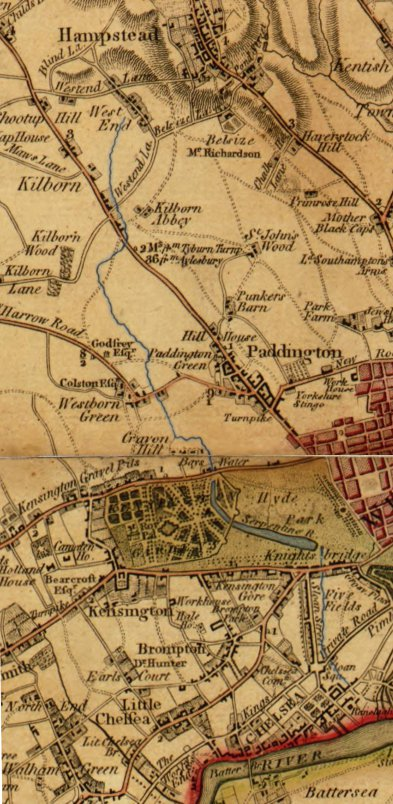
Route of the River Westbourne (highlighted in blue) shown between West End (now known as West Hampstead) and the Thames on a map from 1790

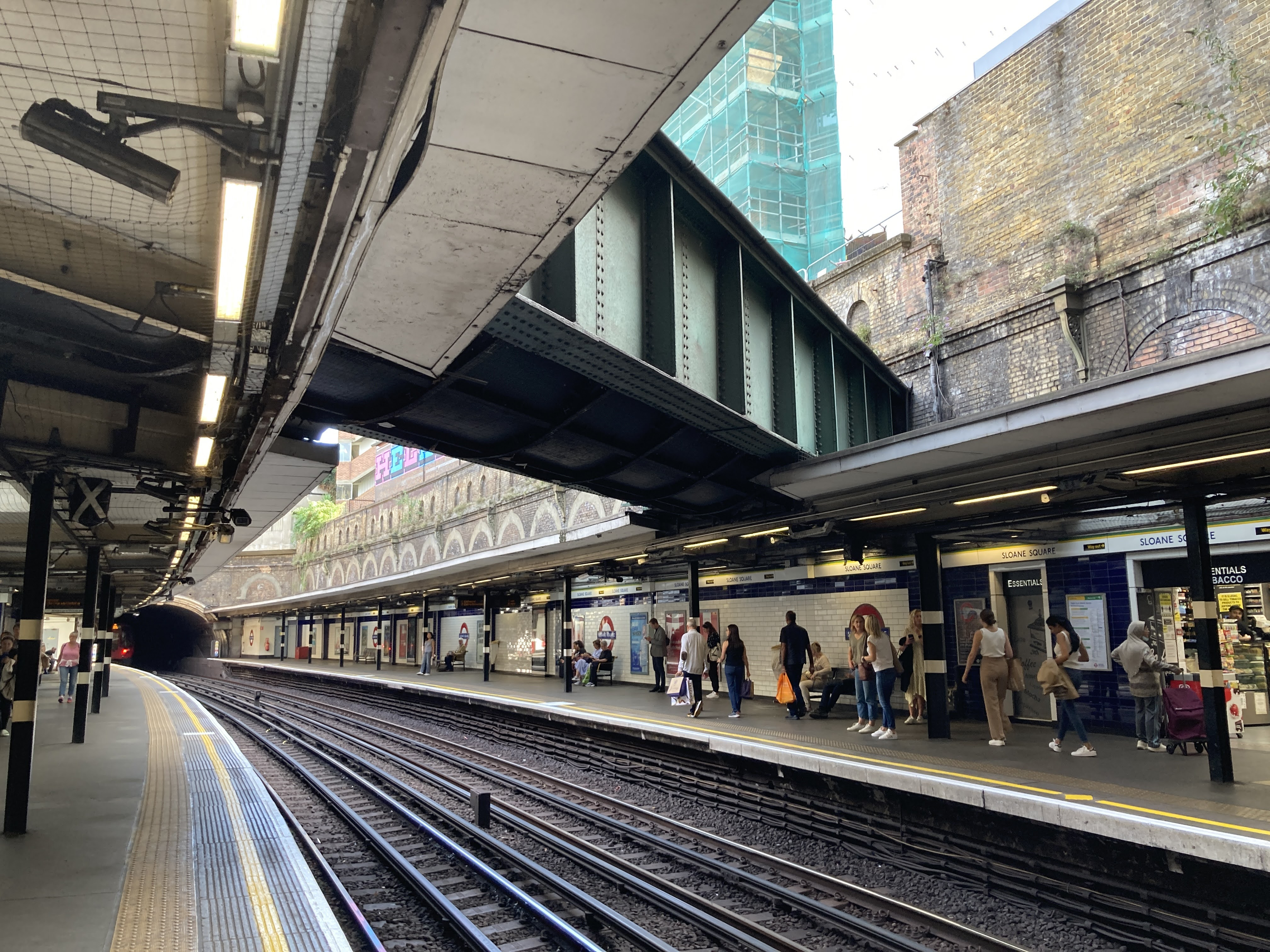
The River Westbourne running above the platforms of Sloane Square tube station

The Westbourne or Kilburn, also known as the Ranelagh Sewer, is a culverted small River Thames tributary in London, rising in Hampstead and Brondesbury Park and which as a drain unites and flows southward through Kilburn and Bayswater (west end of Paddington) to skirt underneath the east of Hyde Park's Serpentine lake then through central Chelsea under Sloane Square. It passes centrally under the south side of Royal Hospital Chelsea's Ranelagh Gardens before discharging into Inner London's combined sewer system, with exceptional discharges (to be abated by a 2021-completion scheme) into the Inner London Tideway. Since the latter 19th century, the population of its catchment has risen further but to reduce the toll it places on the Beckton Sewage Treatment Works and related bills its narrow basin has been assisted by private soakaways, and public surface water drains. Its depression has been replaced with and adopted as a reliable route for a gravity combined sewer. The formation of the Serpentine relied on the water, a lake with a long, ornate footbridge and various activities associated, which today uses little-polluted water from a great depth.

== Names ==
The river was originally called the Kilburn (Cye Bourne – royal stream, 'Bourne and burn' being the Germanic word equivalent to rivulet as in the geographical term 'winterbourne') but has been known, at different times and in different places, as Kelebourne, Kilburn, Bayswater, Bayswater River, Bayswater Rivulet, Serpentine River, The Bourne, Westburn Brook, the Ranelagh River and the Ranelagh Sewer. It is of similar size to the Fleet.

== Course ==
Rising from several sources in Hampstead, and Brondesbury Park, the river or drain flows south through Kilburn (also the name of the river at that point) running west along Kilburn Park Road and then south along Shirland Road. After crossing Bishops Bridge Road, the river continued more or less due south, between what is now Craven Terrace and what is now Gloucester Terrace. At this point, the river was known until the early 19th century as the Bayswater rivulet and from that it gave its name to the area now known as Bayswater. Originally Bayswater was the stretch of the stream where it crosses Bayswater Road, "Bayards Watering" in 1652 and "Bayards Watering Place" in 1654. It is said that there is a reference to Bayards Watering Place as early as 1380. There were a few houses at this spot in the eighteenth century and, it seems, a man called Bayard used or offered it as a watering place for horses on this road (formerly Uxbridge Road). The river entered Hyde Park at what is now the Serpentine and is within the park joined by a tributary, Tyburn Brook. The Serpentine was formed in 1730 by building a dam across the Westbourne at the instigation of Queen Caroline, wife of George II, to beautify the royal park. The Westbourne ceased to provide the water for the Serpentine in 1834, as the culverted Westbourne had become the most convenient main sewer and the Serpentine is now supplied from three boreholes from the upper chalk underneath Hyde Park. The Serpentine was widely imitated in parks and gardens nationwide.

The Westbourne left Hyde Park (both before and after it had been dammed to form the Serpentine) at Knightsbridge which was originally a bridge over the Westbourne itself. It is recorded that, in the year 1141, the citizens of London met Matilda of England (Queen Maud) at this bridge. The river ran from Knightsbridge south under Bourne Street, SW1 and followed very closely the boundary between the City of Westminster and the Royal Borough of Kensington and Chelsea, (Note: Its lower course is nearby the Westminster/Chelsea & Kensington borough boundary (the meandering purple line down the middle of this map)) joining the River Thames at Chelsea.

The waters of the Westbourne or Bayswater were originally pure and in 1437 and 1439 conduits were laid to carry water from the Westbourne into the City of London, for drinking. In the 19th century, however, the water became foul by its use as a sewer, and the rise of the water closet as the prevailing form of sanitation.

When west Belgravia, east Chelsea and Paddington were developed, it was becoming obvious the river would have to remain a combined or foul sewer, with a certain storm element until such time as surface water drains (if ever) were built upstream. Pipes were therefore wrought in the early part of the 19th century with larger successors completed in the 1850s. The Westbourne is one of the lost rivers of London.

The storm drain, combined sewer, pipe of the lower course can still be seen running above the platform of Sloane Square tube station. Made, in the 19th century, of riveted sections it is below the ceiling towards the end of the platforms closest to the exits. The station was badly bombed during the Bombing of London in November 1940 but the pipe was not damaged.

After flowing beneath the eastern lands of the Royal Military Hospital Gardens and beneath a corner of Chelsea Barracks, the drain was in all but exceptional storms entirely designed to be received by the Joseph Bazalgette-designed Northern Low Level Sewer. As some of its foul content overwhelms the system with further inflows from the west, an improvement, the Thames Tideway Scheme tunnel will enable that sewer to continue to cope.

A clearance in sand against the tideway is about 300 yards (270 m) west of Chelsea Bridge. An emergency combined sewer overflow also called the Ranelagh Sewer, is obvious except at high tide. The combined sewer aims to be caught only by two intercept sewers capable of its flow, the Middle Level Sewer and the Northern Low Level Sewer in the London sewerage system.

== Maps ==
The finest and most intelligible map of the whole course of the Westbourne, superimposed over the Victorian street plan, is found in an article by J. G. Waller, published in the Transactions of the London and Middlesex Archaeological Society, vol VI (1882) pp 272–279.

Waller's map shows that the stream never ran further west than the easternmost extremity of Westbourne Grove, Notting Hill (an east–west road ending at Queensway where the course lay). Westbourne Grove is, as its name suggests, west of the bourne.

== See also ==
- Subterranean rivers of London
- List of rivers in England

== Notes and references ==
Notes

Next confluence upstream	River Thames	Next confluence downstream
Counter's Creek (north)	River Westbourne	Tyburn (stream)
