= Channelsea River =

Tidal creek in East London

Coordinates: 51°31′39″N 0°00′05″W

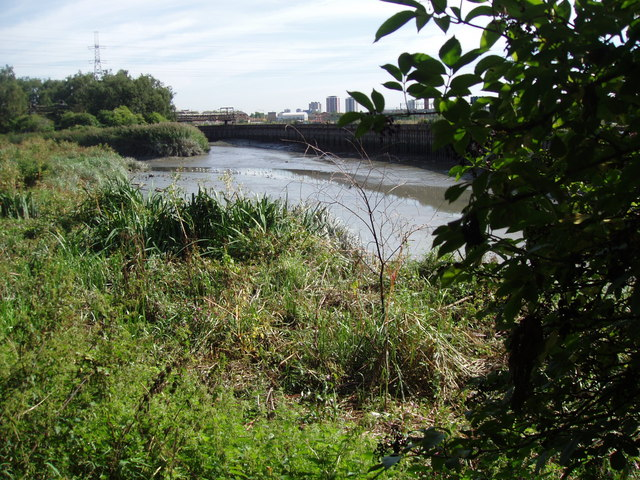
Channelsea River near Mill Meads in 2005

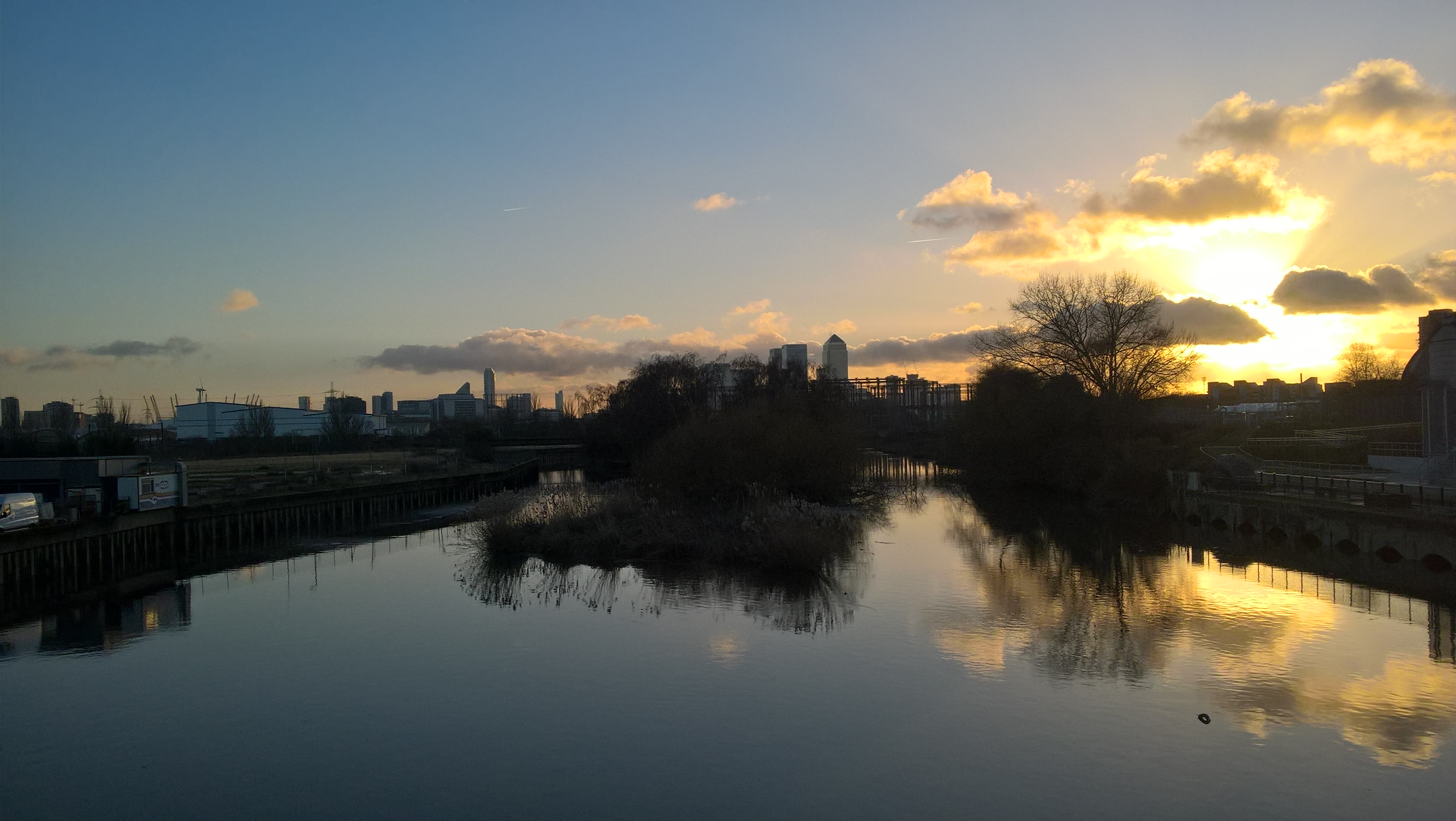
Channelsea River, pictured in 2017, showing Channelsea Island in the centre of the river

Channelsea River is a tidal river in London, England, one of the Bow Back Rivers that flow into the Bow Creek part of the River Lea, which in turn flows into the River Thames.

In 1957–8, the Channelsea River was culverted between Stratford High Street and Lett Road.

In 1994, the historian Dan Cruickshank found 4,000 tons (60%) of the lost Euston Arch buried in the bed of the River Lea at the Channelsea River and the Prescott Channel.

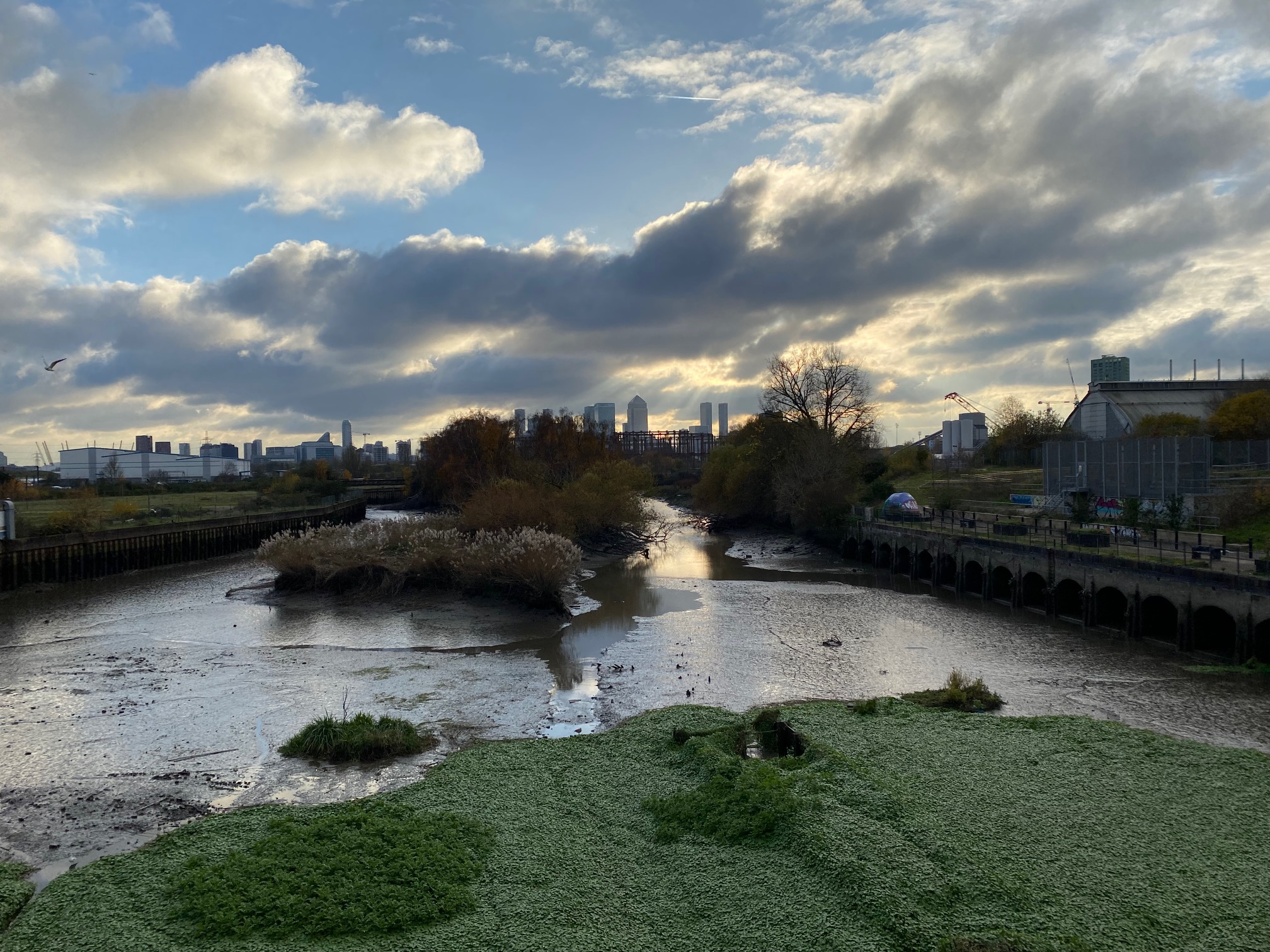
Looking south along the Channelsea River (left) and Abbey Creek (right) towards Canary Wharf from the Greenway, with Channelsea Island in the background

Channelsea Island is in this river.

== See also ==
- Rivers of the United Kingdom
