= Watney Market =

English outdoor street market

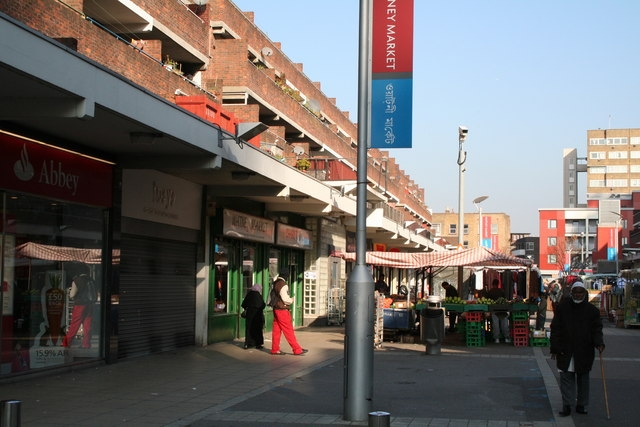
- Watney Market (from Commercial Road)
- Location: Watney Street, Shadwell, London E1 2PR; Shadwell
- Opening date: 1881
- Management: Tower Hamlets Market Services
- Owner: Tower Hamlets London Borough Council
- Goods sold: General goods
- Days normally open: Monday to Saturday (8.30am to 6pm)

Watney Market is an outdoor street market in London, England. The market is situated on the pedestrianised northern portion of Watney Street, which connects Commercial Road and Shadwell DLR station. Located between Whitechapel and Shadwell, the market operates Monday to Saturday, 8.30am to 6pm, with vendors selling a variety of goods. Alongside market stalls, a number of permanent stores also operate in the area.

== History ==
In 1881, John James Sainsbury purchased 68 Watney Street to expand the retail business he began in 1869 (now known as UK supermarket chain Sainsbury's). The property was acquired from his brother-in-law, Edward Staples, who was already operating it as a food store for dockers based in the East End of London.

At this time, shopkeeper Mike Drummond was already successfully operating in the area at 67 Watney Street, gathering a loyal customer base, particularly amongst fellow Irish immigrants. Following years of fierce competition between the two store owners, Sainsbury bought 67 Watney Street in 1894 after Drummond's retirement.

By 1902, there were over 100 shops and 100 stalls in the market and this more than doubled after the First World War. In the 1920s, space to trade on the street was in high demand with records showing that 1927 saw 227 traders applying for the 200 available pitches in the area.

Watney Street's trading community continued to thrive until the outbreak of the Second World War in 1939. Following nationwide economic hardship, rationing and conflict overseas, trading declined rapidly across Britain.

However, the heaviest damage to the Watney Street trading community was caused by the London Blitz, 1940–41. The bombing campaign first began with an assault at 5.30pm on 7 September 1940 which lasted 24 hours. In this time an incendiary bomb was dropped on central Watney Street. The street continued to be bombed in multiple locations for the duration of the Blitz, sustaining severe structural damage and casualties along with the rest of London's East End.

In 1955, a planning process was commenced for a new marketplace and high-rise house development. The market was temporarily relocated in 1965 and development began in 1967, with north Watney Street being levelled and the adjoining Blakesley Street demolished. The project took over a decade to complete and involved pedestrianising the northern half of Watney Street, establishing a new area of operation for the market.

During the redevelopment, the market's activity declined substantially. Competition from local supermarkets also contributed to this downturn and by 1979, only eighteen stalls were operating in the area. Regeneration by the local council has been ongoing since 1991.

== Management ==
In 1991, Tower Hamlets London Borough Council identified Watney Market as a crucial shopping centre, which marked the beginning a series of regeneration projects. In 2010 the Tower Hamlets regeneration scheme began, assessing the Watney Market District Centre area and potential areas for investment within. The scheme is still a work in progress, the most recent update coming in the Tower Hamlets Town Centre Strategy 2017 to 2022 which reviewed the state of the market as of March 2017.
