= Red House, London =

Red House, London may mean

- The Red House, Bexleyheath, designed by the Arts and Crafts architect Philip Webb for William Morris in 1859
- The Red House, Bayswater, designed by the British Queen Anne Revival architect J. J. Stevenson for himself in 1874
- The Red House, Byron Hill Road, Harrow, designed by E. S. Prior in Queen Anne Revival style in 1883
