= Tyburn Brook =

Former stream in London, England

Coordinates: 51.5058°N 0.1658°W

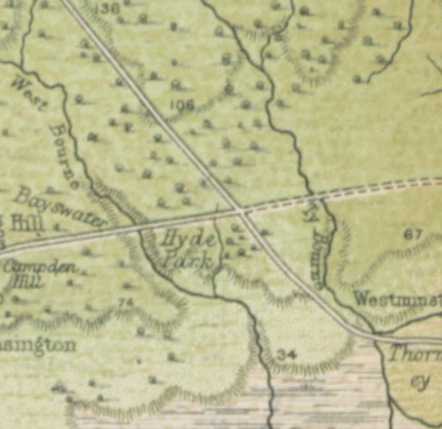
Extract from London Before the Houses, W.E. Loftie, 1884 showing at centre the little brook, west of the elevated key crossroads marked by the Tyburn Tree and Ossulstone (Oswald's Stone); today by Marble Arch.

Tyburn Brook was a small tributary stream to the West Bourne or Westbourne and ran mainly in Hyde Park for a few hundred metres south by south-west. It has lost its catchment to natural drainage into the gravelly topsoil and to surface water, foul and in early Victorian style combined sewers (mixing both types of water) and its small collect, its source remains beneath the earth to feed into a mixture of these. The Serpentine, having been the Westbourne's main showing is now fed by three boreholes instead. It is not to be confused with the much longer Tyburn, Ty Bourne or River Tyburn, but frequently was confused until the early 19th century as both were well west of the walls of the City of London.

== Literary references ==
The brook was mentioned in William Blake's Jerusalem The Emanation of the Giant Albion:

They groan’d aloud on London Stone,
They groan’d aloud on Tyburn’s Brook:
Albion gave his deadly groan,
And all the Atlantic mountains shook.

== See also ==
- Subterranean rivers of London
