= Nag's Head Market =

Coordinates: 51.5582°N 0.1186°W

Nag's Head Market is a market in London. It is situated on Seven Sisters Road in the Holloway area of the London Borough of Islington.

It is named after the Nag's Head public house, which closed in 2004; the original early Victorian building is in use today as a gambling establishment.

As part of Nag's Head Town Centre, a shopping arcade between Morrisons, Marks & Spencers and Selby's, it is governed by the Nag's Head Town Centre Management Group, made up of local businesses and services.
