= Channelsea Island =

Man-made island in East London, England

Coordinates: 51.5288°N 0.0001°E

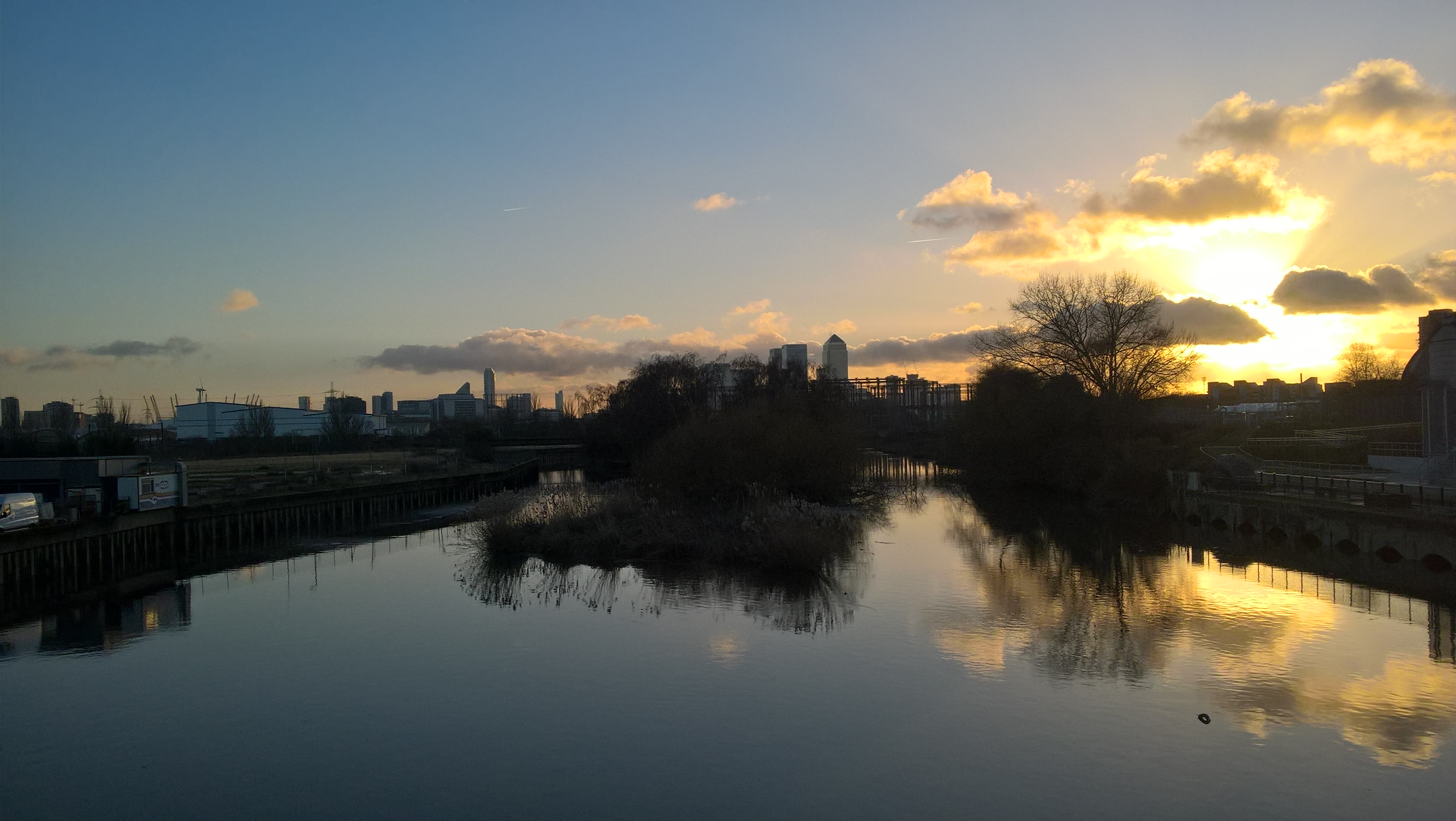
The Channelsea River, pictured in 2017, showing Channelsea Island in the centre of the river

Channelsea Island is a small man-made island in the centre of the Channelsea River in East London, near Three Mills Island in the London Borough of Newham. Before 1965, the area was part of the historic county of Essex.

The island was the site of the Abbey Mill, a medieval tidal watermill dating back to at least the 12th century, which was established by the monks of Stratford Langthorne Abbey. The mill was one of the eight watermills on the River Lea recorded in the Domesday Book. The area nearby the site of the original Abbey Mill is now known as Abbey Mills. There are several pumping stations located there, including the original Abbey Mills Pumping Station.

A series of derelict buildings remains on the island, including remains of the Abbey Mill chemical works.
