= Lettering and Sculpture Limited =

Sculpture studio in Oxfordshire, England

- Company type: Studio
- Industry: Sculpture
- Founded: July 8, 2008; 17 years ago in Ducklington, Oxfordshire, England
- Founder: Alec and Fiona Peever

Lettering and Sculpture Limited is a sculpture studio in Ducklington, Oxfordshire. It was incorporated in 2008, and the directors are sculptors Alec and Fiona Peever, a married couple who create art in collaboration with each other, with other sculptors, and with writers. Before and during the life of this company, the two sculptors have shown work at many art exhibitions, executed many commissions, supported several institutions, and won several awards.

== The studio ==
The company is run by City and Guilds-trained sculptors Alec (born 1954) and Fiona Peever (born 1964). They are business partners, and have been artistic collaborators since 1983.

As of 2019, the Lettering and Sculpture Limited studio was at Ducklington, Oxfordshire. The company was incorporated in 2008 with Alec as director and Fiona as secretary; now both are directors. They have produced public art, and other projects using various materials. Among other techniques, Alec specialises in letter cutting. They have shown their work at many exhibitions, and have achieved a number of awards.

== Institutions ==
Alec and Fiona were supporting various institutions before the company existed. Between 1984 and 1990 they were on the executive committee of the Church Buildings Council. They were on the Oxford Diocesan advisory committee between 1989 and 1984. From 1994 to 1995 they served on the Southern Arts Craft Panel. They were trustees of Memorials by Artists, which is part of the Lettering and Commemorative Arts Trust, from 1999 to 2004. Between 2004 and 2007 one of them was chairman of the West Oxfordshire Arts Association, known as West Ox Arts. Until 2019 Fiona and Alec were on the Crafts Council index of craftspeople, and this is the only institution recorded as being supported since the Lettering and Sculpture was incorporated.

== Exhibitions ==
=== Exhibitions before company incorporation ===
Alec and Fiona exhibited at the following places: New Faces at British Craft Centre, London 1980; Art in Action at Oxford 1980; Living Letters at Crafts Study Centre Bath 1981; A Wood Exhibition at Sunderland & Touring 1981; Making It at Crafts Council Gallery, London 1982; International Woodcarving Exhibition at Parnham House 1982; Prophecy & Vision at Bristol City Museum and Art Gallery 1982; Enhancing Our Inheritance, London 1984; A Closer Look at Lettering at Crafts Council Gallery, London 1984; The Artist & the Church at Leicester Museum and Art Gallery 1984; Open Show at Contemporary Applied Arts London 1988; Lettering & The Printed Word at Cirencester Workshops 1988; The Spirit of the Letter at Portsmouth City Museum & Art Gallery 1989.

In the 1990s their exhibitions moved further afield, and into churches as well: Stonecarving at St Giles', Oxford 1990; The Avant Garden at Barbican Centre, London 1991; The Art of Embellishment at Shad Thames Gallery London 1993; Crafts Showcase at Abingdon County Hall Museum 1994; Letterati at Oxford Gallery 1995; From Maquette to Monument at Rochdale Art Gallery, one man show 1995; Individual Characters at Southern Arts Touring Exhibition 1996; Fresh Air at Quenington Sculpture Show, Gloucestershire 1997; L is for Lettering at Cornwall Crafts Association, Trelowarren 1998; Last Words at Salisbury Poetry Festival 1999; The Garden Gallery Summer Exhibition at Broughton, Hampshire 1999; Crafts in Churches at Burford Church Oxfordshire 1999.

In the 21st century, they exhibited as follows: Crafts in Gardens at Stanton Harcourt Manor Oxfordshire 2001; In Memoriam. One man show at St Giles Church Oxford 2002; Stone, Fire, Paper, Water at Group Show at West Ox Arts Bampton, Oxfordshire 2003; Speaking Stones 3 at Mill Dene Garden Blockley Gloucestershire 2003; Turrill Sculpture Exhibition at Oxford 2003; Crafts in Gardens at Broughton Castle Oxfordshire 2003; Art for your Garden at West Ox Arts Bampton 2004; Angels at St Giles Church, Oxford 2005.

=== Exhibitions after company incorporation ===
These were: Hidcote Gardens Gloucestershire Sculpture Trail 2012; Fiona's stone carvings at Wyndcliffe Court, Monmouthshire 2013; Oxfordshire Artweeks garden exhibition 2014; Handmade For Highgate in London 2015; Oxfordshire Artweeks Artist's open Studio 2016; Avebury Manor & Garden Wiltshire National Trust Sculpture Trail 2016; Oxfordshire Artweeks Artist's open Studio & Gallery 2017; National Trust Sculpture Exhibition at Avebury Manor & Garden 2017 (here Fiona showed a Chameleon and a Head made from Clipsham stone). (Note: See image of Clipsham stone head here.)

== Commissions ==
=== The sculptors' curriculum vitae before company incorporation ===
Alec and Fiona's cooperative work includes installations and renovation, besides stand-alone pieces. In the 1980s that included: Memorial To Dean Walter Hussey at Chichester Cathedral 1986; Memorial to Catherine of Aragon at Peterborough Cathedral 1986; Memorial to Sir Henry Wellcome at St Paul's Cathedral 1987; Memorial to Matthew Arnold at Westminster Abbey 1988; Mural brick carving at Tunsgate Square, Guildford 1989.

In the 1990s more of Fiona and Alec's collaborative projects were produced, in proportion to renovation: Sundial Sculpture with Sioban Coppinger at Gateshead Garden Festival 1990; Memorial to St Anselm at Canterbury Cathedral 1994; D-Day Memorial at Royal Victoria Country Park Southampton 1994; Poetry and Sculpture Trail at Swindon 1995; Commemorative Plaques at Winchester Cathedral 1995; Poetry installations with Linda France at Royal Quays Tyne and Wear (Civic Trust Award) 1996; Commemorative floor plaque at Truro Cathedral 1996; Poetry installation at Jack Scruton Garden High Wycombe 1997; Commemorative boards at Wells Cathedral 1997; Public art poetry installation at Lee Valley Park, Stanstead Abbots 1998; Bronze lettering at Winchester Law Courts Hampshire County Council 1998; Commemorative tablets at Birmingham Cathedral 1998; Commemorative water feature at Oxford County Museum, Woodstock 1998; Memorial to Royal Green Jackets at Winchester Cathedral 1998; Sculpture with lettering at Hampshire Sculpture Trust Littleton Winchester 1999; Memorial to Dean Evans at St Paul's Cathedral 1999; Various Millennium monuments at Bellingham, Berrick Salome, Holton and other sites 1999.

In the 2000s there were many memorials and commemorations: Memorial waymarkers for Diana, Princess of Wales Memorial Walk at Royal Parks of London 2000; Commemorative opening feature at British Embassy, Moscow 2000; Five Gateway Marker features at Stony Stratford 2000; Commemorative sculpture with lettering at The Post Office Rugby 2001; War memorial at Magdalen College, Oxford 2001; Poetry installations at John Betjeman Memorial Park Wantage 2001; Poetry pavement at Milsom Street, Bath 2001; Memorial to Baron O'Brien at St Paul's Cathedral 2001; Carved Sculpture memorial at Lee Valley Park London 2001; Millennium Monument at Woodstock, Oxfordshire 2002; Gurkha Memorial at Winchester Cathedral 2003; Memorial to Roald Dahl at Great Missenden Buckinghamshire 2003; Memorial to Bishop John Taylor at Winchester Cathedral 2003; Memorial to Sir Sir Humphrey Gibbs at St Paul's Cathedral 2004; Memorial to Sir Owen Temple-Morris at St John the Baptist Church, Cardiff 2005; Sculptures at Glebe Gardens Basingstoke for Hampshire County Council 2005; Memorial to Sir Bertram Ramsay at St Paul's Cathedral 2006; Public Art poetry installation at Pillgwenlly Park, Newport, Wales 2007.

=== Sculptural output after company incorporation ===
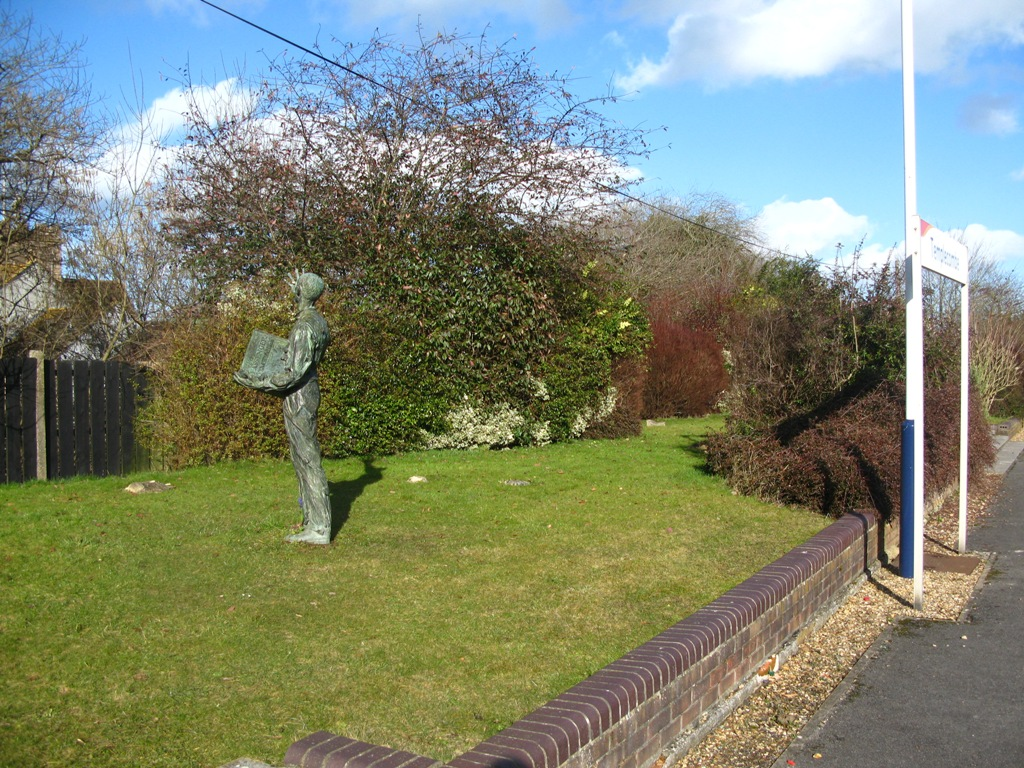
Sculpture and sundial combination at Templecombe railway station in 2010, made in collaboration with Sioban Coppinger

In 2007 Alec and Fiona were awarded a research grant for the sculpture of Mexico and for studio production development. Subsequent works and the setting up of the company would reflect that; Public Art multi-cultural poetry installations in Slough town centre 2008; Memorial to 12C Bishop Ralph de Luffa at Chichester Cathedral 2008; 9 new carved stone Gargoyles at Bodleian Library Oxford 2009; Memorial to Gustav Holst at Chichester Cathedral 2009; Migrating stones, carved forms with poetry by Alyson Hallett at The Stone Library 2009.

In the 2010s, Fiona and Alec produced the following works: Darwin's Obelisk at University Museum Oxford 2010; Poetry & sculpture installation at Rockliffe Hall Teesside 2010; New Benefactors' panel at the Bodleian Library Oxford 2010; Word sculpture at Moorbank Botanic Gardens Newcastle University 2011; Carvings and decorative metal screens at Highgate School London 2012; Commemorative Plaques at the Ashmolean Museum, Oxford 2013; Standing stone at Westmill Woodland Burial Ground, Swindon 2013; Commemorative Plaques at Military Museum Woodstock, Oxfordshire for the Project 2014; Royal commemorative Plaques at The Dickson Poon University of Oxford China Centre 2014; Sculpture with poetry Installations at Bridge Pumping Station development project, St James's 2015; Focal stone Sculpture at OGM, Oxford 2015; Royal commemorative plaques and stone signs at The Longwall Library Magdalen College, Oxford for Benefactors panel 2016; Commemorative stone bench and glass screens at Winchester College new Library and Hall buildings, Winchester 2016; Stone and bronze sculptures with carved poetry at The Henry Box School Oxfordshire 2016; Stone and bronze sculptures, architectural lettering, decorative gates at Highgate Junior School new building, London 2016; Benefactors commemorative glass panels at Winchester College treasury, Hampshire 2016; Commemorative benefactor slate plaque at Downing College, Cambridge 2017; Commemorative focal sculpture and plaque at Lady Margaret Hall, Oxford 2017.

== Proposed commissions ==
In September 2018 at a public meeting, Ducklington Parish Council made a formal enquiry about proposed public artworks for the village, and invited Fiona and Alec to speak about the possibilities. The council were in receipt of funds "solely for art projects."

== Awards ==
Before company incorporation, Alec and Fiona won an Arts Council research and development award 2007. Following incorporation, they won an Oxford Preservation Trust award 2014 and a RIBA London Award 2017.
