= Kensington Society =

Civil society in Kensington

The Kensington Society
- Established: 1953
- Founder: Gay Christiansen
- Type: Civic society
- Legal status: Charity
- Location: United Kingdom
- Region served: Kensington, London
- Members: 700
- Key people: The Duke of Gloucester (patron); Lord Carnwath of Notting Hill (president); Amanda Frame (chairman)
- Main organ: Board of Trustees
- Affiliations: 40 affiliated societies
- Website: kensingtonsociety.org

The Kensington Society is a civic society for Kensington, London. According to its website, it serves both as an individual membership organisation, with more than 700 members, and as an umbrella organisation for 40 affiliated residents' associations and conservation societies that cover specific areas of Kensington.

The society's objectives are "to preserve and improve the amenities of Kensington for the public benefit by stimulating interest in its history and records, promoting good architecture and planning in its future development and by protecting, preserving and improving its buildings, open spaces and other features of beauty or historic or public interest.”

The society was created in 1953 by a local resident, Gay Christiansen, who fought but lost a proposal to replace several historical houses on Young Street in central Kensington with a multi-storey car park. Realising that local opinion wasn't considered or reflected in the planning process, she started the Kensington Society and was its driving force for more than 40 years.

Among the successful campaigns by the society since the 1950s are the preservation of Leighton House, the saving of the remaining east wing of the severely bomb-damaged Holland House, and a revision of the originally proposed Princess Diana memorial garden in Kensington Gardens after the death of Diana, Princess of Wales in 1997. The proposal would have drastically changed large parts of the gardens. Instead, the compromise solution became the Diana, Princess of Wales Memorial Playground in Kensington Gardens, and the 7-mile (11 km) Diana, Princess of Wales Memorial Walk through Kensington Gardens, Hyde Park, Green Park and St. James's Park.

Since 1974, The Kensington Society is a registered charity. Since 2023, its president is the former Supreme Court judge Lord Carnwath of Notting Hill.
