= Fiona Peever =

British sculptor (born 1964)

- Born: Fiona Leonora H. Winkler; 1964 (age 61–62); Richmond, London, England
- Education: City and Guilds of London Art School
- Known for: Large sculptures, stone carving, heraldry, public art
- Notable work: Thomas Attwood, 1993; Royal Parks waymarkers, 2000; Bodleian Library grotesques, 2009
- Spouse: Alec Peever

Fiona Leonora H. Peever, née Winkler (born in 1964), is a British sculptor based in Oxfordshire, England. With her husband and fellow sculptor Alec Peever, she is a director of Lettering and Sculpture Limited, a sculpture studio. She carves in stone and other materials, and has produced public art, along with art for educational and religious institutions, besides private commissions. She is known for her sculpture of Thomas Attwood in Birmingham (1993), made in collaboration with Sioban Coppinger. This statue is unusual in that it appears to have stepped down from its soapbox to sit on the steps, seemingly reading some notes.

== Background ==
Fiona's paternal ancestors were mostly Londoners; members of the skilled working class who held responsible positions throughout all or most of their working lives. The family was then joined by Eastern European immigrant Ernest Winkler-Haase (later Ernest Winkler), who brought accountancy skills which heralded a move from East London to Richmond. Fiona's great great grandparents were Charles Hargrave, (Note: Charles Hargrave (Marylebone 11 May 1830 – 1920)) and Eliza Goymer, (Note: (Holbrook ca.1835 – 1907). Baptism record of William Thomas Hargreave, St Mary, Marylebone 21 June 1863. GRO index: Deaths Sep 1907 Hargrave Eliza 73 Hackney 1b 213.) Eliza was the daughter of agricultural labourer John Goymer. Charles started out as a coffeehouse keeper, then worked as a foreman porter for Midland Railway until he was at least 80 years, describing himself then as a "superannuated railway servant." (Note: Charles Hargrave. GRO index: Deaths Jun 1920 Hargrave Charles 89 Hackney 1b/376. Baptism record, 13 June 1830 St Mary, St Marylebone Rd, London.) Fiona's paternal great grandparents (the parents of her father's mother Angela Georgina) were William Thomas Hargrave, (Note: William Thomas Hargrave (Marylebone 12 May 1862 – 1947). GRO index: Births June 1862 Hargrave William Thomas Marylebone 1a 424. Deaths Mar 1947 Hargrave William T. 56 Hendon 5f 175.) a bookstall manager, selling books, newspapers and stationery, and Angela Georgina Hargrave. (Note: Angela Georgina Hargrave (Hackney, London ca.1866 – 1936). GRO index: Deaths Dec 1936 Hargrave Angela G. 70 W.Ham 4a 32) Fiona's paternal grandparents were scientific works accountant Ernest Oscar Winkler-Haase, (Note: Ernest Oscar Winkler-Haase (23 October 1889 – 1978). GRO index: Deaths Jun 1978 Winkler Ernest Oscar 23 October 1889 Richmond/T 14 148) and Dorothy Marguerite Hargrave, (Note: Dorothy Marguerite Hargrave (West Ham 29 September 1895 – 1982). GRO index: Births Dec 1895 Hargrave Dorothy Marguerite W. Ham 4a 71. Marriages Mar 1914 Hargrave Dorothy M. and Winkler-Haase Ernest O. W.Ham 4a 493. Deaths Sep 1982 Winkler Dorothy Marguerite 29 September 1895 Wandsworth 15 0970) who married in West Ham in 1914. In 1939 they were living in St Albans, Hertfordshire. (Note: E.O. Winkler-Haase has no England/Wales birth certificate. He is possibly Eugene Winkler (born Szeged, Hungary 1889), living at 2 Colville Gardens, Westminster, and working in 1911 as a bank clerk in the Anglo-Austrian Bank, London. See 1911 England Census, schedule 82 Westminster. He could also be G.O. Winkler, (born Germany 1889–1891; resident in England), living at 15 Chitty Street Westminster, and working in 1911 as a bank clerk. See 1911 census England, schedule 441.) Fiona's parents were John H. Winkler. (Note: John H. Winkler (born 1928). GRO index: Births Mar 1928 Winkler John H. Hargrave St.Albans 3a 1291) and Christine D. Willis, (Note: Christine D. Willis (born 1926). GRO index: Births Mar 1926 Willis Christine D. Chandler Shoreditch 1c 44) who married in 1954 at St Albans. (Note: Marriage of Peever's parents: GRO index: Marriages Sep 1954 John H. Winkler and Christine D. Willis St Albans 419 14 4B.) Fiona Leonora H. Winkler was born in Richmond in 1964, and was married in 1985, (Note: Fiona Peever (born 1964). GRO index: Births Jun 1964 Winkler Fiona L.H. Willis Westminster 5C 467.Marriages Jul–Sep 1985 Alec T. Peever and Fiona L.H. Winkler Richmond upon Thames Surrey 1545 14) to her business partner and artistic collaborator, the sculptor Alec Thomas Peever). (Note: Alec Thomas Peever (born 1954). GRO index: Births Sep 1954 Peever Alec T. Lowrey Surrey N.W. 5g 755.) They have been working together since 1983. She graduated in 1984 from City and Guilds of London Art School.

== Career ==
As of 2019, Fiona Peever was based with her husband at their Lettering & Sculpture Limited studio at Ducklington, Oxfordshire. The company was incorporated in 2008. She was initially the company secretary, and she additionally became a director in 2015. She creates art in partnership with her husband Alec Peever, and in cooperation with other artists. She specialises in public art, including large sculptures, stone carving and lettering, and combines traditional with experimental techniques. She uses various materials for her sculptures, including wood, steel and bronze, besides slate, marble and other types of stone.

Architectural carving is one of her specialities, and she has made church and graveyard memorials. She creates poetry trails and installations, besides garden and water features, and many of these are public works. Together with Alec she has shown her work at many exhibitions, and has achieved a number of awards.

== Works ==
The following is a small sample of many commissions which were executed by Fiona in collaboration with Alec and other artists.

=== Thomas Attwood, Chamberlain Square, Birmingham, 1993 ===
The full title of this sculpture in Chamberlain Square, Birmingham, is Thomas Attwood 1783–1856, Birmingham's first Member of Parliament. It was a collaboration between Sioban Coppinger and Fiona Peever. In this sculpture, the bronze Thomas Attwood, the economist who helped bring about the Reform Act of 1832, has apparently climbed down from his pedestal – or soapbox – and is sitting on the steps of the amphitheatre, continuing his work. Inscribed on the steps where he has walked are the words, "prosperity," "the vote," and "reform." His scattered notes are titled: Votes for All, Full Employment, and Free Trade. The sculpture has been "said to reflect the values Mr Attwood promoted – reform, vote and prosperity."

The sculpture was removed for safekeeping in 2015, before Birmingham Central Library was demolished in the following year. The statue may be gone until building work is completed, but the brown plaque that commemorates it remains.

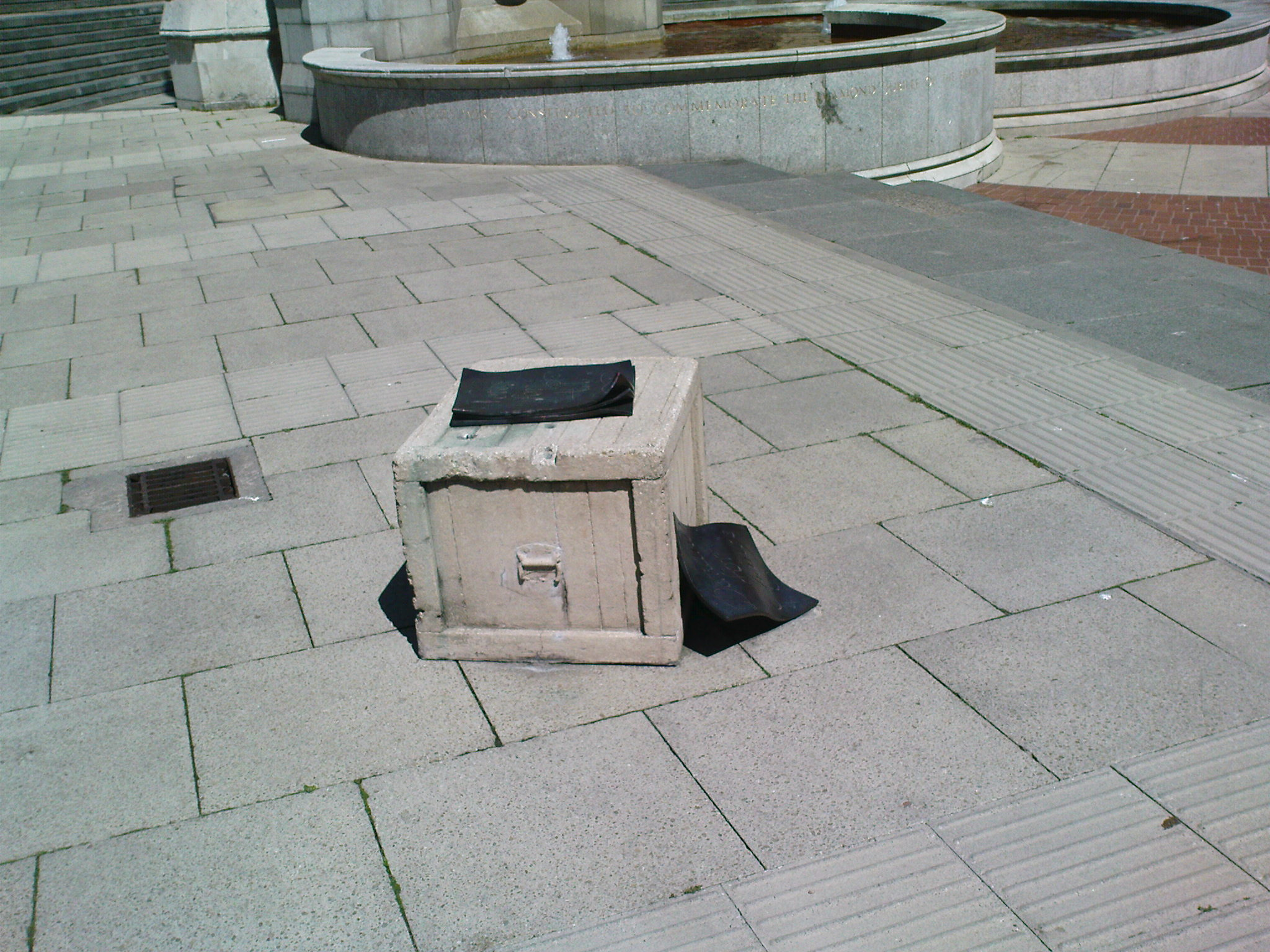
Thomas Attwood, 1993: "Having left his plinth ...

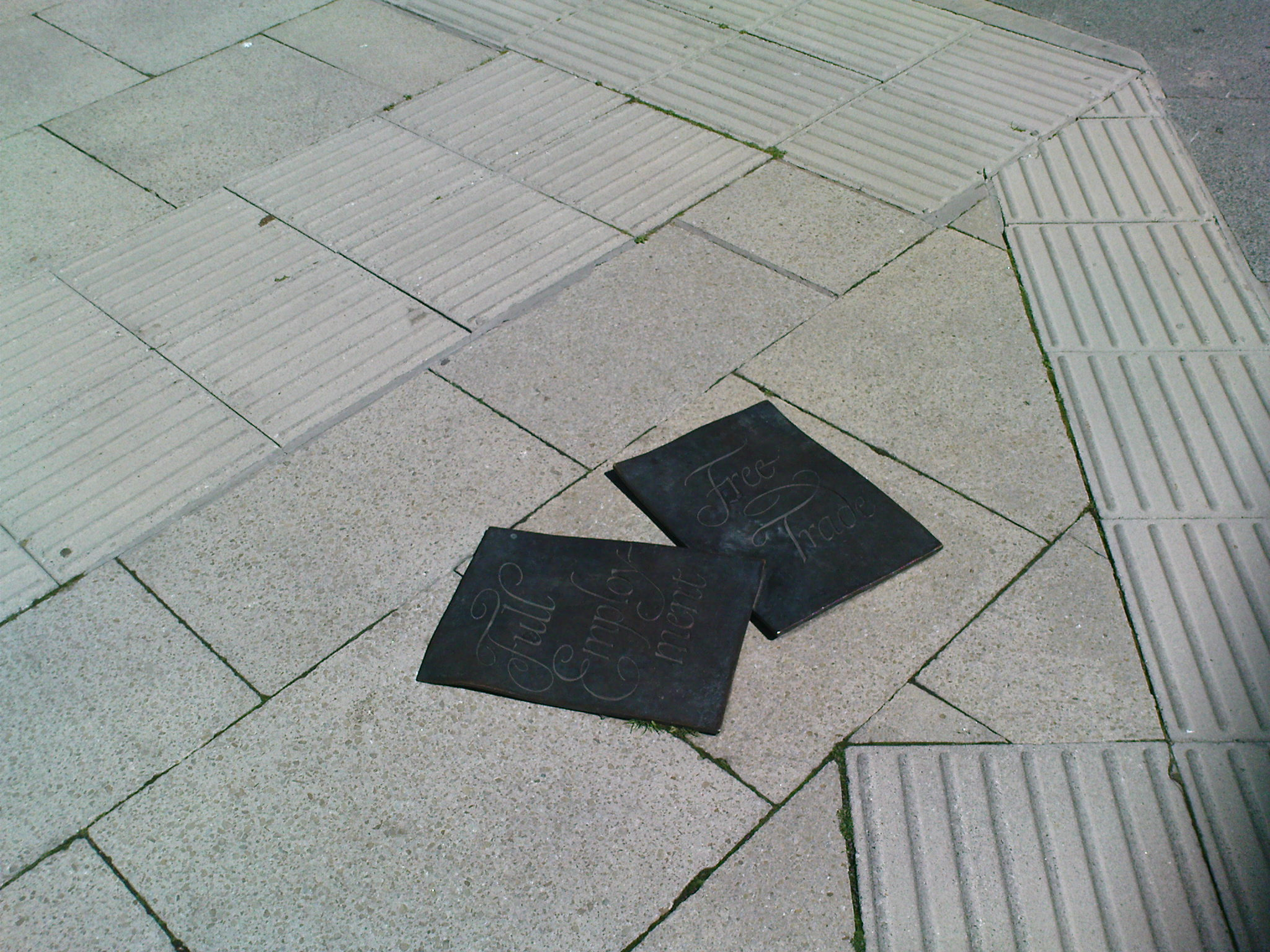
... and having scattered his bronze pages on the steps ...

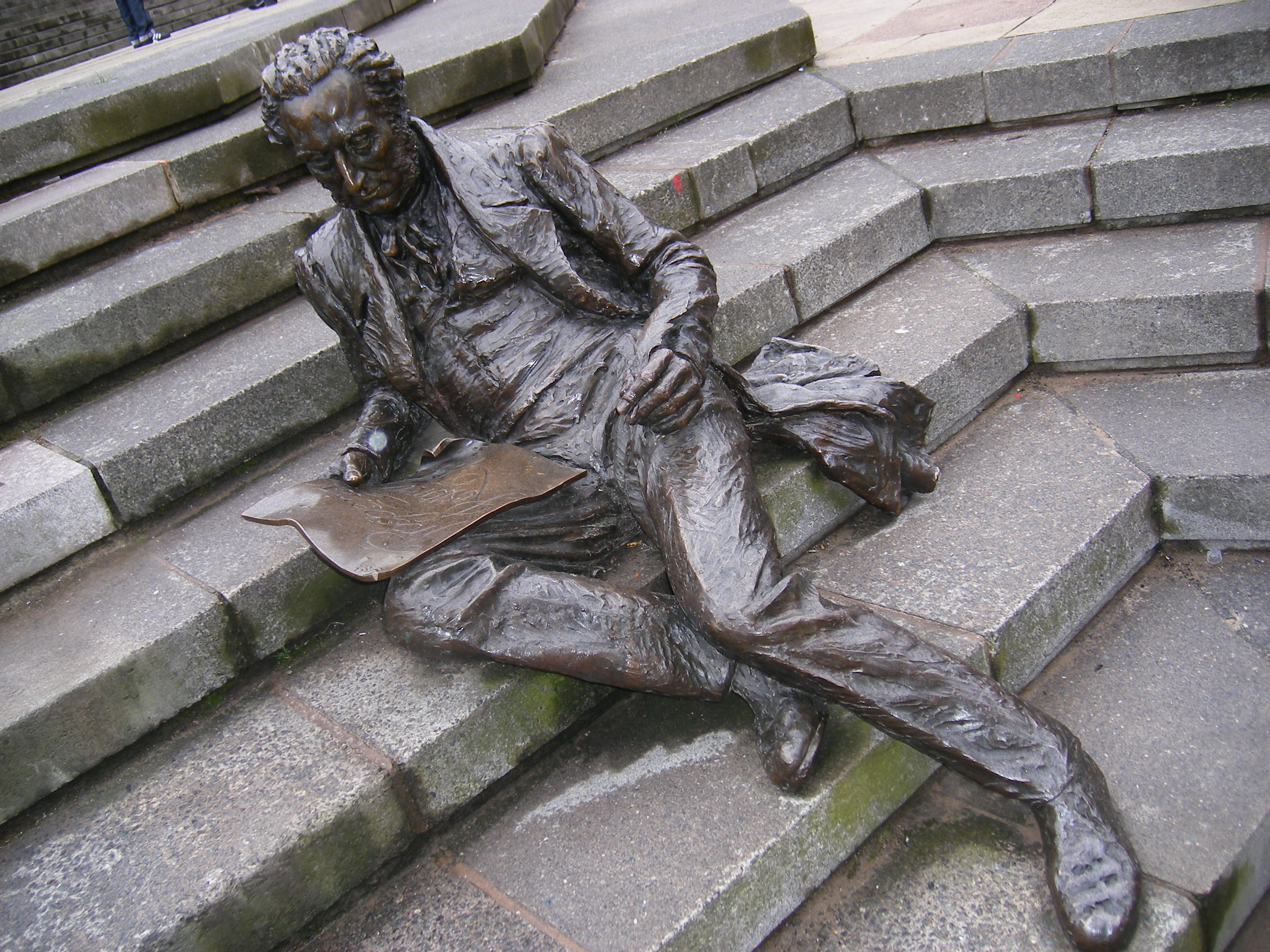
... the statue sits ..."

=== Royal Parks waymarkers, 2000 ===
These are stone and metallic pavement markers which guide visitors on the Diana, Princess of Wales Memorial Walk in London. They were created in collaboration with Alec Peever.

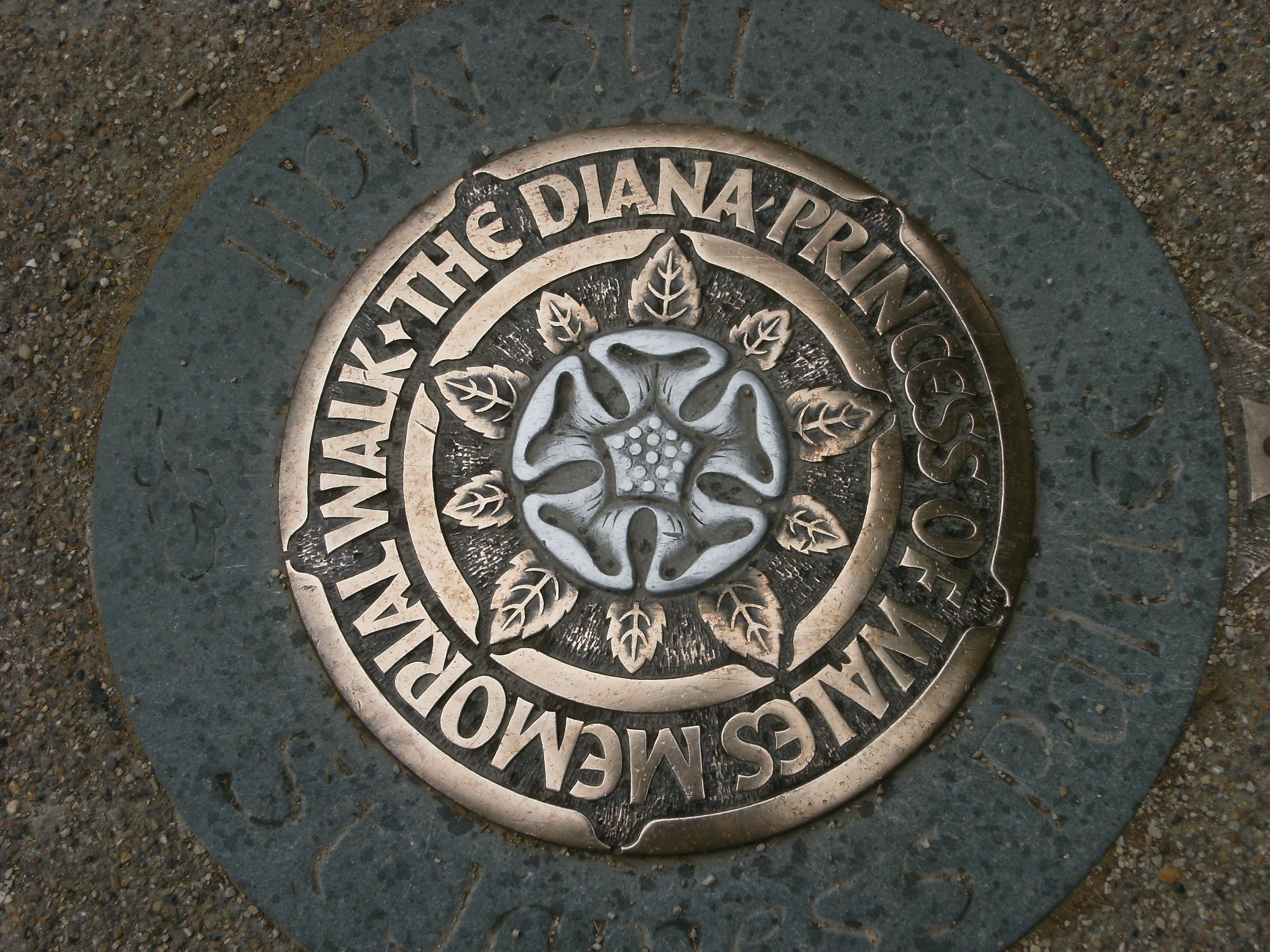
Waymarkers: at The Mall, London 2000 –

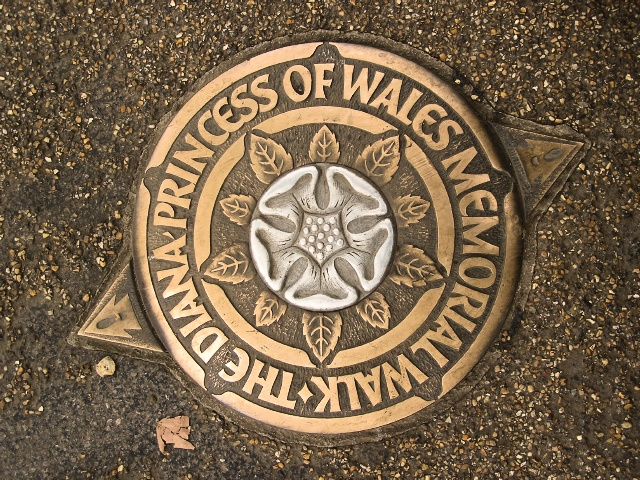
– at Green Park, 2000 –

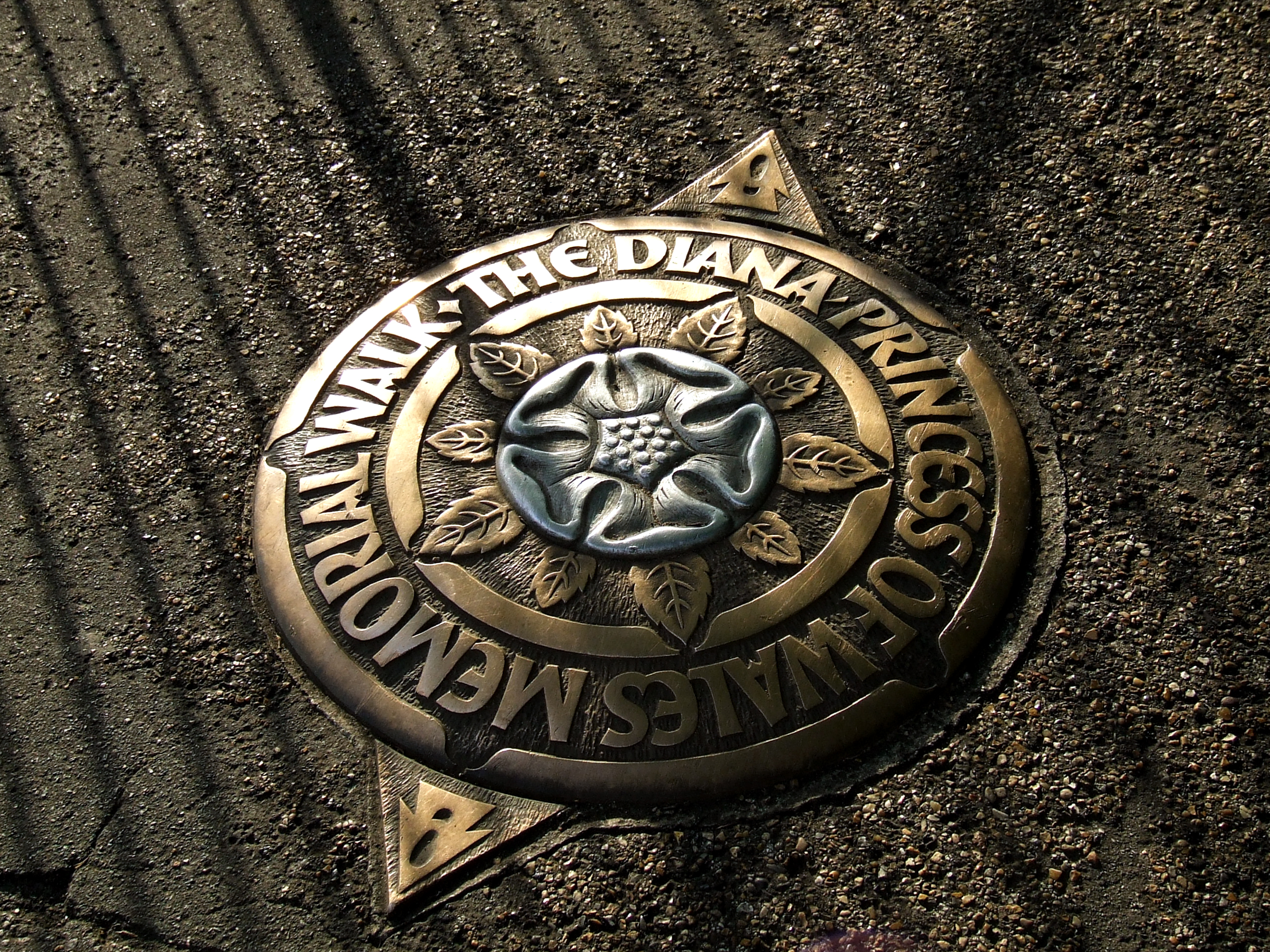
– and at St James's Park, 2000

=== Bodleian Library grotesques, Oxford 2007–2009 ===
This project involved a Millennium Myths and Monsters Festival competition in which children designed grotesque carvings to replace weather-worn ones on the Bodleian Library, Oxford. Fiona and Alec Peever developed stone carvings from the children's designs, and they were placed high on the cornice of the library. The nine winning designs are: Wild boar, Dodo, Tweedledum and Tweedledee, J. R. R. Tolkien characters, General Pitt Rivers, Aslan the Lion, Green Man, Sir Thomas Bodley, and Three Men in a Boat. Isobel Hughes, the University of Oxford's head of building conservation, commented: "The grotesques will stare out over Oxford for hundreds of years. I hope the winners will be able to revisit their stone carvings many times, bringing their children and their grandchildren to see them too."

Regarding the view of the carvings from below, Alec Peever said: "It's to do with the foreshortening and the perspective of the figures, and also the way the shadows work in order to create the strength of design that can be understood by the passerby." Dr Sarah Thomas, librarian, said: "They have been beautifully interpreted by the stone carvers who have managed to create grotesques that work as sculptures and yet still capture the original charm of the children's drawings." In 2010 Fiona and Alec received a Grotesques Award from the University of Oxford Estate Services.

=== Architectural sculpture, Highgate Junior School, 2016 ===
This Junior department of Highgate School in London was designed by Architype in Portland stone to replace the Cholmeley House library, and completed in 2016. Fiona and Alec executed sculptures here, including a chameleon, a centipede, and gargoyles on themes appropriate for children, as well as a painted glass window screen.
