= Diana, Princess of Wales Memorial Fountain =

Memorial in London, England

Coordinates: 51°30′16.7″N 00°10′17.4″W

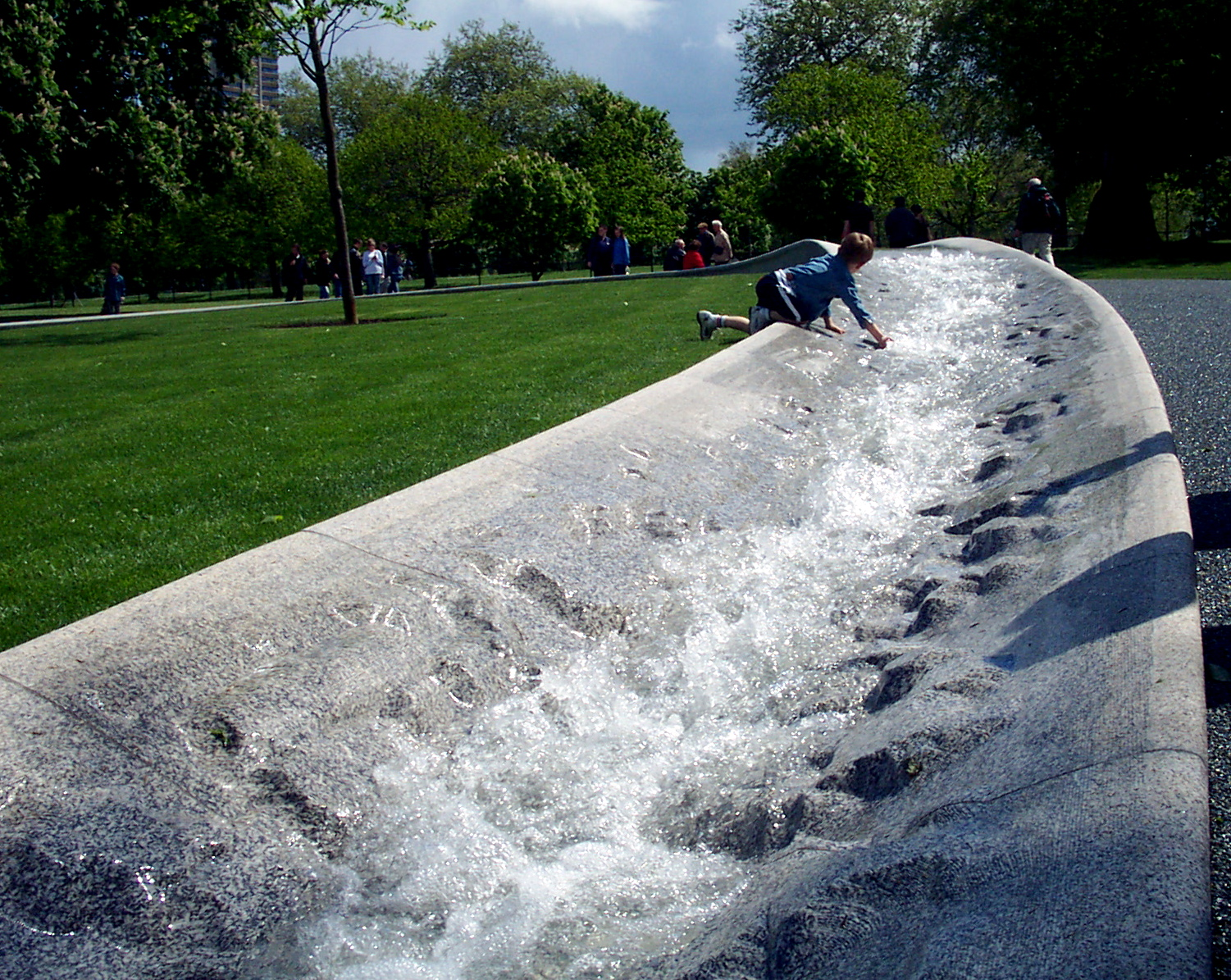
The Diana, Princess of Wales Memorial Fountain, in London's Hyde Park

The Diana, Princess of Wales Memorial Fountain is a memorial in London dedicated to Diana, Princess of Wales, who died in a car crash in 1997. It was designed to express Diana's spirit and love of children.

The fountain is located in the southwest corner of Hyde Park, just south of the Serpentine lake and east of the Serpentine Gallery. Its cornerstone was laid in September 2003 and it was officially opened on 6 July 2004 by Queen Elizabeth II. Also present were Diana's younger brother Charles Spencer, her ex-husband Prince Charles (the future Charles III), her sons Prince William and Prince Harry, her ex–father-in-law Prince Philip and her two sisters Lady Jane Fellowes and Lady Sarah McCorquodale. The opening ceremony brought the Windsors and the Spencers together for the first time in seven years.

== Design ==
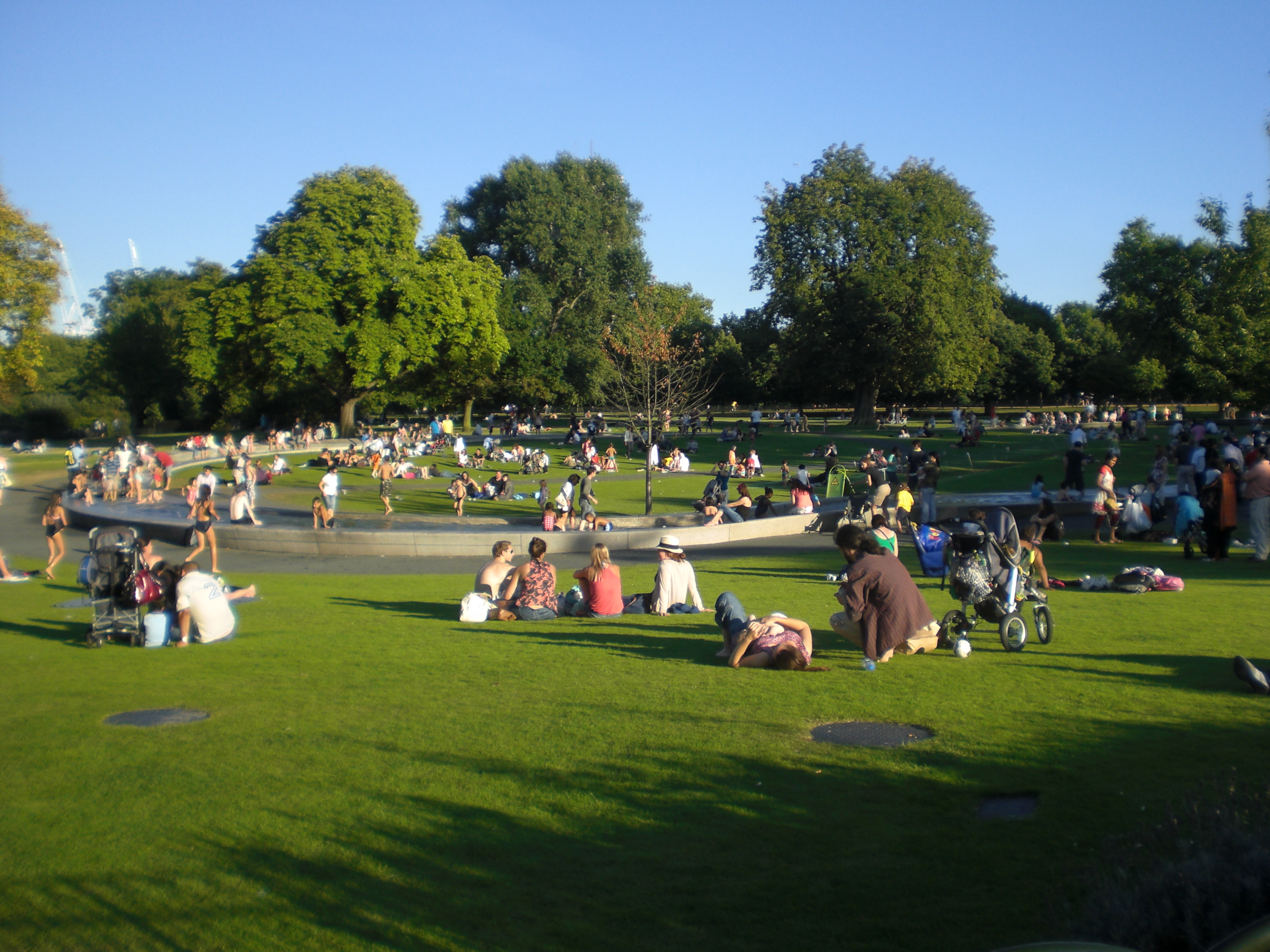
The Memorial Fountain area in Hyde Park

Work on the project began in 2001. The fountain was designed by Gustafson Porter, and cost £3.6 million. Kathryn Gustafson, an American landscape architect, said that she had wanted the fountain to be accessible and to reflect Diana's "inclusive" personality. Gustafson said: "Above all I hope that it provides a fitting memorial for the princess and does credit to the amazing person that she was."

The mechanical and electrical design was completed by Ocmis Ltd, a fountain specialist based in Somerset, UK. Their role was to work alongside Gustafson Porter to design the necessary pumping equipment to achieve the desired water effects, this included the construction of scale mock-ups within their Somerset headquarters.

== Construction ==
The 545 individual pieces of Cornish granite were cut using sophisticated computer-guided cutting machines by S. McConnell & Sons, in Kilkeel, Northern Ireland, then transferred to England by sea.

Although described as an oval stone fountain, the memorial has the form of a large, oval stream bed measuring about 50 by 80 m (165 by 260 ft); it surrounds, and is surrounded by, a lush grassy field. The granite stream bed is from 3 to 6 m (10 to 20 ft) wide, is quite shallow and is laid out on a gently sloping portion of the park, so that water pumped to the top of the oval flows down either side. One side of the stream bed descends fairly smoothly to the downhill end of the oval with gentle ripples; the other side consists of a variety of steps, rills, curves, and other shapes so that the water plays in interesting ways as it flows to the tranquil pool at the bottom. The two sides were intended to show two sides of Diana's life: happy times, and turmoil.

== Safety and drainage ==
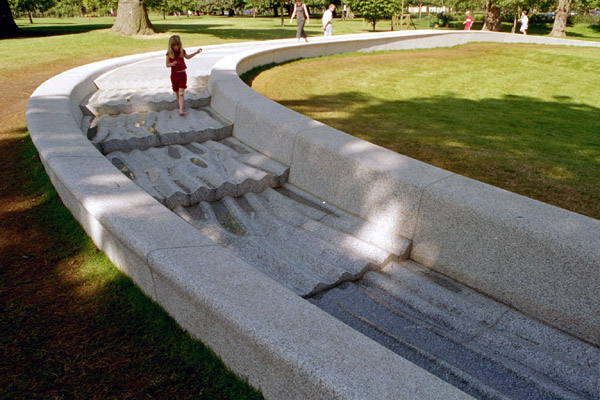
Detail of stream bed without water flowing.

Diana was seen as a contemporary and accessible princess, so the goal of the memorial fountain was to allow people to access the structure and the water for quiet wading and contemplation. However, shortly after its opening, and after three hospitalisations caused by people slipping in the water, the fountain was closed. It reopened in August 2004, surrounded by a new fence, and people were prevented from walking or running in the water by six wardens.

Even though the fountain was only open for a part of the 2004 season, and the weather was not particularly wet, the grass adjacent to part of the fountain was badly damaged, and it appeared that it would turn to a quagmire if heavy rain ever fell during the main visiting season. Thus, in December 2004, another alteration project was started. This involved work on the drainage, together with laying new hard surfaces on some of the most frequently walked areas of the site and the planting of a special hard-wearing rye grass mix in others.

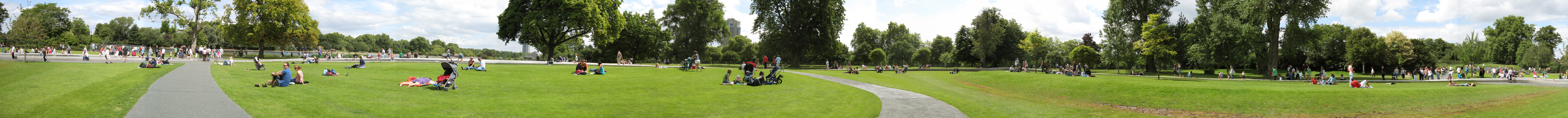
360-degree panorama

== See also ==
- Statue of Diana, Princess of Wales
- Diana, Princess of Wales Memorial Playground
- Diana, Princess of Wales Memorial Walk
