= Kensington Gardens =

Park in London, England

Coordinates: 51°30′26″N 0°10′49″W

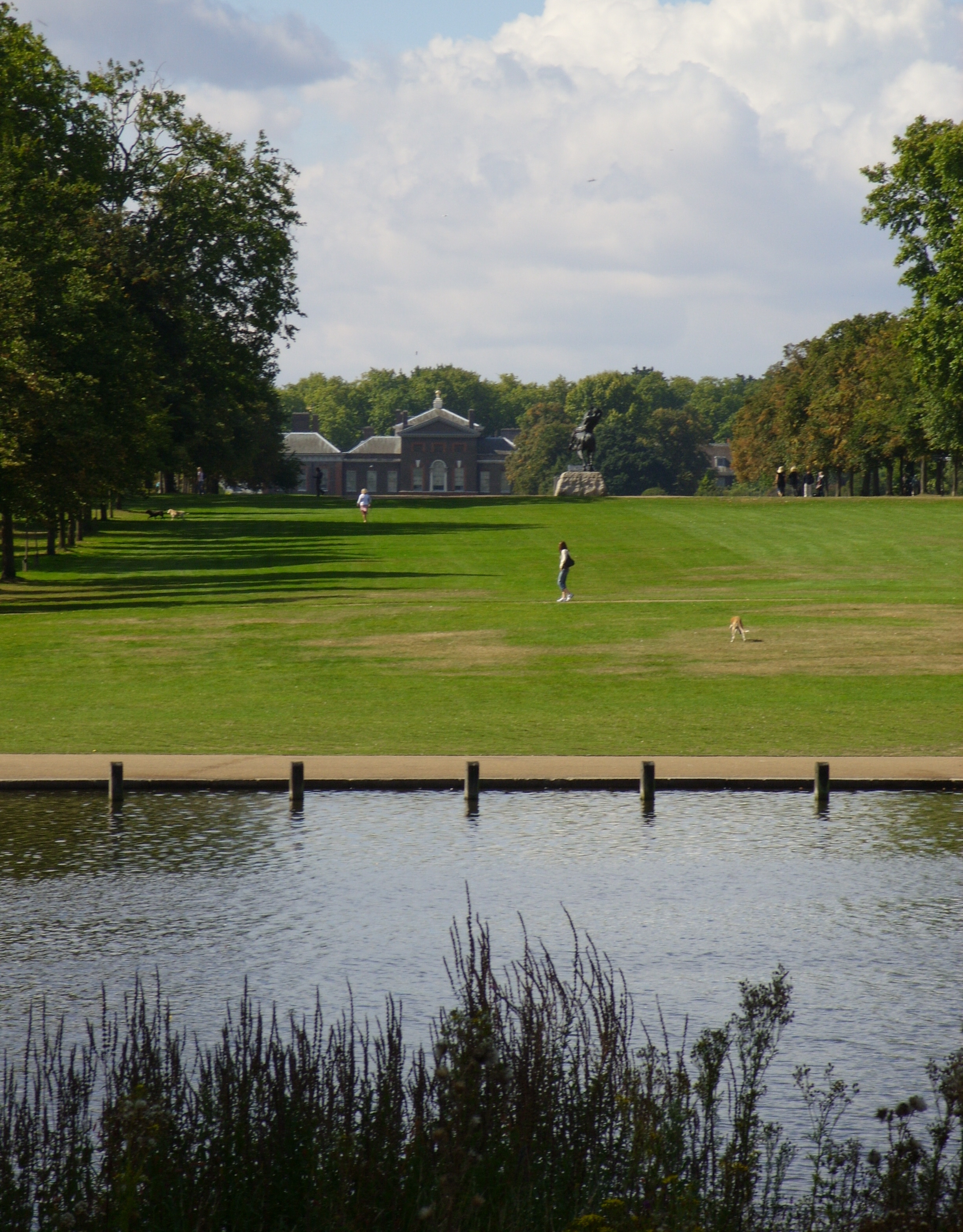
View across The Long Water to Kensington Palace

Kensington Gardens, once part of the private gardens of Kensington Palace, are now among the Royal Parks of London and largely open to the public. The gardens are shared by the City of Westminster and the Royal Borough of Kensington and Chelsea and sit immediately to the west of Hyde Park, in west London. The gardens cover an area of 107 hectares (265 acres). The open spaces of Kensington Gardens, Hyde Park, Green Park, and St. James's Park together form an almost continuous "green lung" in the heart of London. Kensington Gardens are Grade I listed on the Register of Historic Parks and Gardens.

== Background and location ==
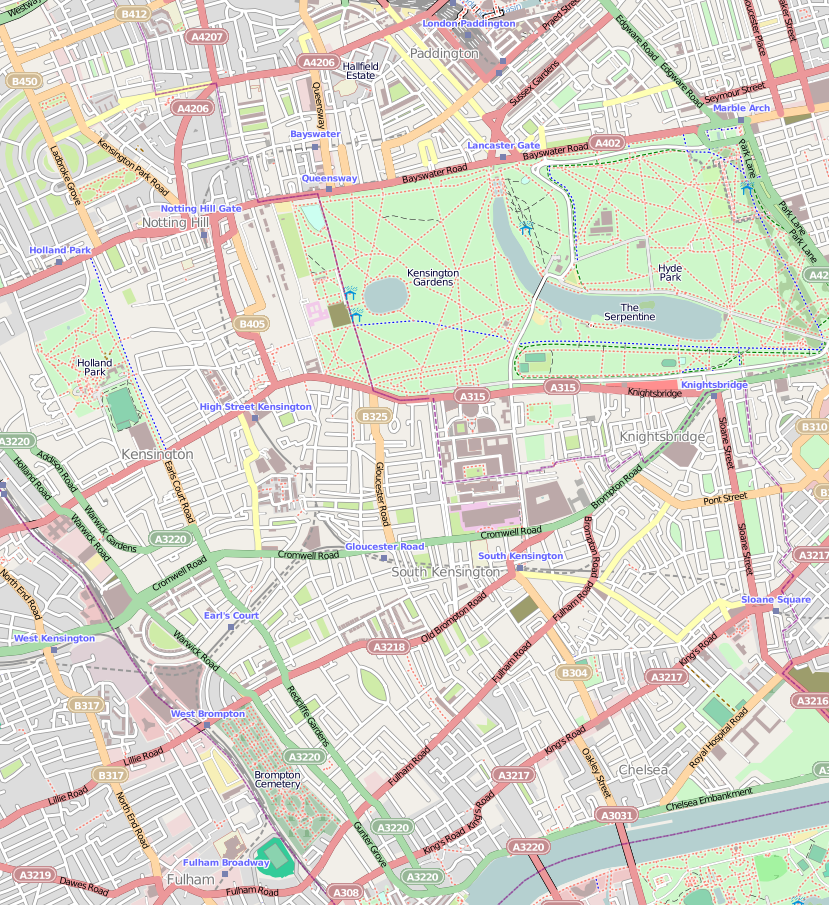
Map of Kensington, showing the gardens

Kensington Gardens are generally regarded as being the western extent of the neighbouring Hyde Park from which they were originally taken, with West Carriage Drive (The Ring) and the Serpentine Bridge forming the boundary between them. The Gardens are fenced and more formal than Hyde Park. Kensington Gardens are open only during the hours of daylight, whereas Hyde Park is open from 5 am until midnight all year round.

Kensington Gardens has been long regarded as "smart" because of its more private character around Kensington Palace. However, in the late 19th century, Hyde Park was considered more "fashionable", because of its location nearer to Park Lane and Knightsbridge.

== History ==
Kensington Gardens was originally the western section of Hyde Park, which had been created by Henry VIII in 1536 to use as a hunting ground. Beginning under Queen Anne, it was designed by Henry Wise and Charles Bridgeman in order to form a landscape garden, with fashionable features including the Round Pond, formal avenues and a sunken Dutch garden. It was separated from the remainder of Hyde Park in 1728 at the request of Queen Caroline.

Bridgeman created the Serpentine between 1726 and 1731 by damming the eastern outflow of the River Westbourne from Hyde Park. The part of the Serpentine that lies within Kensington Gardens is known as "The Long Water". At its north-western end (originally the inflow of the River Westbourne), in an area known as "The Italian Garden", there are four fountains and a number of classical sculptures. At the foot of the Italian Gardens is a parish boundary marker, delineating the boundary between Paddington and St George Hanover Square parishes, on the exact centre of the Westbourne river. Kensington Gardens were opened to the public in 1841.

== Buildings and monuments ==
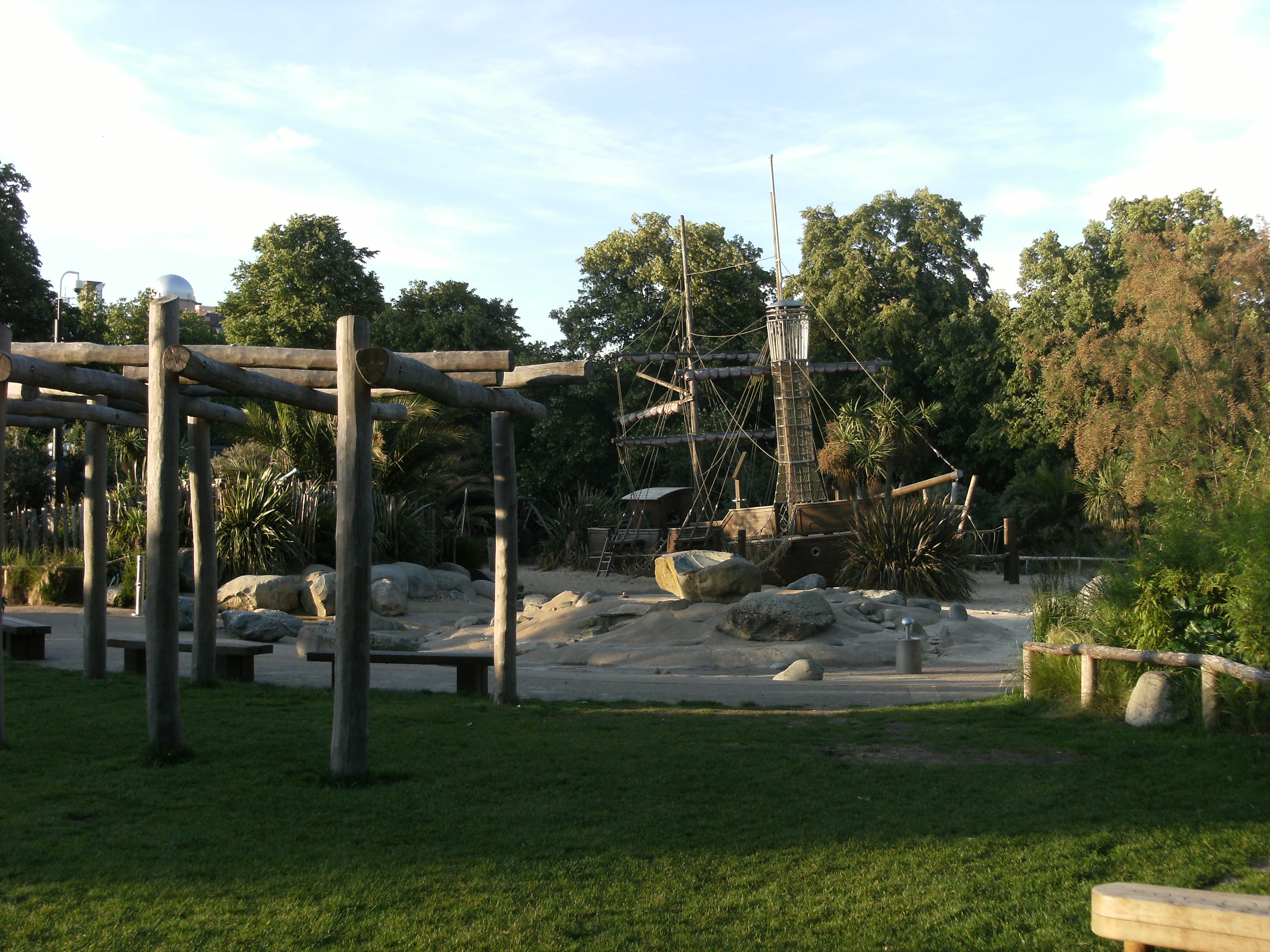
The Diana, Princess of Wales Memorial Playground (erected on the site of the existing Peter Pan children's playground) is inspired by Peter Pan.

The land surrounding Kensington Gardens was predominantly rural and remained largely undeveloped until the Great Exhibition in 1851. Many of the original features survive along with the Palace, and there are other public buildings such as the Albert Memorial (at the south-east corner of Kensington Gardens, opposite the Royal Albert Hall), Queen Caroline's Temple, the Serpentine Gallery, and Speke's monument. Queen Victoria had commissioned the Italian Gardens and the Albert Memorial during a series of improvements.

Another feature is the bronze statue of Peter Pan by George Frampton standing on a pedestal covered with climbing squirrels, rabbits and mice. It is also home to the Diana, Princess of Wales Memorial Playground and a seven-mile Memorial Walk. A statue of Queen Victoria sculpted by her daughter, Princess Louise, to celebrate 50 years of her mother's rule stands outside Kensington Palace. The park also contains the Elfin Oak, an elaborately carved 900-year-old tree stump.

== In popular culture ==
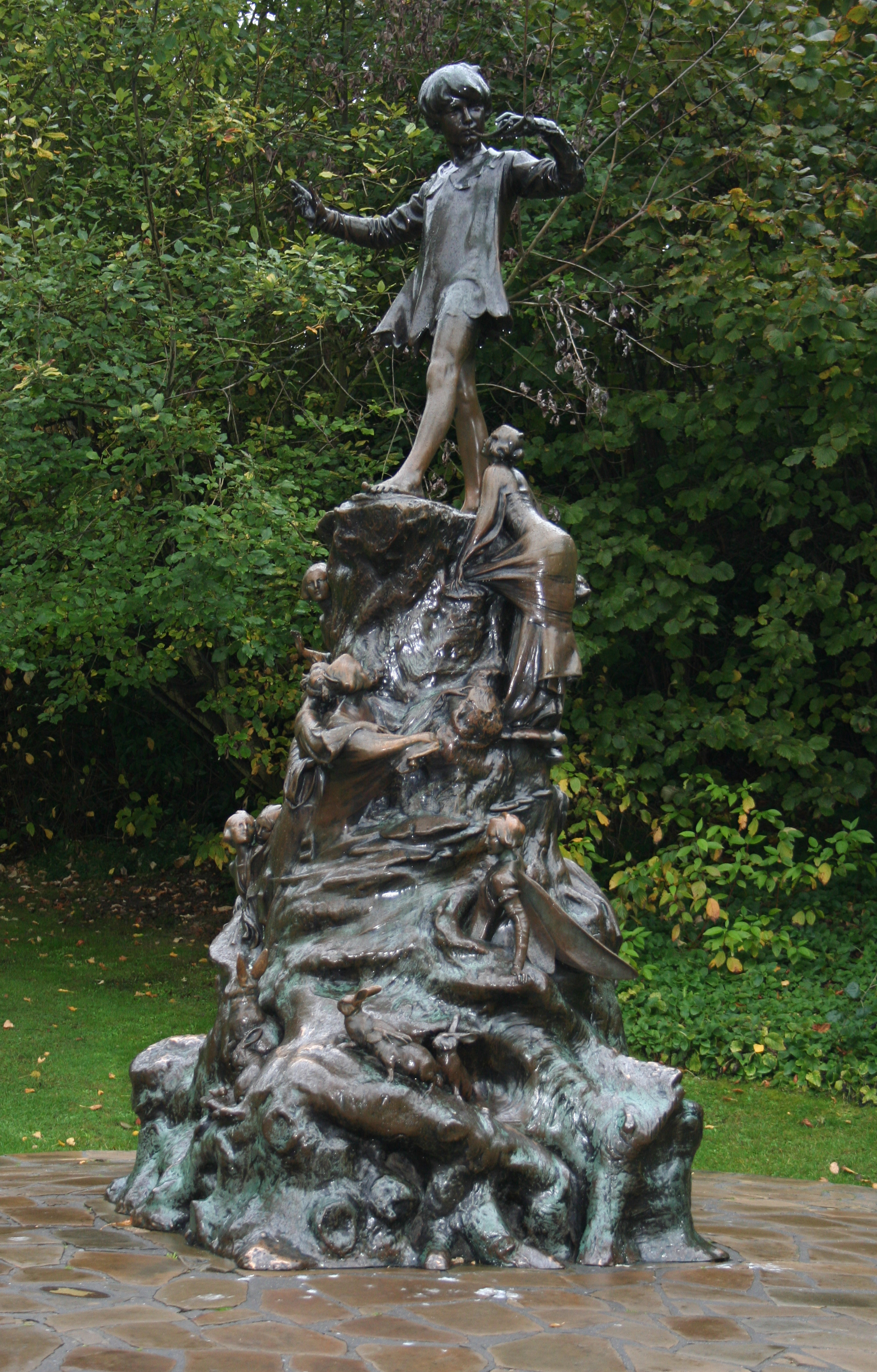
Peter Pan statue

In his 1722 poem Kensington Garden, Thomas Tickell depicted the area as inhabited by fairies.

The park is the setting of J. M. Barrie's book Peter Pan in Kensington Gardens, a prelude to the character's famous adventures in Neverland. Both the book and the character are honoured with the Peter Pan statue by George Frampton located in the park.

Rodrigo Fresán's novel Kensington Gardens concerns in part the life of J. M. Barrie and of his creation Peter Pan, and their relationship with the park, as well as the narrator's own.

The opening scene of Wilkie Collins’s story "Mrs. Zant and the Ghost" (1887) takes place in Kensington Gardens – the section that "remains nearest to the old Palace of Kensington."

The Infocom interactive fiction game Trinity begins in the Kensington Gardens. The player can walk around many sections of the gardens, which are described in moderate detail.

== Gallery ==
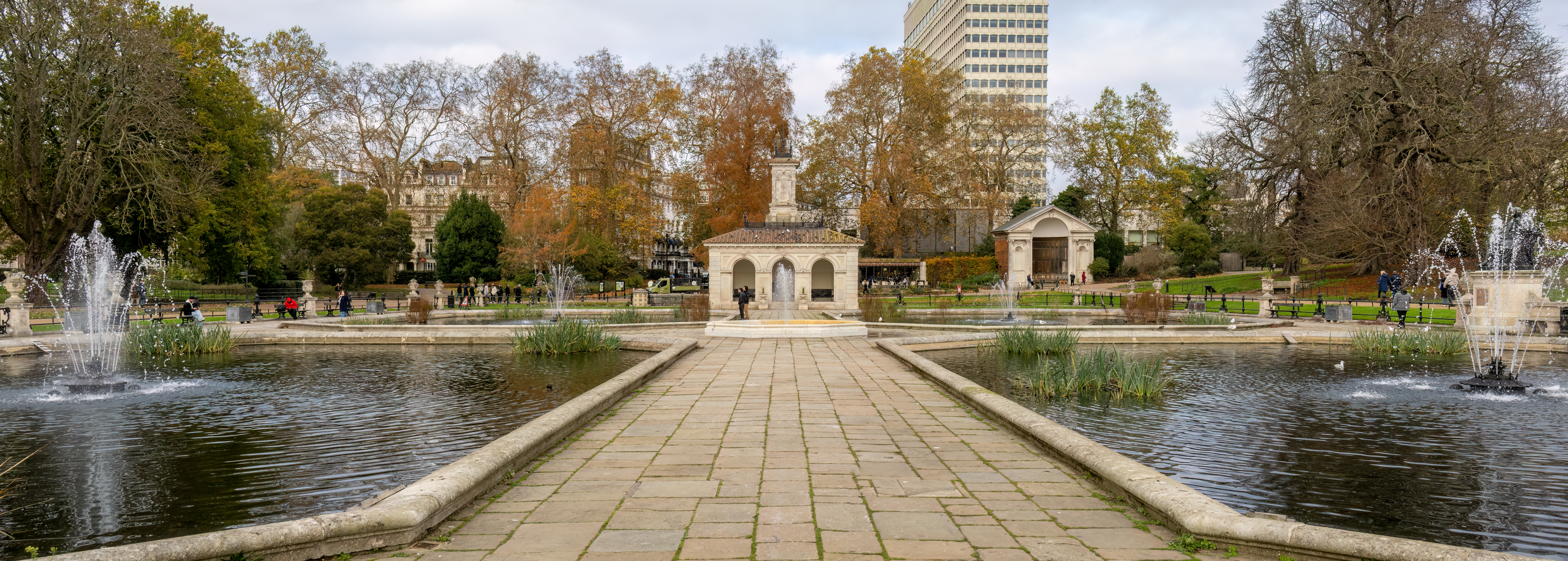
Italian Gardens

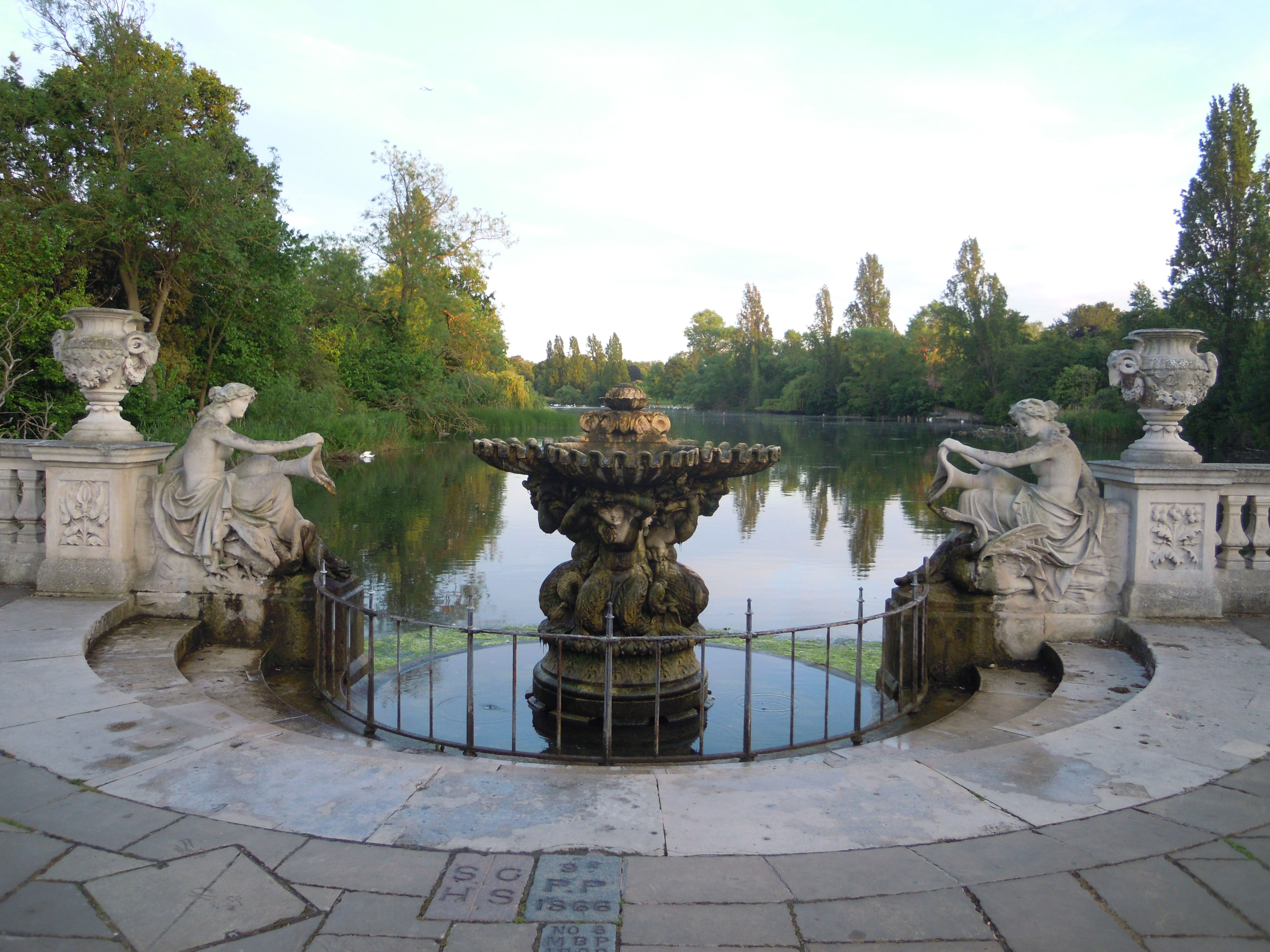
Fountain on The Serpentine

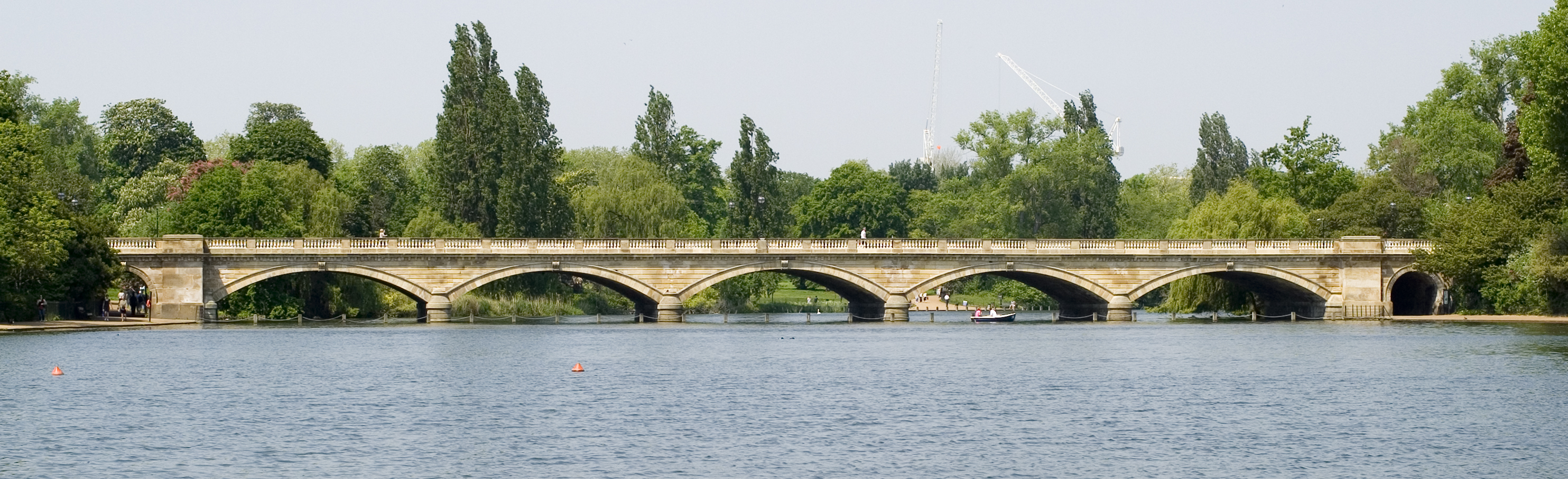
The Serpentine Bridge seen from Hyde Park

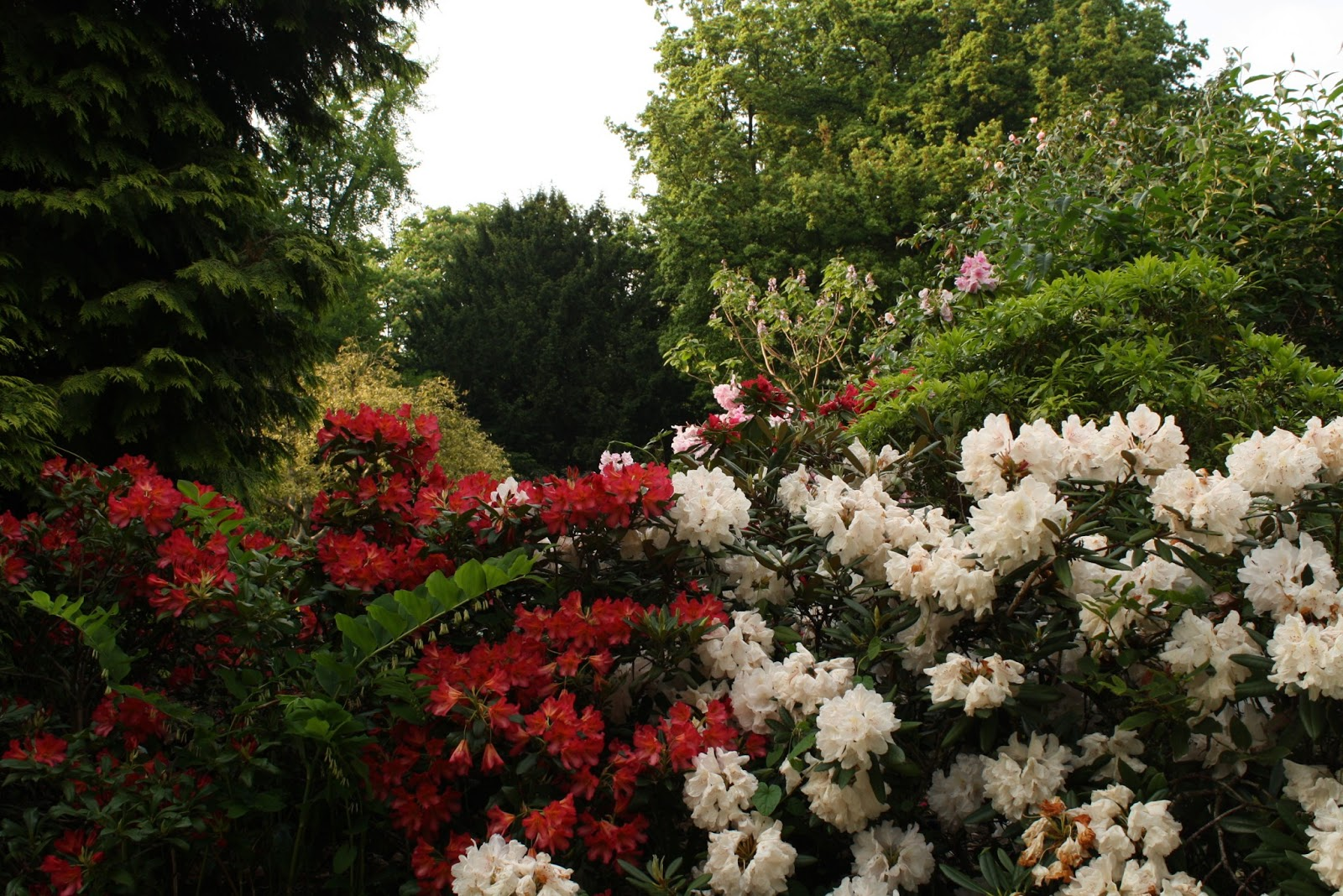
Kensington Gardens, near the Flower Walk

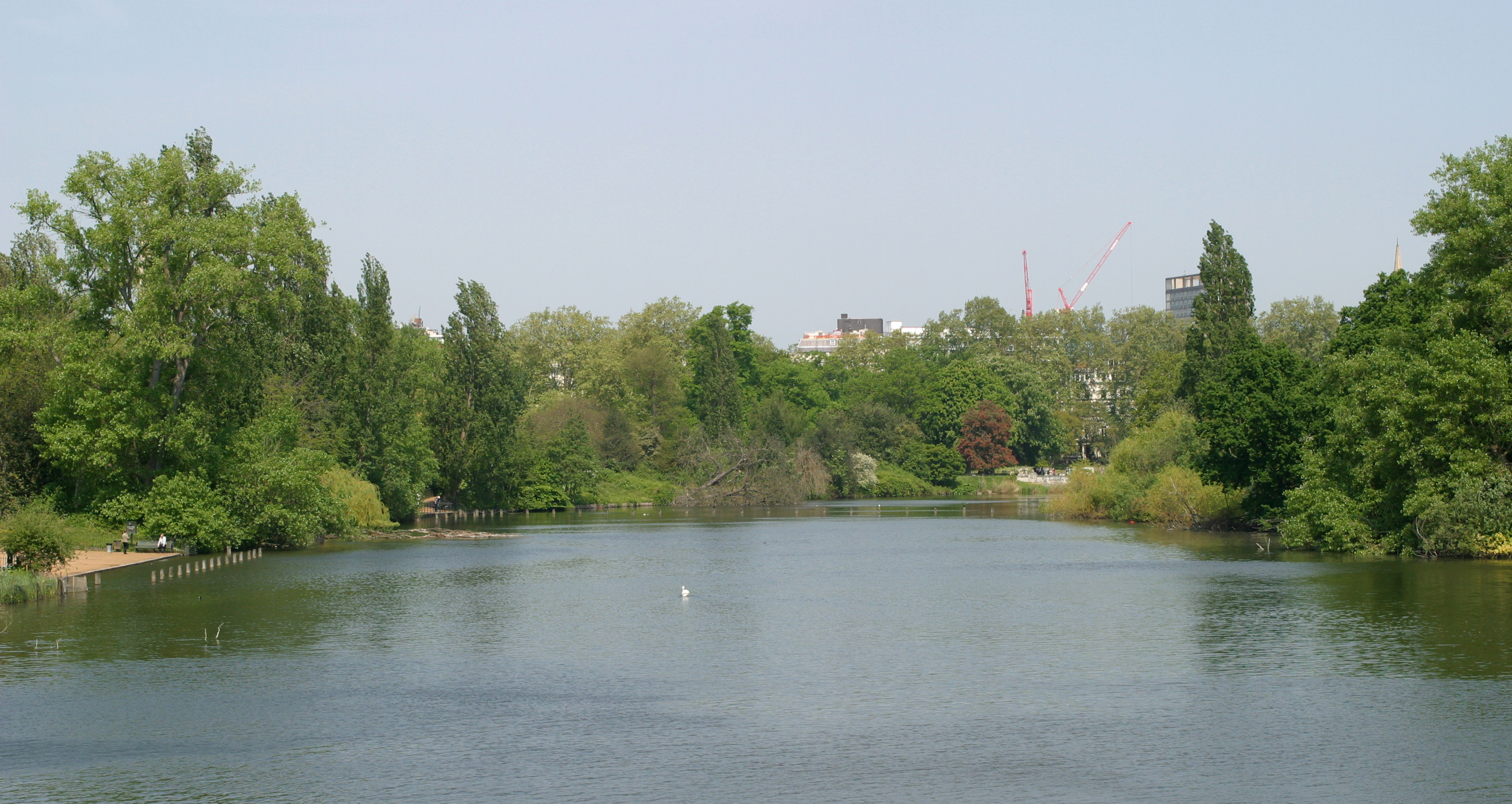
The Long Water looking north-west from the Serpentine Bridge

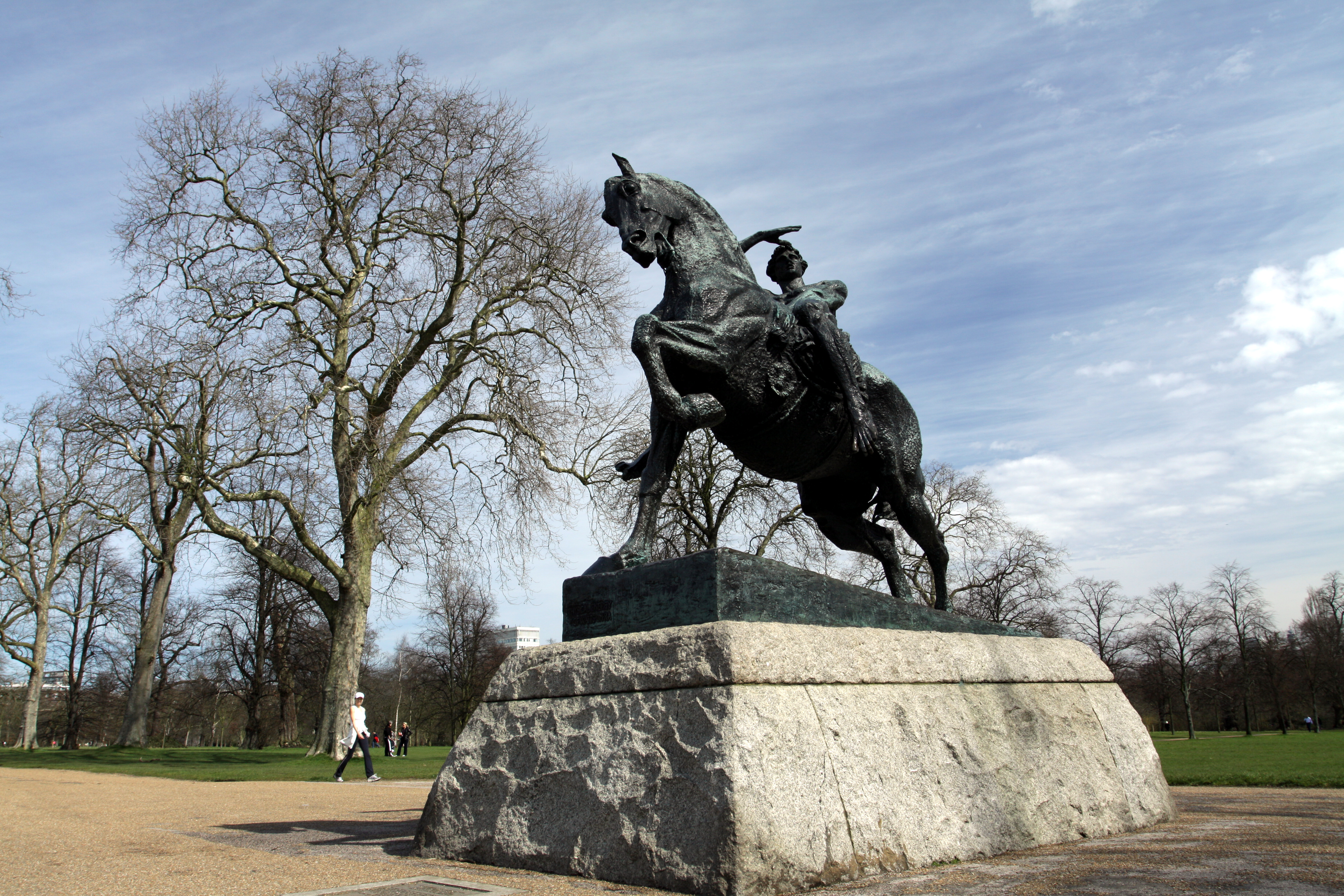
Physical Energy by G. F. Watts

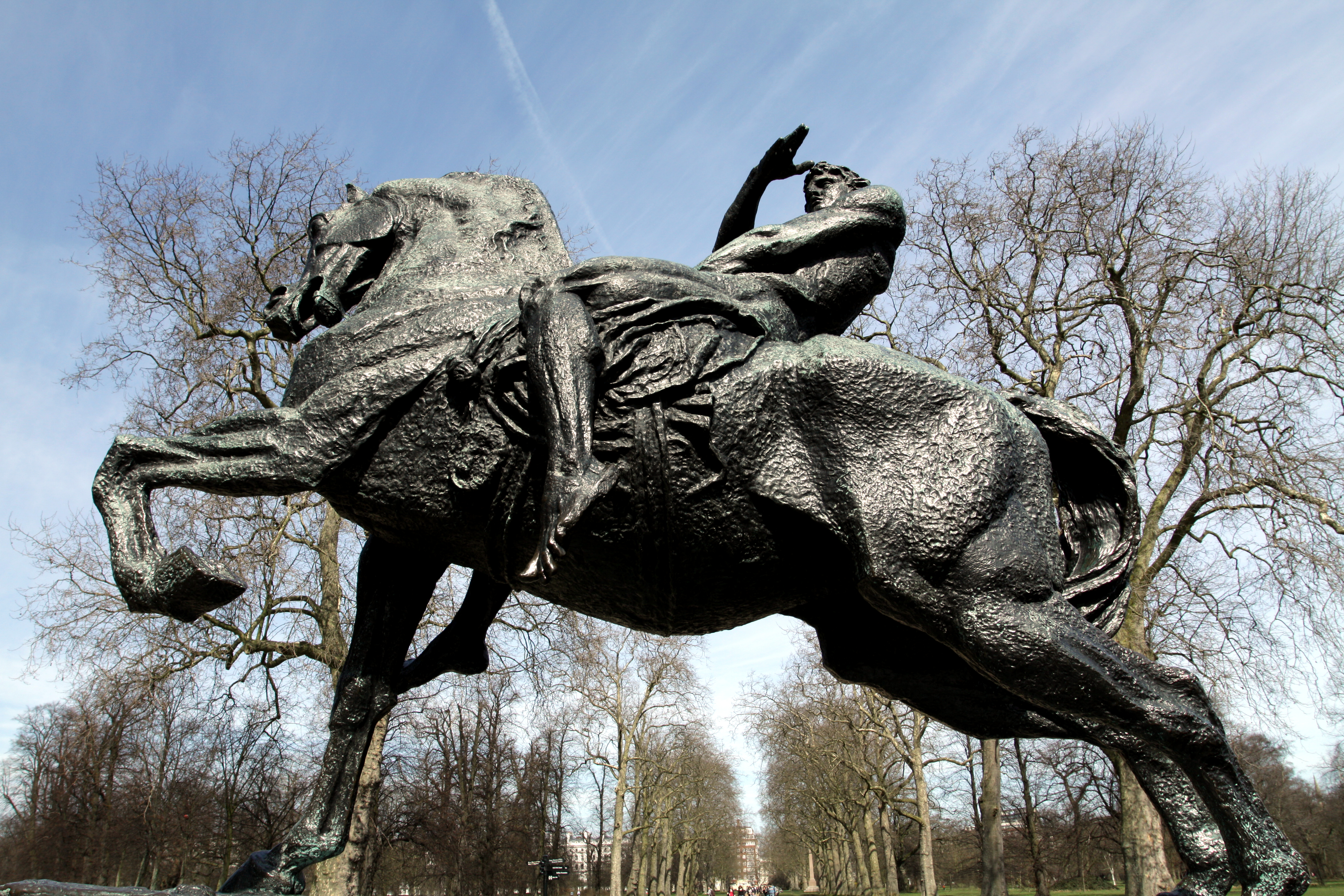
Physical Energy sculpture

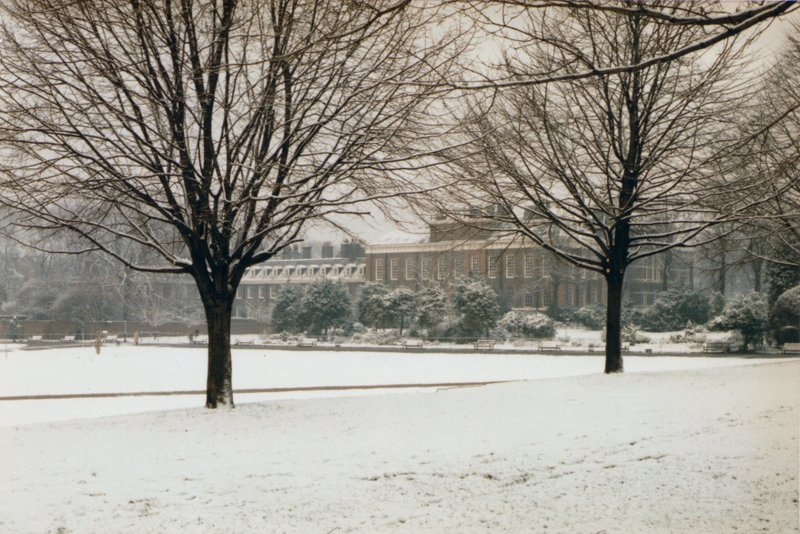
The gardens and palace in winter
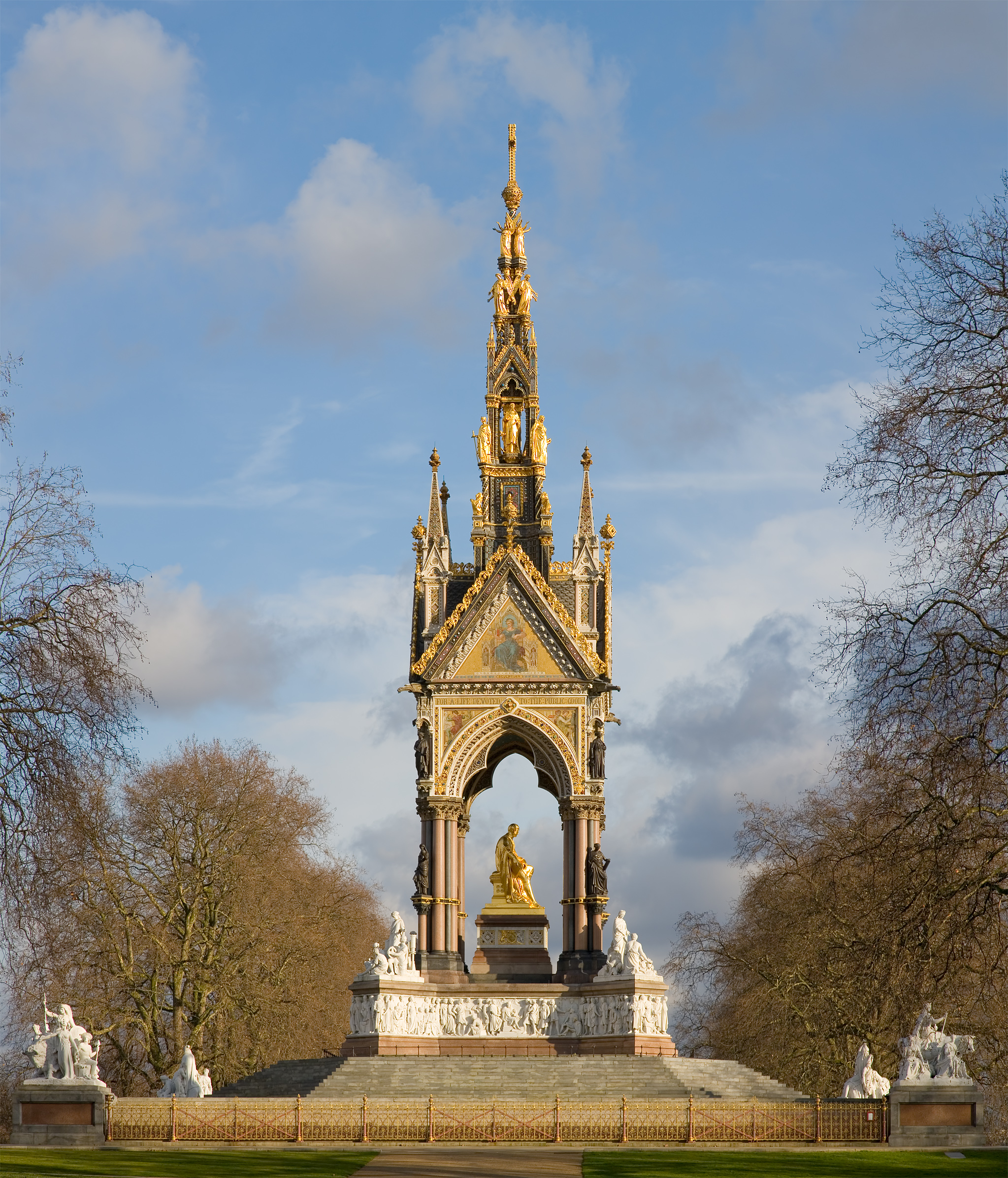
The Albert Memorial

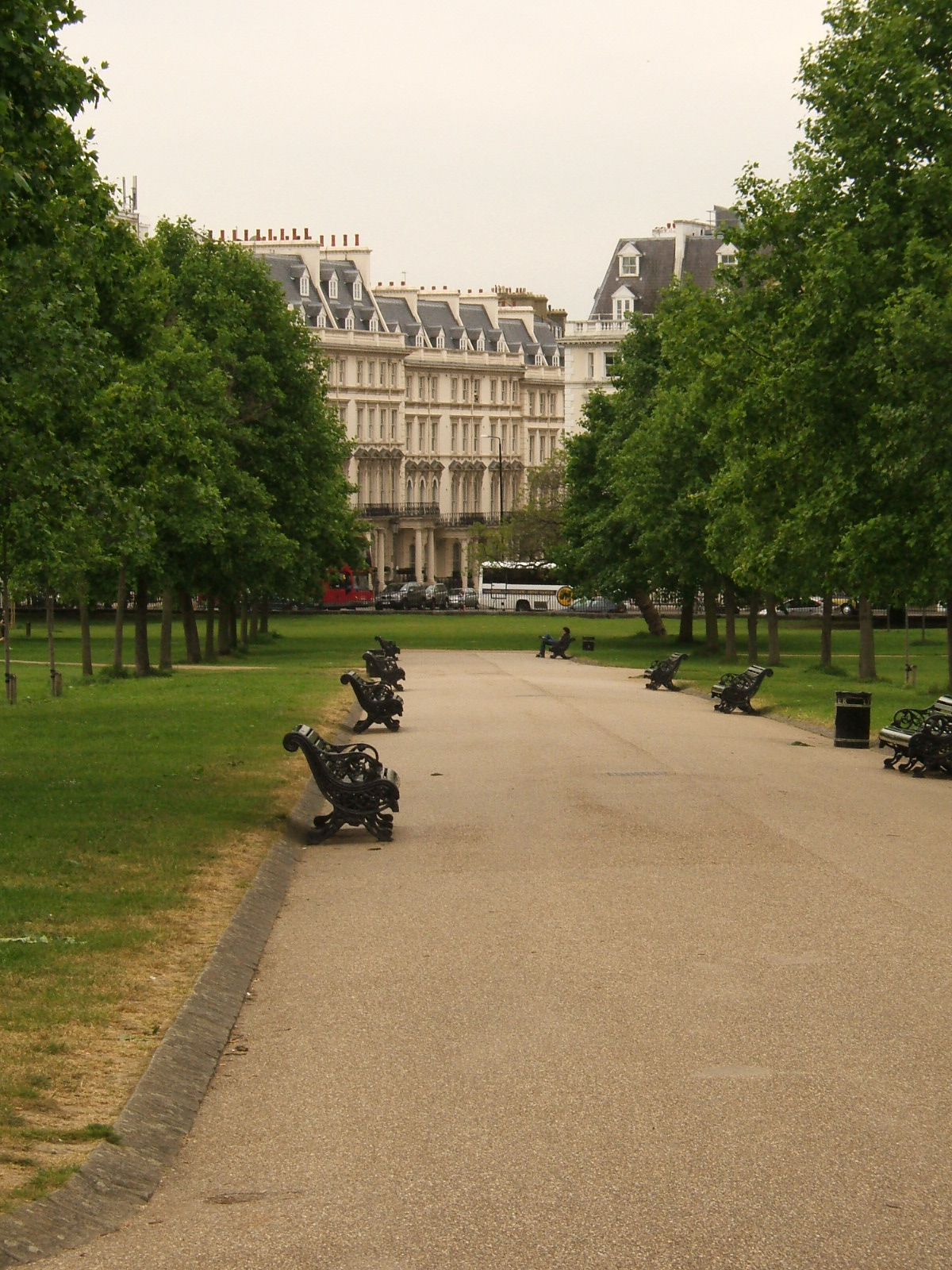
Kensington Gardens

== See also ==
- List of public art in Kensington Gardens
