= Moorbank Botanic Gardens =

University botanical garden in Newcastle upon Tyne, England

Moorbank Botanic Garden
- Interactive map of Moorbank Botanic Garden
- Type: Botanical Garden
- Location: Newcastle upon Tyne, NE2 4NL, UK
- Coordinates: 54.987°N 1.635°W
- Area: 3 hectares (7.4 acres)
- Opened: 1923
- Closed: 2013
- Owner: Newcastle University
- Operator: Friends of Moorbank Garden
- Status: Closed

The Moorbank Botanic Garden was a university botanical garden in Newcastle upon Tyne, England. It occupied a 3 hectares (7.4 acres) site on Claremont Road to the west of the main Newcastle University campus, and was developed in the 1920s. Moorbank was leased from the Freemen of Newcastle until 2013, when the lease was not renewed and gardens were closed.

== History ==
The first plants at Moorbank were grown in 1923. The area under cultivation was extended in 1980 using plants from the collection of Randle Cooke, a plant collector from Corbridge, who bequeathed his garden to the university. The glasshouse complex was erected in 1985 and held collections of tropical and desert plants.

It was announced in 2012 that Newcastle University would be withdrawing its support for the facility as botany was no longer so important in its research profile. The gardens closed in November 2013.

=== Uses ===
The glasshouses were divided into cool areas (8–10 °C in winter) and warmer areas (min 16 °C in winter). They contain plants being used for research. Outside were formal plantings and collections of rhododendron, potentilla and medicinal plants.

Through a volunteer network the garden was opened to the public on certain days via the National Gardens Scheme. The garden linked with Tyne and Wear Museums to provide environmental workshops for primary schools and was a venue for adult evening classes in painting and photography. In 2012, the garden received Heritage Lottery Fund funding to improve public access to the gardens.
