= Sioban Coppinger =

British sculptor

Sioban Coppinger (born 1955) is a Canadian-born English sculptor. She has created many sculptures by commission, which stand in locations in Britain.

== Life ==
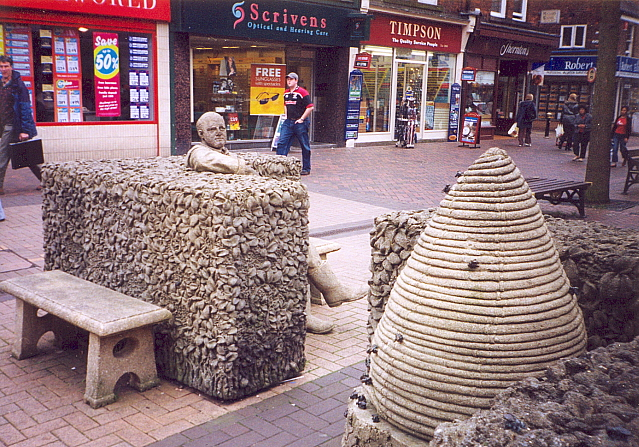
"The Beeston Seat", in Beeston, Nottingham

Coppinger was born in Canada, and studied at the Bath Academy of Art in England from 1974 to 1977, gaining an honours degree. She taught at Downe House School in Berkshire from 1991 to 1992. She has worked in the field of public sculpture for many years, and has exhibited uncommissioned works. She is a Fellow of the Royal Society of Sculptors, and a Fellow of the Royal Society of Arts.

== Works ==
Her works include the following:

"The Gardener and Truant Lion" is in Station Road, Stoke Mandeville, Buckinghamshire. Commissioned for the Chelsea Flower Show in 1986, it was an element in an exhibit by British Rail, whose postwar logo was a lion and wheel; here, the lion has wandered away from his post. The materials used are reinforced concrete and ferrocement. The work was afterwards loaned to the Stoke-on-Trent Garden Festival of 1986, and then was permanently sited at Stoke Mandeville railway station.

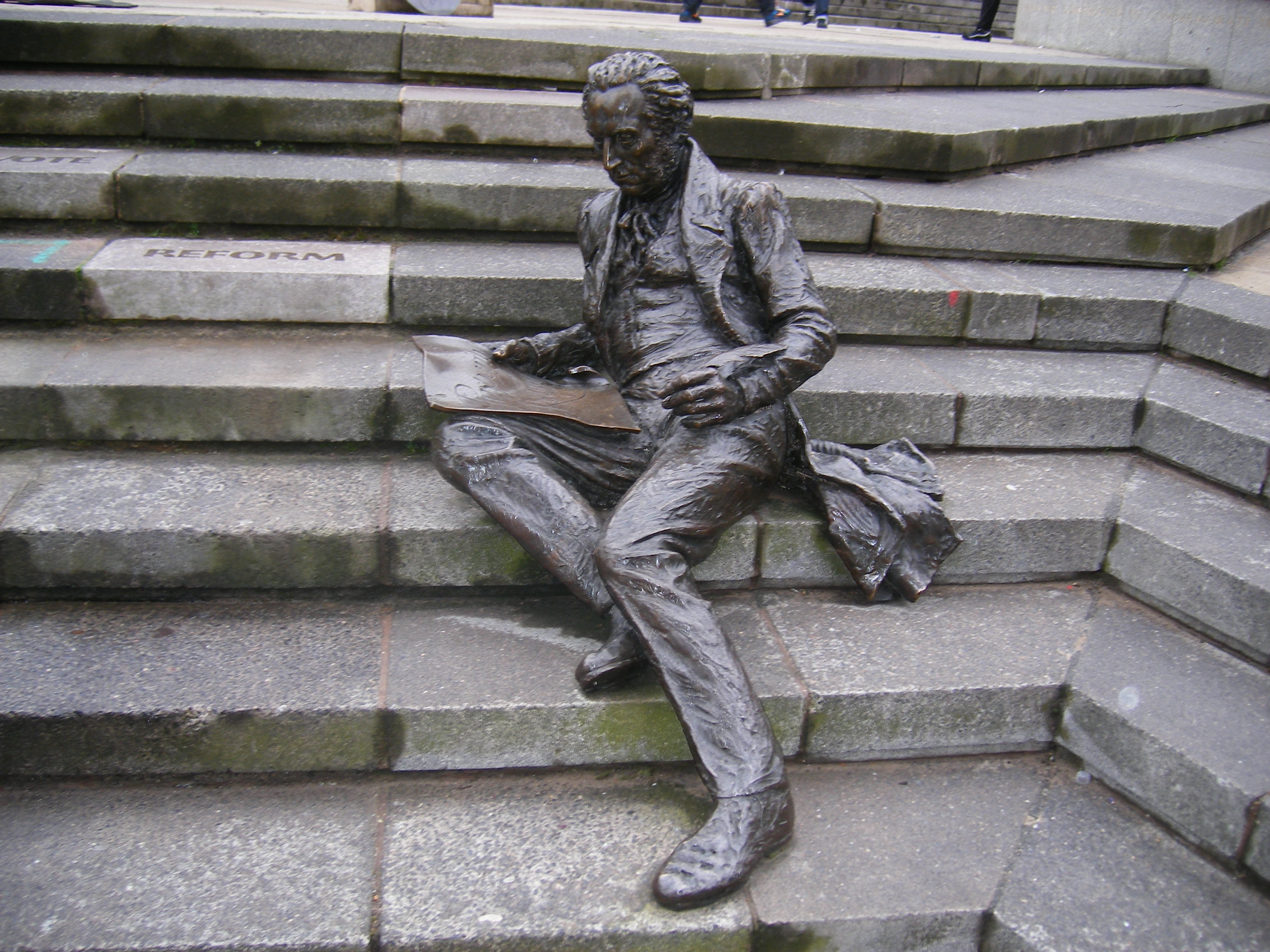
"Birmingham Man": statue of Thomas Attwood, in Chamberlain Square, Birmingham

"The Beeston Seat", of 1987, was commissioned by Broxtowe Borough Council, and it is situated in High Road, Beeston, Nottinghamshire. There are two L-shaped hedges; on a bench in the corner of one of them, a statue of an elderly man is seated, with a beekeeper's hat and gloves next to him. In the corner of the other hedge, a beehive and bees are on a tree-stump. The figure was modelled on a friend of the sculptor who could exude calm when others were stressed. The materials used are reinforced concrete and bronze.

"Birmingham Man" is a statue of the economist and politician Thomas Attwood in Chamberlain Square in Birmingham, unveiled by Priscille Mitchell, Attwood's great-great-granddaughter, in 1993. It was designed in collaboration with Fiona Peever. Attwood is shown sitting on the steps of the square, reading his notes.
