= Diana, Princess of Wales Memorial Walk =

Walking trail in London

Coordinates: 51.5050°N 0.1594°W

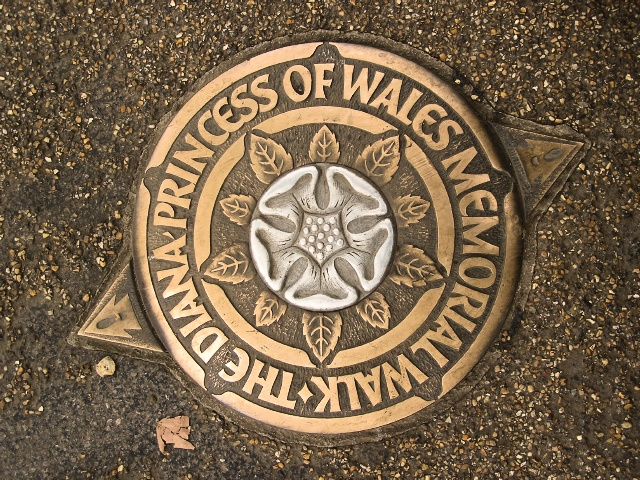
Diana, Princess of Wales Memorial Walk marker.

The Diana, Princess of Wales Memorial Walk is a 7-mile (11 km) long circular walking trail in central London, England, dedicated to the memory of Diana, Princess of Wales.

== Overview ==
The walk passes between Kensington Gardens, Hyde Park, Green Park and St. James's Park in a figure-eight pattern, passing five sites that are associated with Princess Diana's life: Kensington Palace, Spencer House, Buckingham Palace, St. James's Palace, and Clarence House. It is marked with ninety individual plaques, each of which has a heraldic rose etched in the centre made of aluminium. Chancellor of the Exchequer Gordon Brown, who was the Chairman of the Diana, Princess of Wales, Memorial Committee was quoted as saying it is "one of the most magnificent urban parkland walks in the world." The Diana, Princess of Wales Memorial Walk is in London, and celebrates the life of the Princess of Wales who died in a car accident on 31 August 1997 in Paris.

The walk was constructed at a cost of £1.3 million. No member of the Royal Family was present at its opening.

== See also ==
- Diana, Princess of Wales Memorial Fountain
- Diana, Princess of Wales Memorial Playground
