= Ducklington =

Village in Oxfordshire, England

Coordinates: 51.767°N 1.485°W

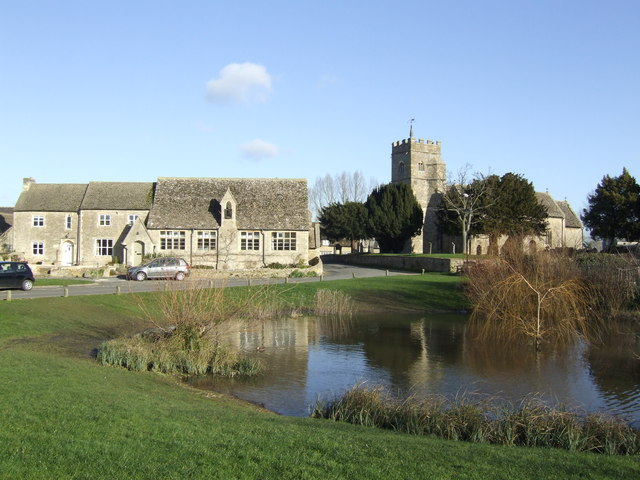
- Ducklington pond, parish church and former school

- Location within Oxfordshire
- Population: 1,581 (2011 Census)
- OS grid reference: SP3507
- Civil parish: Ducklington
- District: West Oxfordshire
- Shire county: Oxfordshire
- Region: South East
- Country: England
- Sovereign state: United Kingdom
- Post town: Witney
- Postcode district: OX29
- Dialling code: 01993
- Police: Thames Valley
- Fire: Oxfordshire
- Ambulance: South Central
- UK Parliament: Witney
- Website: Ducklington Parish Council

Ducklington is a village and civil parish on the River Windrush 1 mile (1.6 km) south of Witney in West Oxfordshire. The 2011 Census recorded the parish's population as 1,581.

== History ==
Ducklington is one of the earliest Saxon parishes to be recorded in Oxfordshire. In a charter of 958 King Edgar the Peaceful granted at Duclingtun to his Minister, Eanulf. An Anglo-Saxon charter from 1036 also records the toponym as Duclingtun, and another Anglo-Saxon document from 1044 records it as Ducelingdun. The Domesday Book of 1086 records it as Dochelintone and a charter from 1130 records it as Dukelindona. The name is derived from Old English. The first element may be from the name of a person called Ducca or Ducel. The element "-ing" most commonly means "people of". The element "-tūn" means an enclosure, homestead or village. The fact that the village has a duck pond with a population of ducks is purely incidental. After the Norman Conquest Ducklington was held by Robert D'Oyly, a Norman nobleman who took part in William I's conquest of England. The Dyve family then held the Lordship of Ducklington throughout the 13th and 14th centuries, living there until early in the reign of Edward III.

The Church of England parish church of Saint Bartholomew is 12th century. The Gothic Revival architect EG Bruton restored the building in 1871. The bell tower has a ring of six bells. William and Henry III Bagley of Chacombe in Northamptonshire cast the second, fourth and fifth bells in 1708. Robert Taylor & Sons cast the tenor bell in 1829, presumably at their then foundry in Oxford. Mears and Stainbank of the Whitechapel Bell Foundry cast the treble bell in 1889. The Royal Eijsbouts bell foundry of Asten in the Netherlands cast the third bell in 1988. The village had a Baptist Chapel until 2016, when it was converted into a private home. The former village schoolhouse was built in 1858. The modern Ducklington Church of England Primary School is across the village green from the original site.

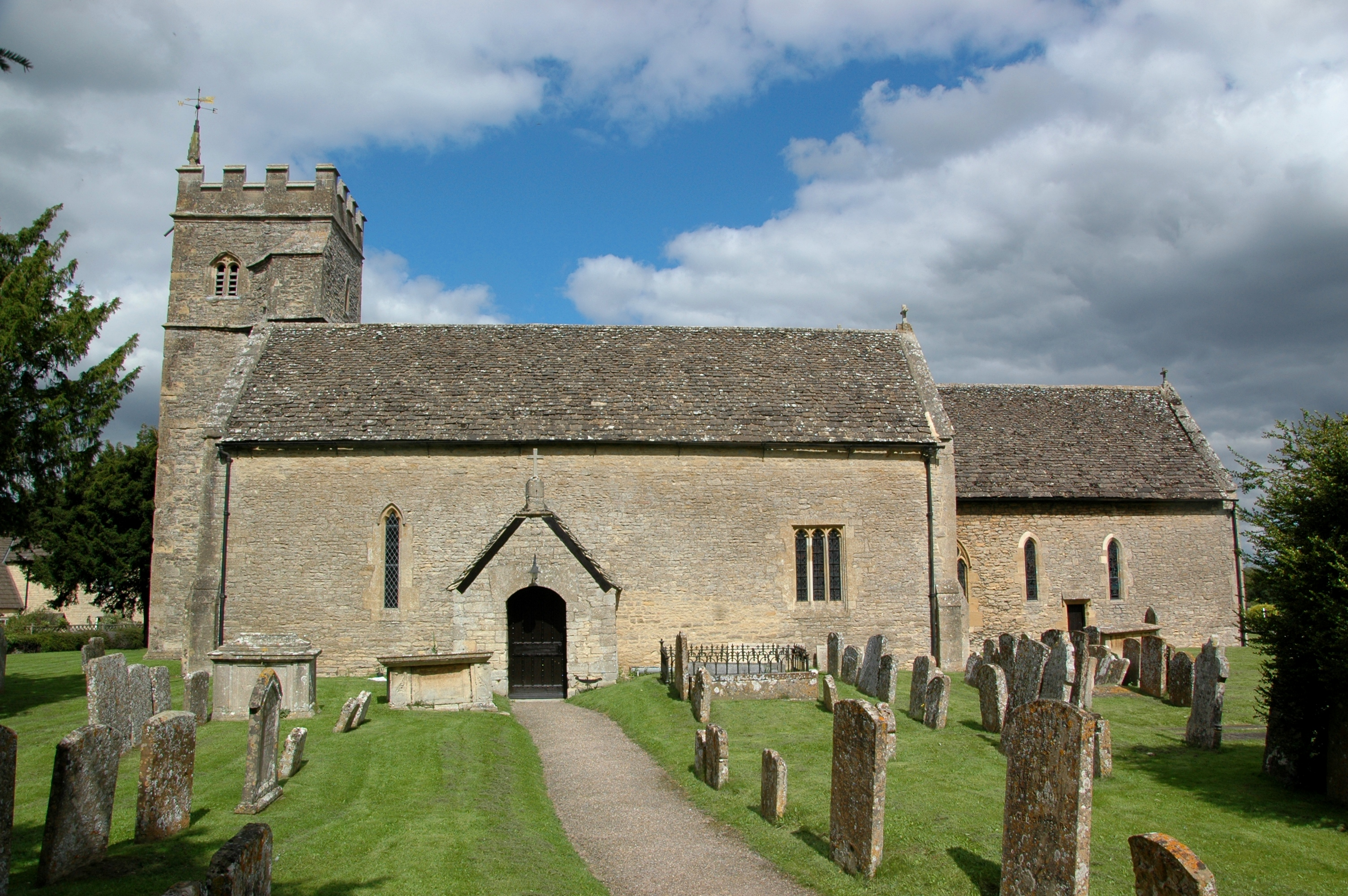
St Bartholomew's parish church

== Natural history ==
Ducklington is notable for the rare fritillary flower (mainly of the snake's head variety), many of which grow in a specially designated meadow just outside the village. Before the Second World War many fritillaries had grown on fields all over the Windrush Valley. However, the national drive for food production during the war meant that most meadows were intensively ploughed, the rivers dredged, and consequently the fritillaries were lost. Only the current fritillary field happened to be left unploughed. The flowers have survived with help from both locals and farmers. Once a year, the local community celebrates Fritillary Sunday when the field, parish church and hall are opened so that the public may walk among and enjoy the flowers.

== Amenities ==
Ducklington has a Morris dancing side and Mummers performances. It also has its own Morris Dance tradition; its own style of dance that was collected around the beginning of the 19th century. The Ducklington tradition is danced by many sides throughout Britain and the United States. Ducklington has one public house: The Bell, and a sports and social club. Ducklington has hosted several flower and garden shows. The former tithe barn is now the village hall, which has been renovated in the last few years. It is used by village groups including the Parish Council and is the parish polling station in local and national elections. Ducklington has a Women's Institute.

== Sports ==
Ducklington Sports and Social Club football teams. They include two men's football teams that compete in the Witney and District League. Ducklington's football first XI is in the Witney and District Division one. The club has eleven youth teams. The cricket section has sadly disbanded due to a lack of interest.

== Sources ==
- Crossley, Alan; Currie, CRJ; Baggs, AP; Chance, Eleanor; Colvin, Christina; Day, C.J.; Selwyn, Nesta; Townley, Simon C (1996). "Ducklington". A History of the County of Oxford. Victoria County History. Vol. 13: Bampton Hundred (Part One). pp. 110–150. ISBN 978-0-19722-790-9.
- Ekwall, Eilert (1960) [1936]. Concise Oxford Dictionary of English Place-Names (4th ed.). Oxford: Oxford University Press. Ducklington. ISBN 0198691033.
- Sherwood, Jennifer; Pevsner, Nikolaus (1974). Oxfordshire. The Buildings of England. Harmondsworth: Penguin Books. pp. 588–590. ISBN 0-14-071045-0.
