= Diana, Princess of Wales Memorial Playground =

Memorial to Diana, Princess of Wales, in Kensington Gardens, London

Coordinates: 51°30′33″N 0°11′18″W

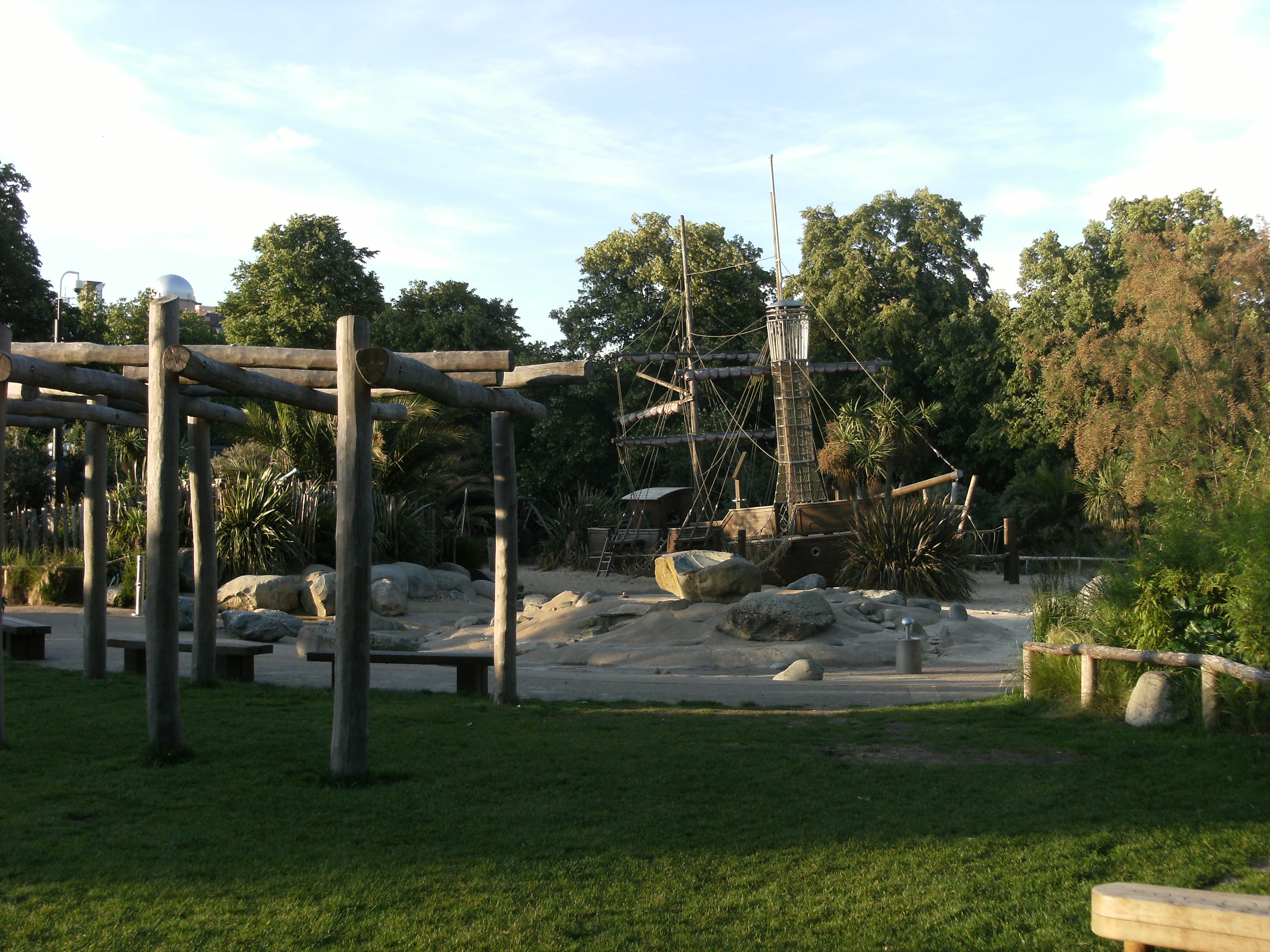
The playground in 2011

The Diana, Princess of Wales Memorial Playground is a memorial to Diana, Princess of Wales, in Kensington Gardens, in the Royal Borough of Kensington and Chelsea, London. It opened in 2000 and is situated at the north western corner of Kensington Gardens, in sight of the Princess's former residence at Kensington Palace. It is adjacent to the Broad Walk of Kensington Gardens.

It was erected after her death at a cost of £1.7 million on the site of the existing Peter Pan children's playground which had been founded in the time of J. M. Barrie (author of Peter Pan in Kensington Gardens), but it is larger and more elaborate than the original. The design, by LUC (Land Use Consultants), was inspired by Barrie's Peter Pan. Its most prominent feature is a full-scale wooden pirate ship which serves as a climbing area for children, and is surrounded by sand in which they can play. Other features include slides, swings, and an area designed for those with disabilities, including fragrant plants and sound features (for those with visual disabilities). The playground is an example of a "natural play" concept, designed to stimulate children's imagination, sense of adventure, and to encourage them to challenge their physical and mental powers.

The playground closed in October 2025 for a £3 million refurbishment by the Royal Parks and reopened on 5 August 2026. The redevelopment replaced the original pirate ship with a new 17-metre wooden galleon built from mountain larch in Germany and introduced a new treehouse, a redesigned water play area, an under-threes zone, and improved accessibility features, including wheelchair-accessible play equipment, an accessible path, and raised water and sand play tables. The refurbishment also added sensory planting and upgraded musical play features, while incorporating sustainably sourced timber and rainwater collection for irrigation.
