= List of United Kingdom locations: Hi-Highr =

The United Kingdom

This is part of the list of United Kingdom locations: a gazetteer of place names in the United Kingdom showing each place's locality and geographical coordinates.

== Hi ==
=== Hib – Hif ===
Location	Locality	Coordinates (links to map & photo sources)	OS grid reference
Hibaldstow	North Lincolnshire	53.50°N 00.53°W	SE9702
Hibb's Green	Suffolk	52.14°N 00.73°E	TL8753
Hickford Hill	Essex	52.06°N 00.59°E	TL7844
Hickleton	Doncaster	53.53°N 01.27°W	SE4805
Hickling	Norfolk	52.75°N 01.57°E	TG4123
Hickling	Nottinghamshire	52.85°N 00.97°W	SK6929
Hickling Green	Norfolk	52.75°N 01.55°E	TG4023
Hickling Heath	Norfolk	52.74°N 01.55°E	TG4022
Hickling Pastures	Nottinghamshire	52.84°N 01.02°W	SK6628
Hickmans Green	Kent	51.28°N 00.95°E	TR0658
Hicks Forstal	Kent	51.32°N 01.12°E	TR1863
Hicks Gate	City of Bristol	51.41°N 02.53°W	ST6369
Hick's Mill	Cornwall	50.21°N 05.14°W	SW7640
Hickstead	West Sussex	50.96°N 00.20°W	TQ2620
Hidcote Bartrim	Gloucestershire	52.07°N 01.75°W	SP1742
Hidcote Boyce	Gloucestershire	52.06°N 01.75°W	SP1741
Hifnal	Shropshire	52.58°N 02.44°W	SO7099

=== Hig – High D ===
Location	Locality	Coordinates (links to map & photo sources)	OS grid reference
Higginshaw	Oldham	53.55°N 02.10°W	SD9306
High Ackworth	Wakefield	53.64°N 01.33°W	SE4417
Higham (Forest Heath)	Suffolk	52.25°N 00.54°E	TL7465
Higham (Babergh)	Suffolk	51.97°N 00.95°E	TM0335
Higham	Kent	51.41°N 00.45°E	TQ7171
Higham	Lancashire	53.82°N 02.30°W	SD8036
Higham	Barnsley	53.55°N 01.53°W	SE3107
Higham	Derbyshire	53.12°N 01.41°W	SK3959
Higham Common	Barnsley	53.55°N 01.53°W	SE3106
Higham Ferrers	Northamptonshire	52.30°N 00.59°W	SP9668
Higham Gobion	Bedfordshire	51.97°N 00.39°W	TL1032
Higham Hill	Waltham Forest	51.59°N 00.03°W	TQ3690
Higham on the Hill	Leicestershire	52.55°N 01.44°W	SP3895
Highampton	Devon	50.81°N 04.15°W	SS4804
Highams Park	Waltham Forest	51.60°N 00.02°W	TQ3791
Higham Wood	Kent	51.20°N 00.28°E	TQ6048
High Angerton	Northumberland	55.15°N 01.86°W	NZ0985
High Ardwell	Dumfries and Galloway	54.76°N 05.00°W	NX0745
High Bankhill	Cumbria	54.77°N 02.68°W	NY5642
High Banton	North Lanarkshire	55.99°N 04.02°W	NS7480
High Barn	Lincolnshire	53.15°N 00.03°E	TF3664
High Barnet	Barnet	51.64°N 00.20°W	TQ2496
High Beach	Essex	51.65°N 00.02°E	TQ4097
High Bentham	North Yorkshire	54.11°N 02.52°W	SD6669
High Bickington	Devon	50.96°N 04.00°W	SS5920
High Biggins	Cumbria	54.19°N 02.61°W	SD6078
High Birkwith	North Yorkshire	54.19°N 02.30°W	SD8076
High Birstwith	North Yorkshire	54.01°N 01.66°W	SE2258
High Bonnybridge	Falkirk	55.99°N 03.87°W	NS8379
High Bradfield	Sheffield	53.42°N 01.61°W	SK2692
High Bradley	North Yorkshire	53.93°N 02.00°W	SE0049
High Bray	Devon	51.09°N 03.87°W	SS6934
Highbridge	Somerset	51.21°N 02.97°W	ST3247
Highbridge	Hampshire	50.98°N 01.33°W	SU4721
Highbridge	Cumbria	54.77°N 02.94°W	NY3943
Highbridge	Walsall	52.63°N 01.97°W	SK0204
Highbridge	Highland	56.88°N 04.97°W	NN1981
Highbrook	West Sussex	51.05°N 00.06°W	TQ3630
High Brooms	Kent	51.14°N 00.27°E	TQ5941
High Brotheridge	Gloucestershire	51.81°N 02.16°W	SO8913
High Bullen	Devon	50.96°N 04.09°W	SS5320
Highburton	Kirklees	53.61°N 01.71°W	SE1913
Highbury	Somerset	51.23°N 02.44°W	ST6949
Highbury	City of Portsmouth	50.83°N 01.06°W	SU6604
Highbury	Islington	51.54°N 00.11°W	TQ3185
Highbury Vale	Nottinghamshire	52.99°N 01.19°W	SK5444
High Buston	Northumberland	55.36°N 01.63°W	NU2308
High Callerton	Northumberland	55.02°N 01.75°W	NZ1670
High Cark	Cumbria	54.23°N 02.95°W	SD3882
High Casterton	Cumbria	54.19°N 02.58°W	SD6278
High Catton	East Riding of Yorkshire	53.96°N 00.91°W	SE7153
High Church	Northumberland	55.15°N 01.70°W	NZ1985
Highclere	Hampshire	51.33°N 01.38°W	SU4360
Highcliffe	Dorset	50.73°N 01.70°W	SZ2193
Highcliffe	Derbyshire	53.28°N 01.68°W	SK2177
High Cogges	Oxfordshire	51.77°N 01.46°W	SP3709
High Common	Norfolk	52.60°N 00.93°E	TF9905
High Coniscliffe	Darlington	54.53°N 01.66°W	NZ2215
High Crompton	Oldham	53.57°N 02.12°W	SD9209
High Cross	Hampshire	51.02°N 00.98°W	SU7126
High Cross	East Sussex	51.03°N 00.22°E	TQ5628
High Cross	West Sussex	50.93°N 00.23°W	TQ2417
High Cross	Cornwall	50.10°N 05.16°W	SW7428
High Cross	Warwickshire	52.30°N 01.72°W	SP1967
High Cross	Cambridgeshire	52.21°N 00.07°E	TL4259
High Cross (Thundridge)	Hertfordshire	51.84°N 00.02°W	TL3618
High Cross (Aldenham)	Hertfordshire	51.66°N 00.35°W	TQ1498
High Cross	City of Newport	51.58°N 03.04°W	ST2888
High Crosshill	City of Glasgow	55.81°N 04.21°W	NS6160
High Cunsey	Cumbria	54.33°N 02.95°W	SD3894
High Curley	Surrey	51.34°N 00.69°W	SU9161
High Dubmire	Durham	54.83°N 01.50°W	NZ3249
High Dyke	Durham	54.62°N 02.07°W	NY9525

=== High E, including Higher ===
Location	Locality	Coordinates (links to map & photo sources)	OS grid reference
High Easter	Essex	51.80°N 00.34°E	TL6214
High Eggborough	North Yorkshire	53.69°N 01.13°W	SE5722
High Ellington	North Yorkshire	54.24°N 01.70°W	SE1983
High Elms	Bromley	51.348°N 00.071°E	TQ443630
Higher Alham	Somerset	51.16°N 02.47°W	ST6741
Higher Ansty	Dorset	50.82°N 02.34°W	ST7603
Higher Ashton	Devon	50.64°N 03.62°W	SX8584
Higher Audley	Lancashire	53.73°N 02.47°W	SD6927
Higher Bal	Cornwall	50.30°N 05.23°W	SW7050
Higher Ballam	Lancashire	53.76°N 02.98°W	SD3530
Higher Bartle	Lancashire	53.79°N 02.76°W	SD5033
Higher Bebington	Wirral	53.35°N 03.03°W	SJ3185
Higher Berry End	Bedfordshire	51.99°N 00.57°W	SP9834
Higher Blackley	Manchester	53.53°N 02.24°W	SD8404
Higher Boarshaw	Rochdale	53.55°N 02.19°W	SD8706
Higher Bockhampton	Dorset	50.72°N 02.39°W	SY7292
Higher Boscaswell	Cornwall	50.14°N 05.66°W	SW3834
Higher Brixham	Devon	50.38°N 03.52°W	SX9255
Higher Broughton	Salford	53.49°N 02.27°W	SD8200
Higher Burrow	Somerset	50.97°N 02.85°W	ST4020
Higher Burrowtown	Devon	50.76°N 03.41°W	SY0097
Higher Burwardsley	Cheshire	53.09°N 02.71°W	SJ5256
High Ercall	Shropshire	52.74°N 02.60°W	SJ5917
Higher Chalmington	Dorset	50.80°N 02.58°W	ST5901
Higher Cheriton	Devon	50.79°N 03.27°W	ST1000
Higher Chillington	Somerset	50.88°N 02.88°W	ST3810
Higher Chisworth	Stockport	53.41°N 02.01°W	SJ9991
Highercliff	Cornwall	50.38°N 04.47°W	SX2457
Higher Clovelly	Devon	50.98°N 04.40°W	SS3123
Higher Condurrow	Cornwall	50.20°N 05.28°W	SW6639
Higher Crackington	Cornwall	50.72°N 04.62°W	SX1595
Higher Cransworth	Cornwall	50.47°N 04.87°W	SW9668
Higher Croft	Lancashire	53.72°N 02.48°W	SD6826
Higher Denham	Buckinghamshire	51.57°N 00.52°W	TQ0287
Higher Dinting	Derbyshire	53.44°N 01.97°W	SK0294
Higher Disley	Cheshire	53.35°N 02.04°W	SJ9784
Higher Downs	Cornwall	50.11°N 05.42°W	SW5530
Higher Durston	Somerset	51.04°N 03.02°W	ST2828
Higher End	Wigan	53.52°N 02.72°W	SD5203
Higher Eype	Dorset	50.72°N 02.79°W	SY4492
Higher Folds	Wigan	53.49°N 02.48°W	SD6800
Higherford	Lancashire	53.85°N 02.21°W	SD8640
Higher Gabwell	Devon	50.51°N 03.52°W	SX9269
Higher Green	Wigan	53.49°N 02.45°W	SD7000
Higher Halstock Leigh	Dorset	50.86°N 02.69°W	ST5107
Higher Heysham	Lancashire	54.03°N 02.90°W	SD4160
Higher Hogshead	Lancashire	53.69°N 02.18°W	SD8822
Higher Holton	Somerset	51.04°N 02.45°W	ST6827
Higher Hurdsfield	Cheshire	53.26°N 02.10°W	SJ9374
Higher Kingcombe	Dorset	50.78°N 02.65°W	SY5499
Higher Kinnerton	Flintshire	53.14°N 03.01°W	SJ3261
Higher Marsh	Somerset	50.97°N 02.38°W	ST7320
Higher Melcombe	Dorset	50.81°N 02.37°W	ST7402
Higher Metcombe	Devon	50.72°N 03.33°W	SY0692
Higher Molland	Devon	51.08°N 03.85°W	SS7033
Higher Muddiford	Devon	51.12°N 04.07°W	SS5538
Higher Nyland	Somerset	50.99°N 02.38°W	ST7322
Higher Penwortham	Lancashire	53.74°N 02.74°W	SD5128
Higher Pertwood	Wiltshire	51.11°N 02.17°W	ST8835
Higher Porthpean	Cornwall	50.31°N 04.78°W	SX0250
Higher Poynton	Cheshire	53.34°N 02.09°W	SJ9483
Higher Prestacott	Devon	50.74°N 04.28°W	SX3996
Higher Rads End	Bedfordshire	51.97°N 00.55°W	SP9932
Higher Ridge	Shropshire	52.89°N 02.96°W	SJ3533
Higher Rocombe Barton	Devon	50.50°N 03.53°W	SX9168
Higher Row	Dorset	50.83°N 01.94°W	SU0404
Higher Runcorn	Cheshire	53.33°N 02.73°W	SJ5182
Higher Sandford	Dorset	50.97°N 02.54°W	ST6220
Higher Shotton	Flintshire	53.19°N 03.04°W	SJ3067
Higher Shurlach	Cheshire	53.24°N 02.49°W	SJ6772
Higher Slade	Devon	51.19°N 04.14°W	SS5046
Higher Street	Somerset	51.17°N 03.24°W	ST1342
Higher Tale	Devon	50.80°N 03.33°W	ST0601
Higher Tolcarne	Cornwall	50.44°N 04.98°W	SW8865
Higher Totnell	Dorset	50.87°N 02.54°W	ST6208
Higher Town	Somerset	51.20°N 03.49°W	SS9646
Highertown (Advent)	Cornwall	50.600°N 04.658°W	SX120812
Highertown (Truro)	Cornwall	50.25°N 05.08°W	SW8044
Higher Town (Roche)	Cornwall	50.416°N 04.815°W	SX003614
Higher Town	Isles of Scilly	49.95°N 06.29°W	SV9215
Higher Tremarcoombe	Cornwall	50.49°N 04.46°W	SX2569
Higher Vexford	Somerset	51.10°N 03.28°W	ST1035
Higher Walton	Lancashire	53.73°N 02.65°W	SD5727
Higher Walton	Cheshire	53.36°N 02.61°W	SJ5985
Higher Wambrook	Somerset	50.86°N 03.01°W	ST2908
Higher Warcombe	Devon	51.18°N 04.19°W	SS4745
Higher Weaver	Devon	50.82°N 03.35°W	ST0504
Higher Whatcombe	Dorset	50.80°N 02.24°W	ST8301
Higher Wheelton	Lancashire	53.69°N 02.59°W	SD6122
Higher Whitley	Cheshire	53.31°N 02.58°W	SJ6180
Higher Wincham	Cheshire	53.28°N 02.48°W	SJ6876
Higher Woodsford	Dorset	50.70°N 02.34°W	SY7689
Higher Wraxall	Dorset	50.80°N 02.62°W	ST5601
Higher Wych	Wrexham	52.98°N 02.76°W	SJ4943
High Etherley	Durham	54.64°N 01.75°W	NZ1628

=== High F – High R ===
Location	Locality	Coordinates (links to map & photo sources)	OS grid reference
High Ferry	Lincolnshire	53.02°N 00.01°E	TF3549
Highfield	City of Southampton	50.92°N 01.40°W	SU4214
Highfield	Oxfordshire	51.90°N 01.17°W	SP5723
Highfield	Hertfordshire	51.76°N 00.46°W	TL0608
Highfield	Gloucestershire	51.72°N 02.52°W	SO6403
Highfield	Gateshead	54.91°N 01.78°W	NZ1458
High Field	Lancashire	53.96°N 02.42°W	SD7252
Highfield	East Riding of Yorkshire	53.81°N 00.90°W	SE7236
Highfield	Sheffield	53.36°N 01.47°W	SK3585
Highfield	Wigan	53.52°N 02.68°W	SD5503
Highfield	Bolton	53.54°N 02.43°W	SD7105
Highfield	North Ayrshire	55.71°N 04.70°W	NS3050
Highfields	Cambridgeshire	52.20°N 00.02°W	TL3558
Highfields	Essex	51.82°N 00.69°E	TL8617
Highfields	Gloucestershire	51.67°N 02.34°W	ST7697
Highfields	Doncaster	53.54°N 01.20°W	SE5306
Highfields	Derbyshire	53.18°N 01.37°W	SK4265
Highfields	Staffordshire	52.78°N 02.13°W	SJ9121
Highfields	City of Leicester	52.63°N 01.11°W	SK6004
Highfields	Northumberland	55.77°N 02.01°W	NT9954
High Flatts	Kirklees	53.55°N 01.68°W	SE2107
High Forge	Durham	54.88°N 01.65°W	NZ2254
High Friarside	Durham	54.89°N 01.75°W	NZ1656
High Gallowhill	East Dunbartonshire	55.92°N 04.17°W	NS6472
High Gardham	East Riding of Yorkshire	53.85°N 00.56°W	SE9440
High Garrett	Essex	51.90°N 00.57°E	TL7726
Highgate	Barnsley	53.52°N 01.32°W	SE4503
Highgate	Birmingham	52.46°N 01.89°W	SP0785
Highgate	Camden	51.56°N 00.15°W	TQ2887
Highgate	East Sussex	51.08°N 00.02°E	TQ4234
Highgate	Kent	51.04°N 00.50°E	TQ7630
Highgate	Powys	52.54°N 03.31°W	SO1195
High Grange	Durham	54.67°N 01.73°W	NZ1731
High Green	Shropshire	52.44°N 02.44°W	SO7083
High Green	Suffolk	52.20°N 00.70°E	TL8560
High Green	Worcestershire	52.10°N 02.19°W	SO8745
High Green	Cumbria	54.41°N 02.91°W	NY4103
High Green	Sheffield	53.46°N 01.50°W	SK3397
High Green	Kirklees	53.62°N 01.71°W	SE1914
High Green (Great Melton)	Norfolk	52.60°N 01.14°E	TG1305
High Green (Bradenham)	Norfolk	52.62°N 00.85°E	TF9307
High Green (Fransham)	Norfolk	52.68°N 00.83°E	TF9214
High Halden	Kent	51.10°N 00.69°E	TQ8937
High Halstow	Kent	51.44°N 00.56°E	TQ7875
High Ham	Somerset	51.07°N 02.82°W	ST4231
High Handenhold	Durham	54.87°N 01.64°W	NZ2353
High Harrington	Cumbria	54.61°N 03.55°W	NY0025
High Harrogate	North Yorkshire	53.99°N 01.52°W	SE3155
High Haswell	Durham	54.78°N 01.44°W	NZ3643
High Hatton	Shropshire	52.81°N 02.58°W	SJ6124
High Hauxley	Northumberland	55.32°N 01.57°W	NU2703
High Hawsker	North Yorkshire	54.45°N 00.58°W	NZ9207
High Heath	Walsall	52.61°N 01.95°W	SK0302
High Heath	Shropshire	52.83°N 02.47°W	SJ6827
High Hesket	Cumbria	54.78°N 02.82°W	NY4744
High Hesleden	Durham	54.73°N 01.30°W	NZ4538
High Hill	Cumbria	54.59°N 03.16°W	NY2523
High Houses	Essex	51.79°N 00.43°E	TL6813
High Hoyland	Barnsley	53.58°N 01.59°W	SE2710
High Hunsley	East Riding of Yorkshire	53.80°N 00.55°W	SE9535
High Hurstwood	East Sussex	51.01637°N 0.12918°E	TQ4926
High Hutton	North Yorkshire	54.10°N 00.85°W	SE7568
High Ireby	Cumbria	54.72°N 03.21°W	NY2237
High Kelling	Norfolk	52.91°N 01.12°E	TG1040
High Kilburn	North Yorkshire	54.20°N 01.21°W	SE5179
Highland Boath	Highland	57.47°N 03.86°W	NH8844
Highlands	Dorset	50.71°N 02.78°W	SY4591
High Lane	Herefordshire	52.23°N 02.48°W	SO6760
High Lane	Stockport	53.36°N 02.07°W	SJ9585
Highlane	Derbyshire	53.33°N 01.40°W	SK4082
Highlane	Cheshire	53.20°N 02.18°W	SJ8868
High Lanes (Hayley)	Cornwall	50.18°N 05.41°W	SW5637
Highlanes (St Issey)	Cornwall	50.51°N 04.96°W	SW9072
Highlanes	Staffordshire	52.88°N 02.31°W	SJ7932
High Laver	Essex	51.75°N 00.20°E	TL5208
Highlaws	Cumbria	54.82°N 03.34°W	NY1449
Highleadon	Gloucestershire	51.90°N 02.35°W	SO7623
High Legh	Cheshire	53.34°N 02.45°W	SJ7083
Highleigh	West Sussex	50.77°N 00.80°W	SZ8498
High Leven	Stockton-on-Tees	54.50°N 01.32°W	NZ4412
Highley	Shropshire	52.44°N 02.38°W	SO7483
High Littleton	Bath and North East Somerset	51.32°N 02.51°W	ST6458
High Longthwaite	Cumbria	54.80°N 03.16°W	NY2546
High Lorton	Cumbria	54.61°N 03.30°W	NY1625
High Marishes	North Yorkshire	54.19°N 00.75°W	SE8178
High Marnham	Nottinghamshire	53.22°N 00.80°W	SK8070
High Melton	Doncaster	53.50°N 01.24°W	SE5001
High Mickley	Northumberland	54.94°N 01.89°W	NZ0761
Highmoor	Oxfordshire	51.55°N 00.99°W	SU7085
Highmoor	Cumbria	54.81°N 03.16°W	NY2547
High Moor	Lancashire	53.59°N 02.75°W	SD5011
High Moor	Derbyshire	53.31°N 01.31°W	SK4680
Highmoor Cross	Oxfordshire	51.55°N 01.00°W	SU6984
Highmoor Hill	Monmouthshire	51.59°N 02.78°W	ST4689
High Moorsley	Durham	54.79°N 01.48°W	NZ3345
Highnam	Gloucestershire	51.86°N 02.30°W	SO7919
Highnam Green	Gloucestershire	51.87°N 02.30°W	SO7920
High Nash	Gloucestershire	51.78°N 02.62°W	SO5710
High Newton	Cumbria	54.23°N 02.92°W	SD4082
High Newton-by-the-Sea	Northumberland	55.51°N 01.63°W	NU2325
High Nibthwaite	Cumbria	54.29°N 03.09°W	SD2989
Highoak	Norfolk	52.55°N 01.05°E	TG0700
High Oaks	Cumbria	54.31°N 02.58°W	SD6291
High Offley	Staffordshire	52.83°N 02.32°W	SJ7826
High Ongar	Essex	51.70°N 00.25°E	TL5603
High Onn	Staffordshire	52.74°N 02.26°W	SJ8216
High Onn Wharf	Staffordshire	52.74°N 02.25°W	SJ8316
High Park	Cumbria	54.30°N 02.72°W	SD5390
High Park	Sefton	53.64°N 02.96°W	SD3617
Highridge	City of Bristol	51.41°N 02.63°W	ST5669
Highridge	North Somerset	51.40°N 02.63°W	ST5667
High Risby	North Lincolnshire	53.61°N 00.62°W	SE9114
Highroad Well Moor	Calderdale	53.73°N 01.91°W	SE0626
High Roding	Essex	51.82°N 00.32°E	TL6017
High Rougham	Suffolk	52.22°N 00.80°E	TL9262
High Row (Matterdale)	Cumbria	54.58°N 02.97°W	NY3721
High Row (Allerdale)	Cumbria	54.70°N 03.01°W	NY3535
