= Highbridge =

Highbridge or High Bridge may refer to:

== United Kingdom ==
- Highbridge, Cumbria, a location
- Highbridge, Hampshire, England
- High Bridge (Hammersmith), a former bridge in London
- Highbridge, Somerset, a market town, England
  - Highbridge and Burnham railway station
- Highbridge, Scotland, a village in the Scottish Highlands
- Highbridge, West Midlands, a location
  - Highbridge Skirmish, a battle site there
- High Bridge, Knaresborough, over the River Nidd
- High Bridge, Lincoln, the oldest bridge in the United Kingdom which still has buildings on it
- High Bridge, Oxford, over the River Cherwell
- High Bridge, Reading, over the River Kennet

== United States ==
- High Bridge (New York City), connecting Highbridge, Bronx, to Washington Heights, Manhattan
  - Highbridge, Bronx, a neighborhood in New York City, US
  - Highbridge Park, Manhattan, New York, US
  - Highbridge (Metro-North station), a Metro-North employee stop and maintenance facility
- High Bridge (Kentucky River), a railroad bridge near Harrodsburg, Kentucky
  - High Bridge, Kentucky
- High Bridge, New Jersey
  - High Bridge (NJT station), a NJ Transit commuter rail station
- High Bridge, New York
- Highbridge, Wisconsin
- High Bridge (Appomattox River), an historic railroad bridge near Farmville, Virginia
  - Battle of High Bridge fought at that location
  - High Bridge Trail State Park
- High Bridge (Coatesville, Pennsylvania), in Chester County
- High Bridge (St. Paul), crossing the Mississippi River in St. Paul, Minnesota
- High Bridge (Latah Creek), rail bridge over Latah Creek connecting West Spokane to Spokane, Washington
- High Bridge is an alternate name for the Poughkeepsie Bridge, across the Hudson River in New York

== See also ==
- HighBridge, an audiobook imprint of Workman Publishing Company
- High Level Bridge (disambiguation)
- 高梁 (disambiguation)
- 高橋 (disambiguation)
