= High Cross =

High Cross may refer to:

- High cross, a free-standing Christian cross

== Places ==
England

- High Cross, Cambridgeshire, a location
- High Cross, Constantine, Cornwall
- High Cross, Truro, Cornwall
- High Cross, East Sussex, a location
- High Cross, Hampshire
- High Cross, East Hertfordshire, Hertfordshire
- High Cross, Hertsmere, a location in Hertfordshire
- High Cross, Leicestershire
- High Cross, Warwickshire, a location
- High Cross, West Sussex, a location

Northern Ireland

- High Cross, County Tyrone, a townland in County Tyrone, Northern Ireland

Wales

- High Cross, Newport

== Other ==
- High Cross, a finisher move performed by professional wrestler Sheamus
