= High Cross, Cornwall =

High Cross, Cornwall, may refer to:

- High Cross, Constantine, a hamlet in the Civil Parish of Constantine, Kerrier
- High Cross, Truro, also the name of a cobbled plaza in Truro
- High Cross Street, in the centre of St Austell, between Holy Trinity Church and the Railway line
- A residential road of the same name, south of the Newquay Road in St Columb Major
