= London United Busways v De Marchi =

UK employment law case

London United Busways Ltd v (1) Mr V De Marchi (2) Abellio London Ltd is a UK employment law case concerning the Transfer of Undertakings (Protection of Employment) Regulations 2006 (TUPE). The case involved an employee who objected to a transfer under TUPE regulation due to a detrimental change in working conditions but did not explicitly resign. The Employment Appeal Tribunal (EAT) held that in such circumstances, the employee's contract of employment is terminated, and they are considered to have been dismissed by the transferor, not the transferee.

== Facts ==
Mr. V. De Marchi was a bus driver for London United Busways based at the Stamford Brook garage, a 15-minute walk from his home. In 2019, the bus route he worked on was transferred to Abellio London. The transfer would have required De Marchi to relocate to the Battersea garage, increasing his commute time to over an hour.

De Marchi was presented with three options: transfer to Abellio, accept a new contract with London United Busways with different terms, or resign. De Marchi objected to the transfer to Abellio because of the longer commute. He also rejected the new contract offered by London United Busways. He did not want to resign and instead requested redundancy.

London United Busways asserted that De Marchi rejecting the transfer terminated his employment, while De Marchi maintained that he was not resigning and did not agree to the transfer.

== Judgment ==
The Employment Appeal Tribunal (EAT) upheld the Employment Tribunal's decision that De Marchi had been dismissed by the transferor, London United Busways, but for different reasons, and clarified the interplay between Regulation 4(7), 4(8) and 4(9) of TUPE.

The EAT found that the move to the Battersea garage constituted a substantial and detrimental change in working conditions. This gave De Marchi the right to treat his contract as terminated and thus be considered dismissed by the employer.

The judgment addressed the status of an employee who objects to a transfer but who elects to treat the contract as terminated, and found that the employee's objection prevents the transfer of the employment contract to the transferee. The EAT confirmed that in such cases the employee has a remedy against the transferor, not the transferee. The appeal and cross-appeal were therefore dismissed.

== See also ==
- UK labour law
