= High Bridge (Hammersmith) =

- Coordinates: 51°29′27.3″N 0°14′2.7″W
- OS grid reference: TQ227783
- Crossed: Hammersmith Creek
- Locale: London, England

Characteristics
- Design: Suspension bridge
- Material: Wood

History
- Built: 1541 (latest)
- Rebuilt: 1712, 1751, 1820, 1837
- Destroyed: 24 July 1944

High Bridge (also known as Bishop's Bridge) was a footbridge that crossed Hammersmith Creek in Hammersmith, London. First referenced in 1541, the bridge was rebuilt several times, notably in 1712, 1751, 1820 and 1837. The bridge was destroyed in 1944 by a flying bomb.

Today, the bridge is still marked by a raised hump in the gardens and a flowerbed in Furnival Gardens.

== History ==
Hammersmith Creek was once the mouth of Stamford Brook, running from King Street into the River Thames, separating the Lower Mall and Upper Mall.

The exact date of the bridge's construction is unknown. In 1541, the Fulham Court Rolls, mention a surrender, dated Whit Tuesday in that year, by Richard Arnold and Margaret his wife, of lands including an acre at "Highbridge, Hamersmyth". On 30 April 1550, Thomas Essex presented in respect of a wharf leading from "le Strond in Hamersmyth" to the bridge there called "le Highebridge". On 12 March 1648 or 1649, leave was given to Robert Oustler to let to farm his cottages "prope le High Bridge in Hamersmyth". On 17 October 1650, Court Rolls mention premises surrendered by James Reeve, bounded by the Thames on the south and the footway leading from the bridge called Highbridge on the north.

In 1712, the bridge was rebuilt by Bishop Henry Compton, nearly at Hammersmith Creek's confluence with the River Thames.

In 1751, a wooden foot-bridge spanning the creek was built by Bishop Thomas Sherlock, also known as the "Bishop's Bridge".

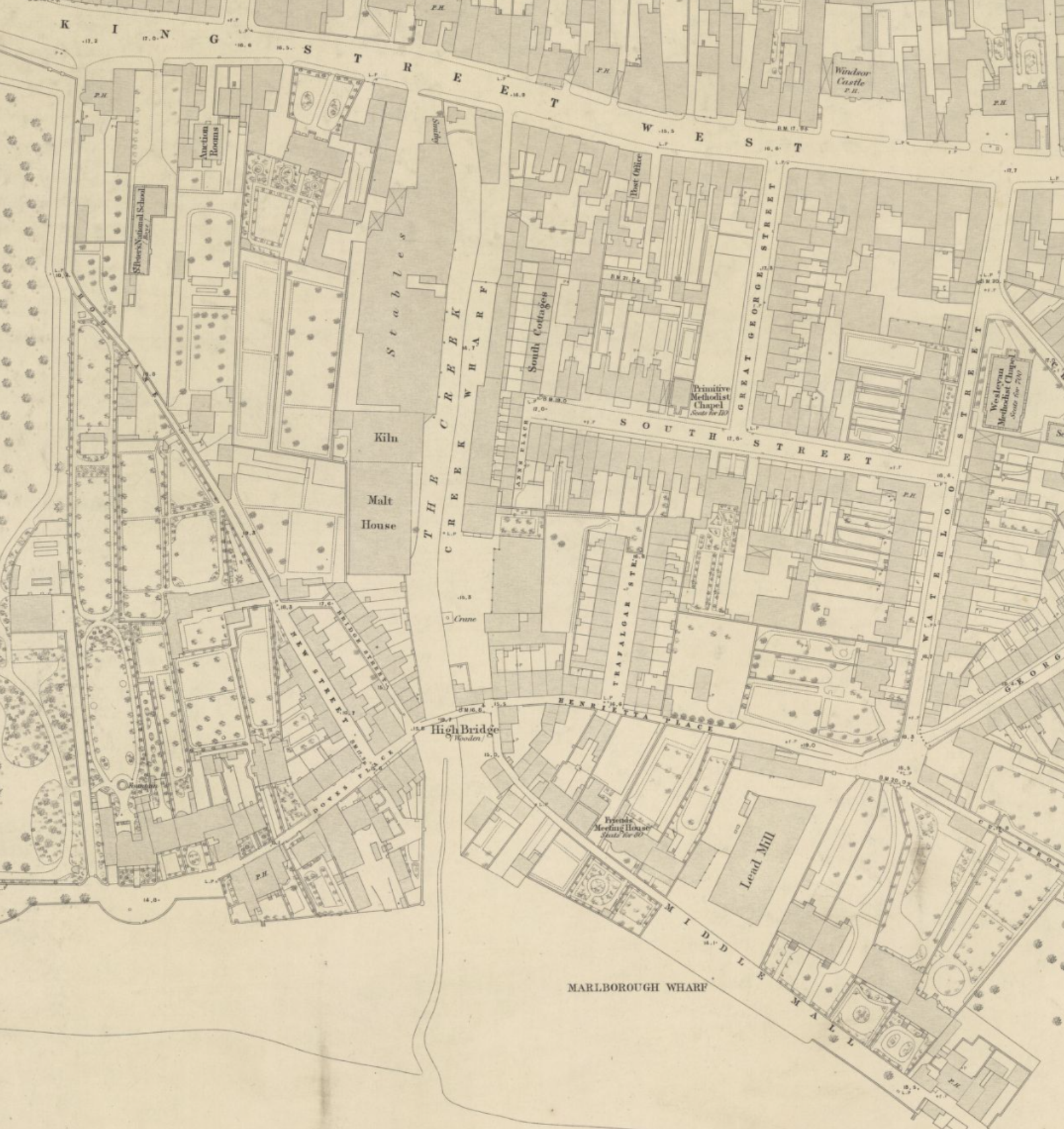
High Bridge labelled on an Ordnance Survey map (1866).

The bridge was rebuilt several times, by Bishop William Howley in 1820 and Bishop Charles Blomfield in 1837.

By 1915, the bridge converged four old footpaths and bridle paths (Lower Mall and Aspen Place on the east and Upper Mall and Bridge Street on the west).

On 24 July 1944, a flying bomb destroyed much of the area surrounding Hammersmith Creek and Little Wapping, including the bridge. Today, the bridge is still marked by a raised hump in the gardens and a flowerbed in Furnival Gardens.
