= Takahashi (disambiguation) =

Takahashi is a Japanese surname.

Takahashi may also refer to:

== Geographical locations ==
- Takahashi, Okayama (written 高梁), a city in Okayama prefecture, Japan
- Takahashi River, a river in Japan

== See also ==
- Ward-Takahashi identities, a feature of quantum mechanics
- The Takahashi correlation is an expression used in mass transfer equations for chemical engineering that corrects for high pressure in calculating diffusion coefficients between two molecules
- Takahashi method, a presentation style pioneered by Masayoshi Takahashi
- Takahashi Trading Company (1945–2019) Japanese imported home goods business, headquartered in San Francisco, California
- Takahashi Seisakusho, manufacturer of astronomical telescopes
- 高梁 (disambiguation)
- 高橋 (disambiguation)
