= High Green (disambiguation) =

High Green is a suburb of the English city of Sheffield.

It may also refer to the following, also in England:

- High Green, Cumbria, see List of places in Cumbria
- High Green, Norfolk, see List of places in Norfolk
- High Green, Shropshire
- High Green, Suffolk
- High Green, West Yorkshire
- High Green, Worcestershire
