= High Lane =

High Lane or Highlane may refer to:

- High Lane (film)
- High Lane, Greater Manchester, England
  - High Lane railway station
- High Lane, a hamlet on the border between Herefordshire and Worcestershire, England
- Highlane, Cheshire, a location in England
- Highlane, Derbyshire, England
- Highlanes, Cornwall, England
