= Toru Takahashi =

Toru Takahashi may refer to:

- Toru Takahashi (baseball) (高橋 徹, born 1987), Japanese baseball player
- Toru Takahashi (Internet) (高橋 徹, born 1941), Japanese computer network researcher and businessman
- Toru Takahashi (manager), CEO of Japan Post Holdings
- Toru Takahashi (racing driver) (高橋 徹, 1960–1983), Japanese racing driver

== See also ==
- See 高橋徹 on Japanese Wikipedia for a further list
- Takahashi (disambiguation)
- Toru (disambiguation)
