= Gaoqiao =

Gaoqiao (Chinese: 高桥; lit. 'high bridge') may refer to the following entities in China:

== Towns ==
- Gaoqiao, Sha County, in Anhui
- Gaoqiao, Kai County, in Chongqing
- Gaoqiao, Zunyi, in Huichuan District, Zunyi, Guizhou
- Gaoqiao, Tongzi County, in Guizhou
- Gaoqiao, Lianjiang County, in Guangdong
- Gaoqiao, Hong'an County, in Hubei
- Gaoqiao, Xianning, in Xian'an District, Xianning, Hubei
- Gaoqiao Town, Changsha, a town of Changsha County in Hunan.
- Gaoqiao, Cili County, in Hunan
- Gaoqiao, Xinning, in Xinning County, Hunan
- Gaoqiao, Zhenjiang, in Dantu District, Zhenjiang, Jiangsu
- Gaoqiao, Huludao, in Lianshan District, Huludao, Liaoning
- Gaoqiao, Ziyang County, in Shaanxi
- Gaoqiao, Yishui County, in Shandong
- Gaoqiao, Shanghai, in Pudong New District, Shanghai
- Gaoqiao, Emeishan City, in Sichuan
- Gaoqiao, Neijiang, in Dongxing District, Neijiang, Sichuan
- Gaoqiao, Wuding County, in Yunnan
- Gaoqiao, Fuyang, Zhejiang
- Gaoqiao, Ningbo, in Yinzhou District, Ningbo, Zhejiang
- Gaoqiao, Tongxiang, in Zhejiang

== Subdistricts ==
- Gaoqiao Subdistrict, Changsha, a subdistrict of Yuhua District, Changsha, Hunan province.
- Gaoqiao, Taizhou, a subdistrict of Huangyan District, Taizhou, Zhejiang province.

== Stations ==
Gaoqiao Station (高桥站)

- Gaoqiao Station (Ningbo), station on the No. 1 Line of the Ningbo Metro, in Zhejiang
- Gaoqiao Station (Lianjiang), the station for Lianjiang, Guangdong on the Jingguang Railway
- Gaoqiao station (Shanghai Metro), station on Phase II of Line 10 of the Shanghai Metro

== See also ==
- 高橋 (disambiguation)
