= Hammersmith Brewery =

Brewery in Hammersmith, London

- Interactive map of Hammersmith Brewery
- Type: Beer
- Location: London, United Kingdom
- Coordinates: 51°29′30″N 0°14′03″W
- Opened: 1780
- Closed: 1840
- Key people: Joseph Cromwell

The Hammersmith Brewery (also known as Cromwell's Brewery, Swail's Brewery or the Town Brewery) was a brewery in Hammersmith, London.

== History ==
The Hammersmith Brewery was built in 1780 by Joseph Cromwell, situated near the mouth of Hammersmith Creek. Ale was brewed there and distributed in Hammersmith and neighbouring parishes, especially to malt houses on the western side of the creek.

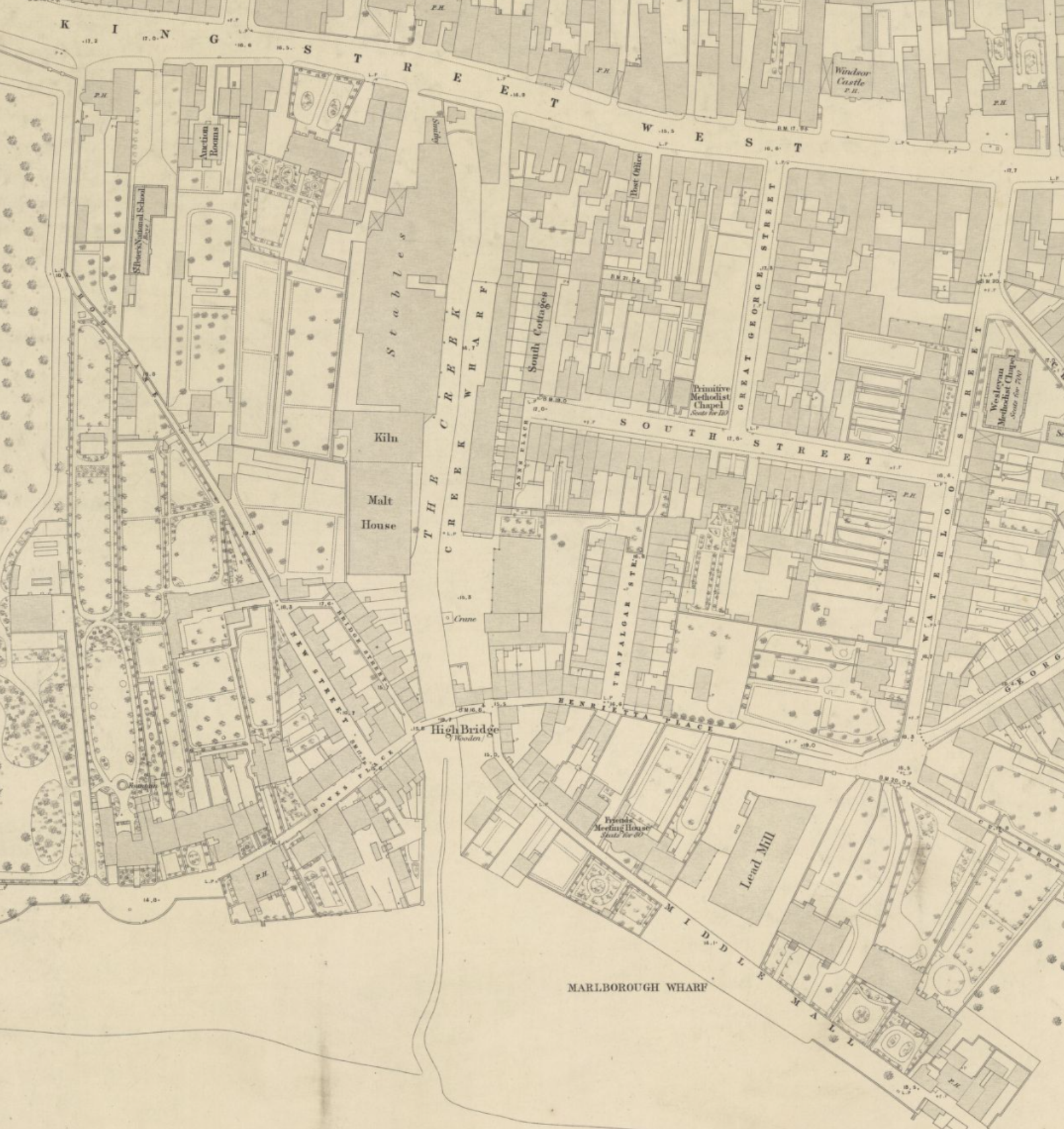
Hammersmith Creek Ordnance Survey 1866

By 1839, the brewery was run by Joseph's Cromwell's brother, James Cromwell.

Records for the brewery exist until 1842. On 25 March 1842, the brewery and the public houses 'Windsor Castle', 'Hampshire Hog' with house adjoining, and the 'Chaise and Horses', all on King Street, were leased by John Swail to John and Henry Sich.

The name of this local brewer is now preserved in Cromwell Mansions.
