= Wenquan, Chongqing =

Wenquan 温泉镇
- Town
- Location in Chongqing
- Coordinates: 31°22′00″N 108°31′01″E
- Country: People's Republic of China
- Municipality: Chongqing
- County: Kai
- Village-level divisions: 3 residential communities 11 villages
- Elevation: 225 m (738 ft)
- Time zone: UTC+8 (China Standard)

Wenquan (simplified Chinese: 温泉; traditional Chinese: 溫泉; pinyin: Wēnquán; lit. 'hot springs') is a town of Kai County in the northeast of Chongqing Municipality, People's Republic of China, located more than 270 km (170 mi) northeast of central Chongqing. As of 2011, it has three residential communities (社区) and 11 villages under its administration.

== See also ==
- List of township-level divisions of Chongqing
