= High Level Bridge =

High Level Bridge may refer to:

- Detroit–Superior High Level Bridge, road and former tramway bridge over the Cuyahoga River in Cleveland, Ohio.
- High Level Bridge, River Tyne, road and railway bridge between Newcastle upon Tyne and Gateshead, in North East England
- High Level Bridge (Edmonton), over the North Saskatchewan River in Edmonton, Alberta, Canada
- Lethbridge Viaduct, commonly known as the High Level Bridge, over the Oldman River in Lethbridge, Alberta, Canada
- Robert H. Mollohan-Jefferson Street Bridge, locally known as the High Level Bridge, over the Monongahela River, in Fairmont, West Virginia
- Homestead Grays Bridge, formerly known as the Homestead High Level Bridge, over the Monongahela River, between the cities of Pittsburgh and Homestead, in Pennsylvania
- Anthony Wayne Bridge, commonly known as the High Level Bridge, over the Maumee River, in Toledo, Ohio
- The High Level Bridge (film), 2010

== See also ==
- High level (disambiguation)
- Highbridge (disambiguation)
