= Westcott Lodge =

House in Hammersmith, London, England

Coordinates: 51.490222°N 0.232027°W

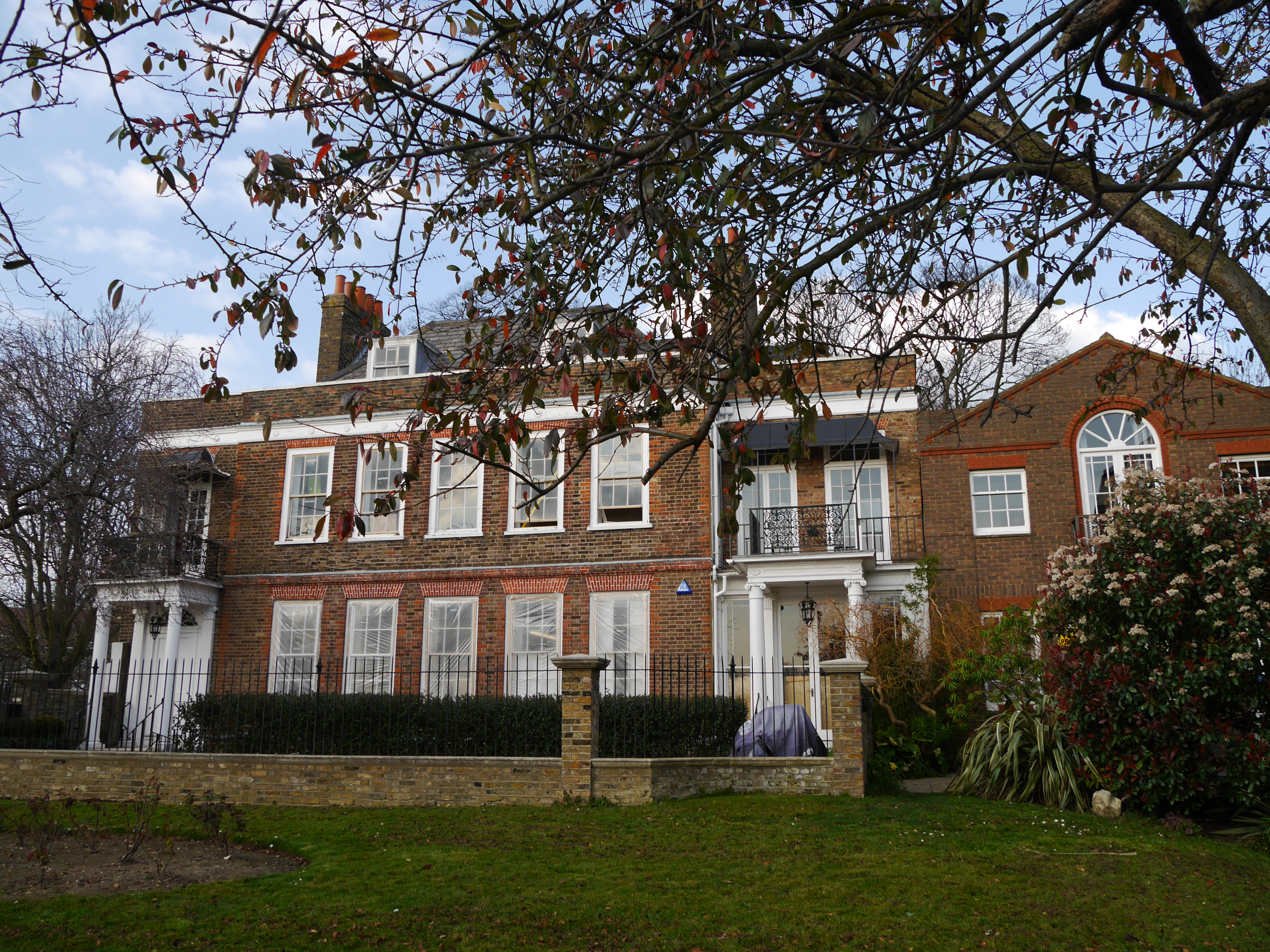
Westcott Lodge

Westcott Lodge is a Grade II listed house in Lower Mall, Hammersmith, London.

It was originally St Paul's Vicarage, and built in 1746, with some later remodelling, and restoration after damage during World War II.

In 1962, it was the first home of the Hammersmith Chess Club, which met there until 1970, when it had grown too large, and moved to St Paul's Church Hall. The first president was the eccentric Lady Herbert, wife of A. P. Herbert from 1966. 1968 saw the British champion, Dr. Jonathan Penrose, play a simultaneous display at the club, winning 17 games and drawing two.

In 1963, a street lamp that had formerly been in West Berlin was given by Willy Brandt, then Mayor of West Berlin, to mark Hammersmith's twinning with the Berlin (previously West Berlin) district of Neukölln. The lamp now stands on the house's wall, facing nearby Furnival Gardens. Below it is a plaque which reads: "The lamp above this plaque was formerly used to light a street in West Berlin. It was presented by Herr Willi Brandt, Mayor of West Berlin to Councillor Stanley Atkins, L. P., The Worshipful the Mayor of Hammersmith, as a token of friendship between the two communities on the occasion of the Jumelage held in this Borough, 1st June 1963."
