= Kaizhou, Chongqing =

Kaizhou 开州区
- District
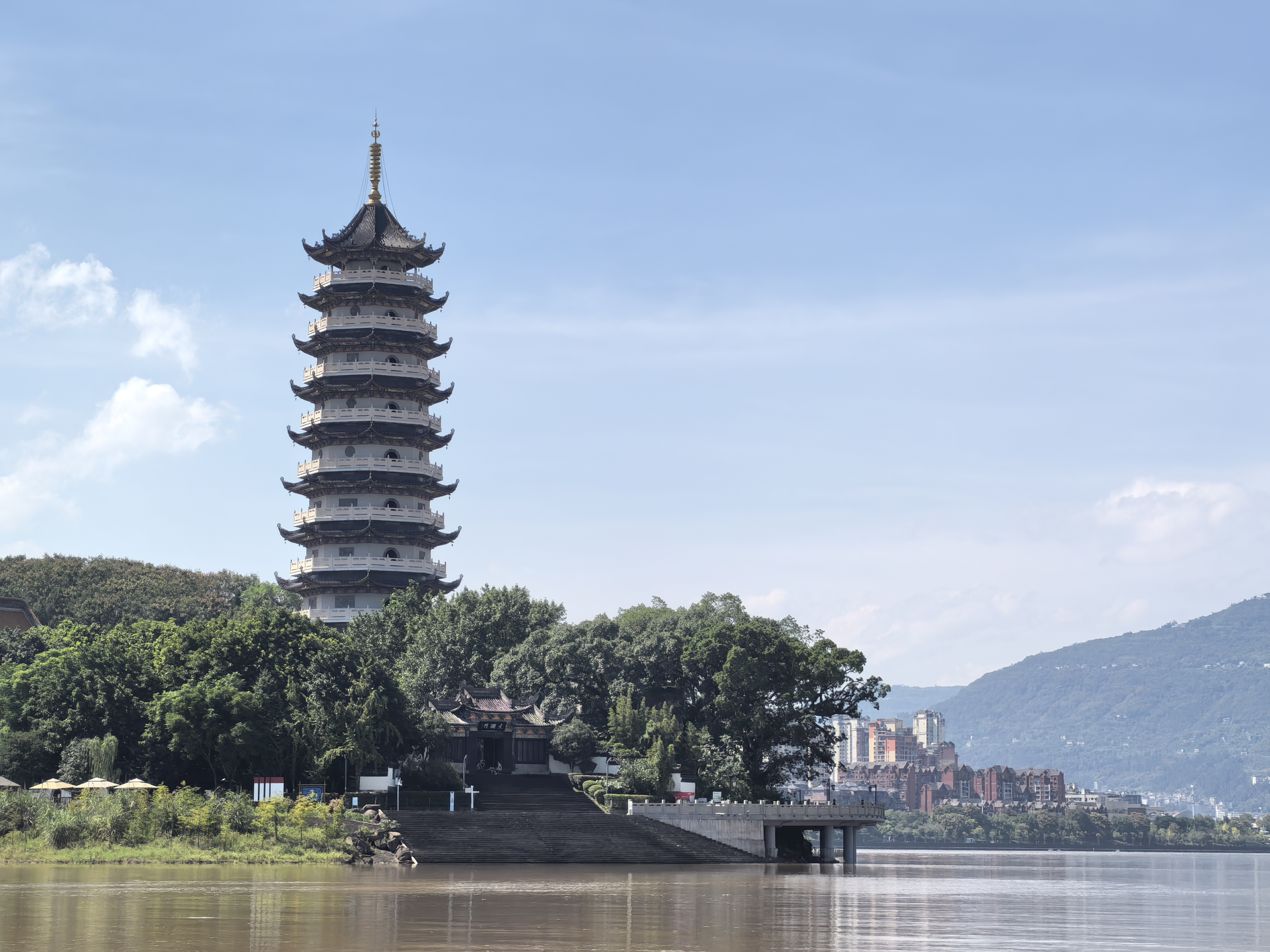

- Location of Kaizhou in Chongqing
- Interactive map of Kaizhou
- Coordinates: 31.2111°N 108.407°E
- Country: People's Republic of China
- Municipality: Chongqing

Area
  - Total: 3,959 km^{2} (1,529 sq mi)

Population (2010)
  - Total: 1,160,336
  - Density: 293.1/km^{2} (759.1/sq mi)
- Time zone: UTC+8 (China Standard)
- Website: www.cqkz.gov.cn

Kaizhou District
- Simplified Chinese: 开州区
- Traditional Chinese: 開州區
- Postal: Kaihsien
Transcriptions
Standard Mandarin
- Hanyu Pinyin: Kāizhōu Qū

Kai County
- Simplified Chinese: 开县
- Traditional Chinese: 開縣
Transcriptions
Standard Mandarin
- Hanyu Pinyin: Kāi Xiàn

Kaizhou District (Chinese: 开州区), formerly known as Kai County, Kaixian or Kaihsien (Chinese: 开县) is a district under the jurisdiction of Chongqing Municipality, in southwestern China, bordering Sichuan province to the west. It has an area of 3,959 square km. As of the end of 2009, it had a population of 1.62 million. It is located 330 kilometers from the urban centre of Chongqing proper.

== History ==
The county has a history dating back some 1,800 years.

In 1373, during the Ming Dynasty, it adopted the name Kaizhou.

In the summer of 1907, there were disturbances in Kai County. Around that time, government schools, Roman Catholic premises and China Inland Mission property as well as the homes of many Chinese Christians in Kai County were successively looted and destroyed.

Li Ching-Yuen, known for his supposed extreme longevity, died in Kai County in 1933.

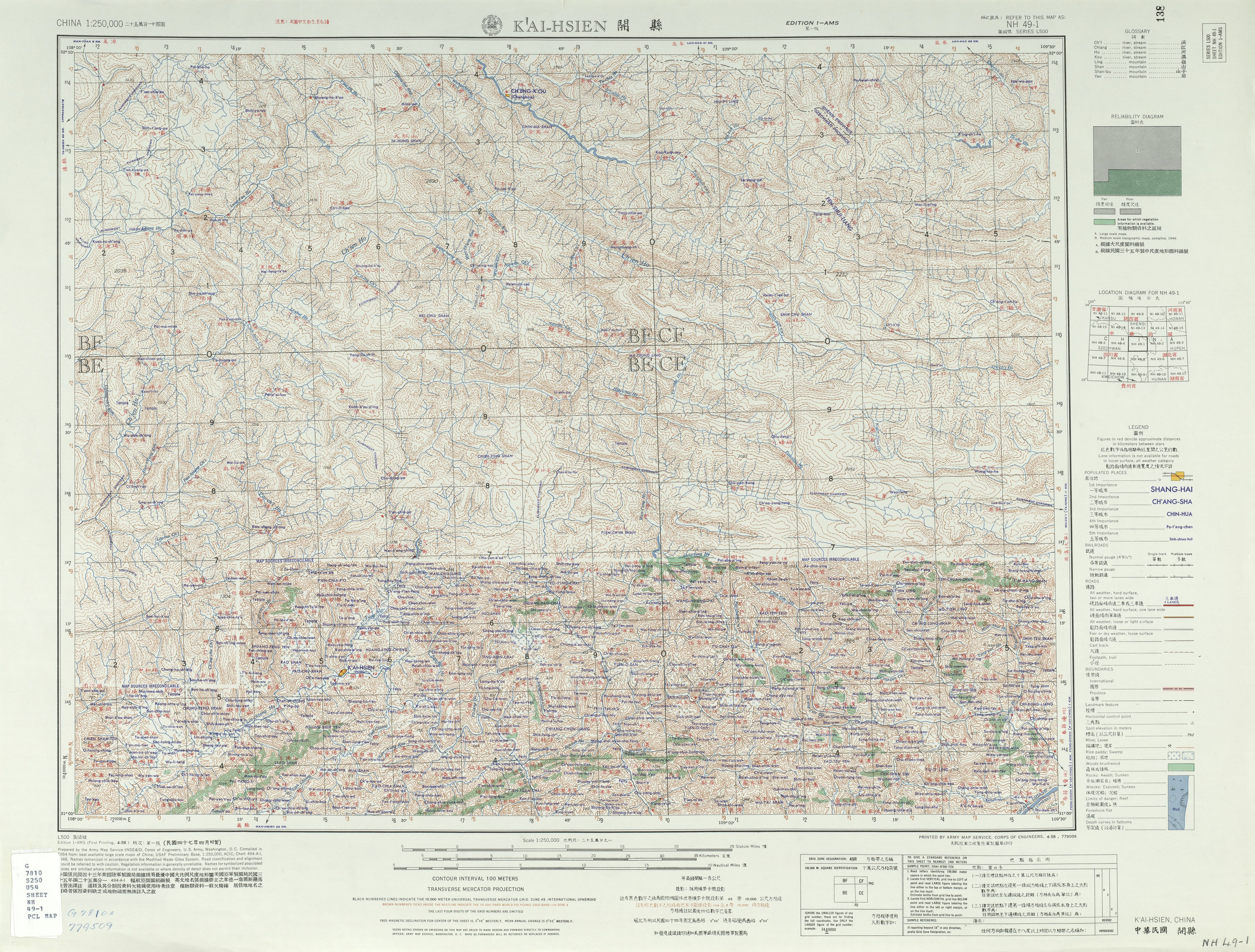
Map of present-day Kaizhou (labeled as K'AI-HSIEN (walled) 開縣) and nearby areas (1954)

Unusual rain patterns and flooding in the Summer of 1982 led to land subsidence. It was reported in the September 6, 1982 edition of the Sichuan Daily that, "In the fourth Tuoxiang brigade, Hujia commune, Yuexi District, Kai County, more than 20 hectares (49 acres) of land subsided; and 310 houses owned by a commune unit, a supply and marketing cooperative, 10 units and 16 commune households all subsided."

Until 2004 the county was one of the poorest in the municipality, home to some 10% of Chongqing municipality residents that lived in poverty. The government has attempted to remedy this in recent years.

In the March 27, 2015 edition of Beijing Today, Kai County was noted as "the nation's largest exporter of migrant labor. There were 535,000 from that county in 2014, and 15 percent were older than 50. In Fengcun Village, half the villagers are migrant workers."

Kaizhou has been developing rapidly in recent years as the government works to maintain Hanfeng lake and encourage more people to invest in Kaizhou.

== Administrative divisions ==
As of 2018, Kaizhou District administered seven subdistricts, twenty-six towns and seven townships.

Name	Chinese (S)	Hanyu Pinyin	Population (2010)	Area (km^{2})
Zhendong Subdistrict	镇东街道	Zhèndōng Jiēdào	18,819	26.5
Fengle Subdistrict	丰乐街道	Fēnglè Jiēdào	19,851	25
Baihe Subdistrict	白鹤街道	Báihè Jiēdào	40,937	79.2
Hanfeng Subdistrict	汉丰街道	Hànfēng Jiēdào	85,107	52
Wenfeng Subdistrict	文峰街道	Wénfēng Jiēdào	69,747	23.9
Yunfeng Subdistrict	云枫街道	Yúnfēng Jiēdào	41,674	23.74
Zhaojia Subdistrict	赵家街道	Zhàojiā Jiēdào	39,910	152
Guojia town	郭家镇	Guōjiā Zhèn	31,394	79
Wenquan town	温泉镇	Wēnquán Zhèn	39,402	149
Tieqiao town	铁桥镇	Tiěqiáo Zhèn	42,085	115
Nanya town	南雅镇	Nányǎ Zhèn	28,382	70
Heqian town	和谦镇	Héqiān Zhèn	20,632	80
Zhen'an town	镇安镇	Zhèn'ān Zhèn	15,452	56.67
Zhuxi town	竹溪镇	Zhúxī Zhèn	22,900	84
Qukou town	渠口镇	Qúkǒu Zhèn	14,437	68
Houba town	厚坝镇	Hòubà Zhèn	17,358	49
Gaoqiao town	高桥镇	Gāoqiáo Zhèn	23,608	78
Yihe town	义和镇	Yìhé Zhèn	26,313	61
Dajin town	大进镇	Dàjìn Zhèn	32,213	251
Changsha town	长沙镇	Chángshā Zhèn	47,170	136
Linjiang town	临江镇	Línjiāng Zhèn	71,149	123.2
Dunhao town	敦好镇	Dūnhǎo Zhèn	36,863	144
Zhonghe town	中和镇	Zhōnghé Zhèn	43,318	89
Yuexi town	岳溪镇	Yuèxī Zhèn	47,802	186
Nanmen town	南门镇	Nánmén Zhèn	40,941	158
Heyan town	河堰镇	Héyàn Zhèn	19,589	154
Jiulongshan town	九龙山镇	Jiǔlóngshān Zhèn	32,696	135
Baiqiao town	白桥镇	Báiqiáo Zhèn	13,796	84
Tianhe town	天和镇	Tiānhé Zhèn	14,818	67
Jinfeng town	金峰镇	Jīnfēng Zhèn	13,355	57
Tanjia town	谭家镇	Tánjiā Zhèn	15,261	125
Wushan town	巫山镇	Wūshān Zhèn	19,829	117
Dade town	大德镇	Dàdé Zhèn	31,548	118
Baiquan Township	白泉乡	Báiquán Xiāng	8,229	196
Guanmian Township	关面乡	Guānmiàn Xiāng	7,127	146.5
Manyue Township	满月乡	Mǎnyuè Xiāng	10,057	148.7
Wutong Township	五通乡	Wǔtōng Xiāng	10,057	60.67
Maliu Township	麻柳乡	Máliǔ Xiāng	17,451	96
Zishui Township	紫水乡	Zǐshuǐ Xiāng	20,396	94
Sanhuikou Township	三汇口乡	Sānhuìkǒu Xiāng	13,190	77.28

== Climate ==
Climate data for Kaizhou, elevation 217 m (712 ft), (1991–2020 normals, extremes 1981–2010)
Month	Jan	Feb	Mar	Apr	May	Jun	Jul	Aug	Sep	Oct	Nov	Dec	Year
Record high °C (°F)	20.4 (68.7)	27.7 (81.9)	34.2 (93.6)	37.5 (99.5)	39.4 (102.9)	41.2 (106.2)	42.2 (108.0)	43.2 (109.8)	43.1 (109.6)	35.8 (96.4)	28.7 (83.7)	20.5 (68.9)	43.2 (109.8)
Mean daily maximum °C (°F)	10.9 (51.6)	13.9 (57.0)	19.2 (66.6)	24.8 (76.6)	28.3 (82.9)	31.2 (88.2)	34.7 (94.5)	35.1 (95.2)	29.8 (85.6)	23.6 (74.5)	18.2 (64.8)	12.1 (53.8)	23.5 (74.3)
Daily mean °C (°F)	7.4 (45.3)	9.7 (49.5)	14.0 (57.2)	19.2 (66.6)	22.9 (73.2)	26.1 (79.0)	29.1 (84.4)	29.0 (84.2)	24.7 (76.5)	19.1 (66.4)	14.1 (57.4)	8.8 (47.8)	18.7 (65.6)
Mean daily minimum °C (°F)	5.2 (41.4)	7.0 (44.6)	10.6 (51.1)	15.3 (59.5)	19.2 (66.6)	22.5 (72.5)	25.2 (77.4)	24.9 (76.8)	21.4 (70.5)	16.5 (61.7)	11.6 (52.9)	6.7 (44.1)	15.5 (59.9)
Record low °C (°F)	−2.3 (27.9)	−2.1 (28.2)	0.2 (32.4)	7.0 (44.6)	12.1 (53.8)	16.2 (61.2)	16.9 (62.4)	17.9 (64.2)	13.1 (55.6)	4.3 (39.7)	1.0 (33.8)	−3.6 (25.5)	−3.6 (25.5)
Average precipitation mm (inches)	16.6 (0.65)	21.4 (0.84)	54.3 (2.14)	104.1 (4.10)	172.7 (6.80)	194.6 (7.66)	186.7 (7.35)	156.5 (6.16)	174.0 (6.85)	123.1 (4.85)	57.5 (2.26)	18.9 (0.74)	1,280.4 (50.4)
Average precipitation days (≥ 0.1 mm)	8.3	7.4	11.0	13.2	14.4	14.2	13.2	11.5	12.5	13.8	10.5	8.3	138.3
Average snowy days	0.3	0.1	0	0	0	0	0	0	0	0	0	0	0.4
Average relative humidity (%)	81	77	74	75	76	78	74	71	76	83	84	85	78
Mean monthly sunshine hours	38.4	47.8	96.4	132.3	135.4	136.2	195.5	207.4	130.3	89.1	64.9	36.4	1,310.1
Percentage possible sunshine	12	15	26	34	32	32	46	51	36	26	21	12	29
Source: China Meteorological Administration
