= Jinfeng, Kaizhou District =

Jinfeng 金峰镇
- Town
- Location in Chongqing
- Coordinates: 31°11′21″N 108°33′58″E
- Country: People's Republic of China
- Direct-administered municipality: Chongqing
- District: Kaizhou District
- Time zone: UTC+8 (China Standard)

Jinfeng (Chinese: 金峰; pinyin: Jīnfēng) is a town under the administration of Kaizhou District, Chongqing, China. As of 2018, it has one residential community and 6 villages under its administration.

== See also ==
- List of township-level divisions of Chongqing
