= High level =

High Level may refer to:

- High- and low-level, classification levels in the description of systems
- High Level, a town in northern Alberta, Canada
- Hi-Level, a type of passenger railcar

== See also ==
- High Level Architecture, a military computer simulation framework
- High-level assembler, a type of assembly language translator
- High-level design, an initial stage in software design
- High-level document, a standard in software inspection
- High-level programming language, a type of computer programming language
- High-level waste, a type of nuclear waste
- High Level Bridge (disambiguation)
