= Hammersmith Creek =

Filled up river in the London Borough of Hammersmith & Fulham

- Hammersmith Creek (London Borough of Hammersmith and Fulham)

Location
- Country: England
- County: Middlesex
- City: London
- Area: Hammersmith

Physical characteristics
- Source: King Street, Hammersmith
- Mouth: Furnivall Gardens, Hammersmith
  - location: Furnivall Gardens, Hammersmith
  - coordinates: 51.490388°N 0.233877°W

Hammersmith Creek was an outflow river of the Stamford Brook, and used to run through what is now King Street, into the River Thames at the present-day site of Furnivall Gardens in Hammersmith.

In 1936, after the decline of the creek harbour, the creek was filled in and the water channelled through an underground culvert.

== History ==
Origins

Hammersmith Creek was once the mouth of Stamford Brook, running from King Street into the River Thames, separating the Lower Mall and Upper Mall.

In 1677, the Hammersmith Quaker Meeting House was built on the eastern bank of the creek on 28 Lower Mall. The house was later rebuilt in 1765.

High Bridge

In 1751, a wooden foot-bridge spanning the creek named the High Bridge (also known as the Bishop's Bridge) was built by Bishop Thomas Sherlock. The bridge was rebuilt several times, by Bishop William Howley in 1820 and Bishop Charles Blomfield in 1837. By 1915, The bridge converged four old footpaths or bridle paths (Lower Mall and Aspen Place on the east and Upper Mall and Bridge Street on the west).

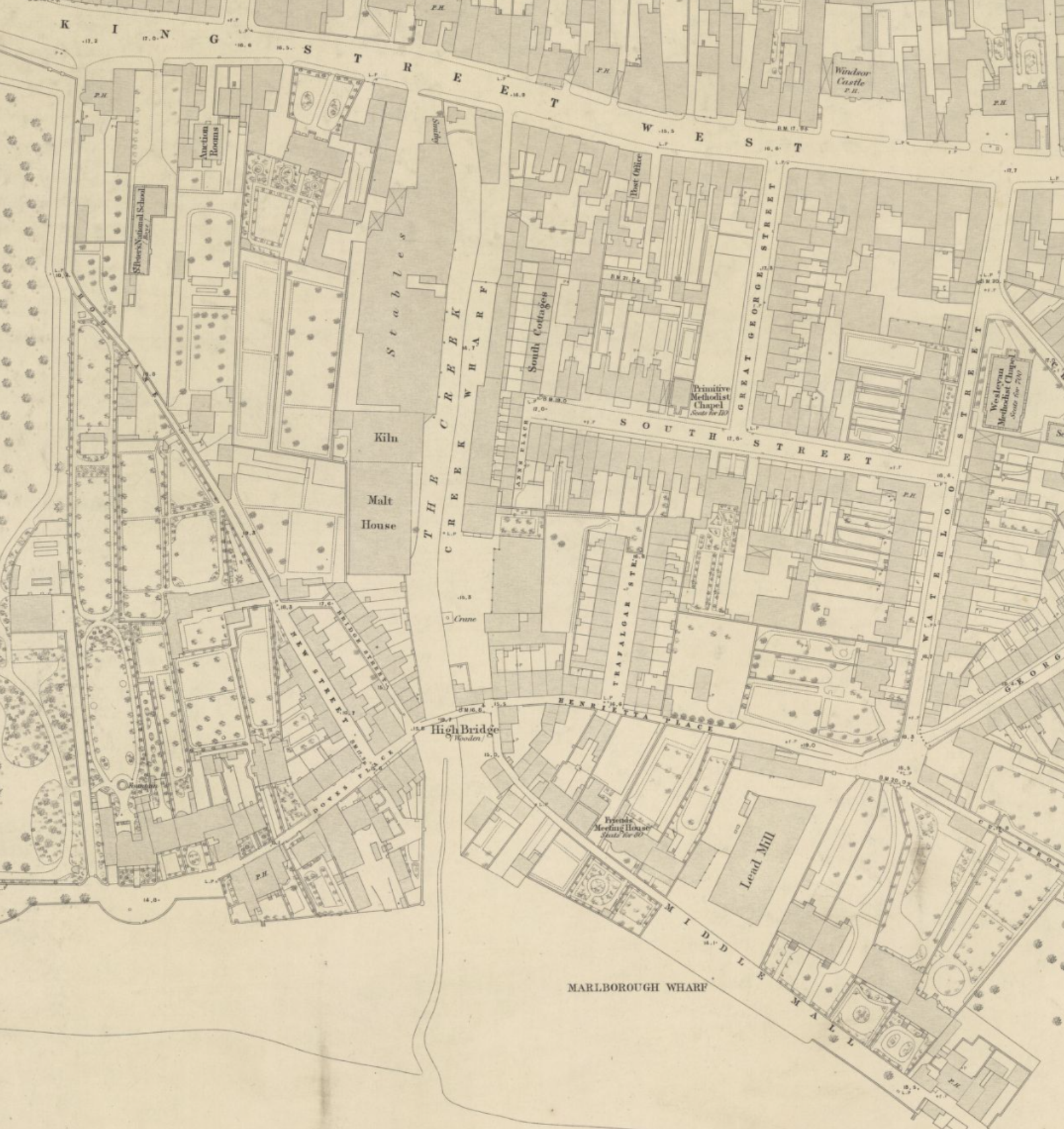
Hammersmith Creek Ordnance Survey 1866

Riverside development

Until the early 19th century the creek was navigable for nearly a mile northward and was used for cargo transportation and a growing fishing industry, but successive embankment of the river contracted this length. The western bank was occupied by kilns, stables and malt houses which formed part of the Hammersmith Brewery (also known as Cromwell’s Brewery) founded by Joseph Cromwell in 1780. The eastern bank was occupied by wharves, warehouses and the Phoenix Lead Mills.

The creek was the scene of much industry in an area or slum known as Little Wapping, after Wapping, Tower Hamlets. Writing in 1839, English topographer Thomas Faulkner described the area:

"Nearly in the centre of this Mall are several fishermen's huts, called Little Wapping, which detracts much from the respectability of this part of the village"

Writing in 1876, English antiquary James Thorne described the creek:

"a dirty little inlet of the Thames, which is crossed by a wooden footbridge, built originally by Bishop Sherlock in 1751 … the region of squalid tenements bordering the Creek having acquired the cognomen of Little Wapping, probably from its confined and dirty character."

Writing in 1881, English textile designer and poet William Morris described Little Wapping:

“"As I sit at my work at home, which is at Hammersmith, close to the river, I often hear go past the window some of that ruffianism of which a good deal has been said in the papers of late. As I hear the yells and shrieks, and all the degradation cast on the glorious tongue of Shakespeare and Milton, as I see the brutal, reckless faces and figures go past me, it rouses the recklessness and brutality in me also, and fierce wrath takes possession of me, till I remember, as I hope I mostly do, that it was my good luck only of being born respectable and rich that has put me on this side of the window among delightful books and lovely works of art, and not on the other side and the empty street, the drink-steeped liquor-shops, the foul and degraded lodgings.”

=== Culverting ===
In the early 20th century, the area suffered after the decline of the fishing industry in the creek harbour. The 1913 annual report of the Hampshire House Trust described the area:

"‘One of London’s poorer and apparently more hopeless districts is situated in the alleys, unpenetrated by any road, which lie between King Street and the river…and Hog Lane and Waterloo Street…The inhabitants are costers, flowersellers, casual labourers, chronic invalids; mothers habitually tired; and children, children, children…The housing accommodation is what you might expect. In one street there is one water-closet to four houses…in another the costers’ donkeys are led through the houses entering at the front door, and going along the passages, to the hovels in the yards at the back."

As part of the Housing, Town Planning, &c. Act 1919, the Hammersmith Borough Council aimed to clear the area for new housing through the Southern Improvement Scheme, conceived in 1919. In 1927, the council bought the area around the creek for £8,000. In 1936, the creek was filled in and the water channelled through an underground culvert, partly beneath the present location of Hammersmith Town Hall.

When Hammersmith Town Hall was built in 1938–9, architect Ernest Berry Webber incorporated two colossal heads of Father Thames in commemoration that the building stands astride the old creek.

On 5 May 1951, Furnivall Gardens and the nearby Hammersmith Pier opened on the site. Today, only a small drainage tunnel, visible from the Dove Pier, remains as evidence of the creek. The High Bridge is still marked by a raised hump in the gardens and a flowerbed.

== Course ==
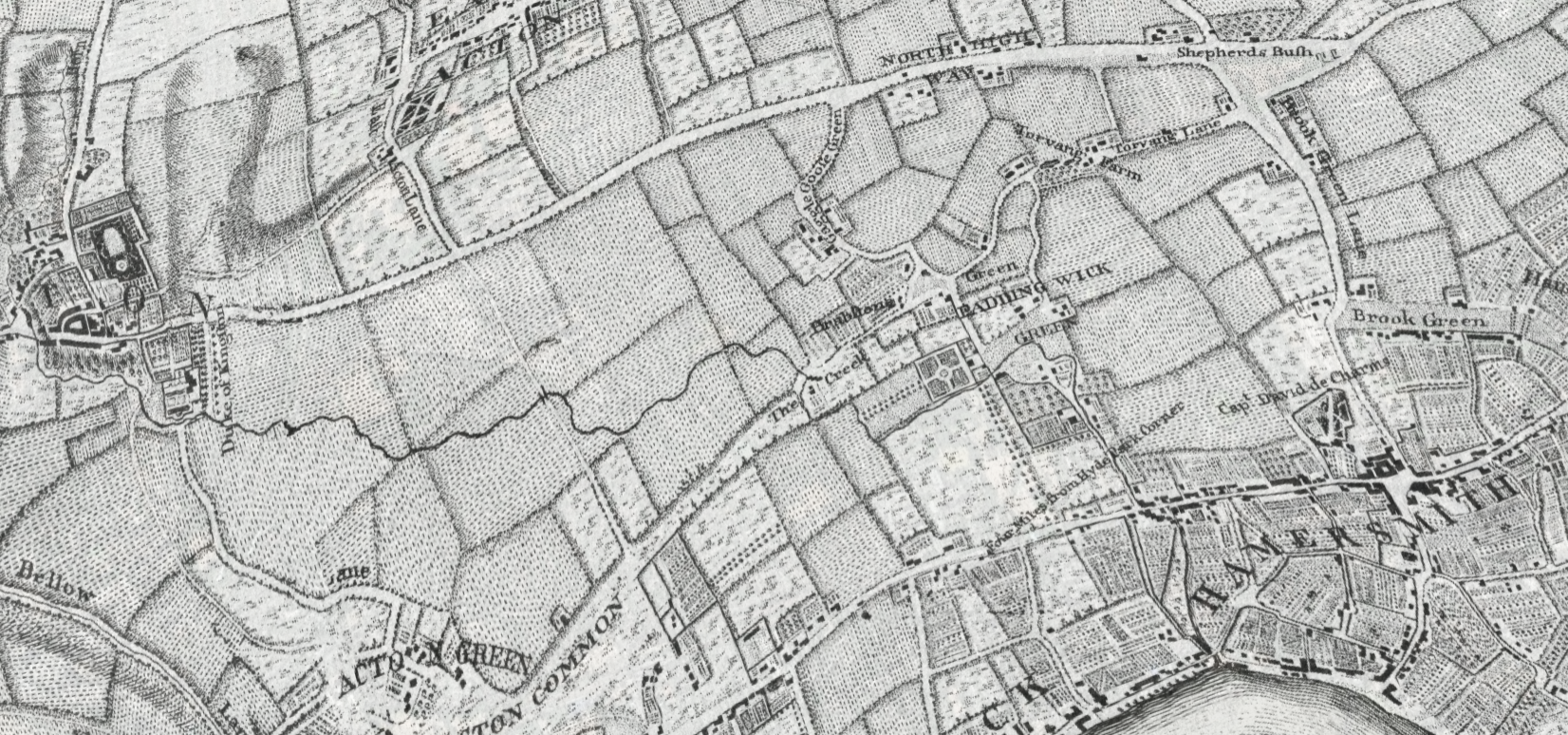
Hammersmith Creek documented by John Rocque in 1746

John Rocque's maps of London, produced in 1746, shows the creek running south from what is now North Acton Playing Fields towards Gunnersbury House, directly east past Berrymead Priory, belonging to the Duke of Kingston, towards Ravenscourt House in Ravenscourt Park and then south through King Street to meet the River Thames at what is now Furnivall Gardens.

== Toponymy ==
In 1839, Thomas Faulkner proposed that Hammersmith Creek gave name to the parish of Hammersmith, originating from two Saxon words: the creek constituting the ancient Hyth, or harbour, with the additional cognomen of Ham or Hame. However, others have suggested Hammersmith may mean "(Place with) a hammer smithy or forge".

== See also ==
- Subterranean rivers of London
- Rivers of the United Kingdom
