= Gaoqiao, Kai County =

Town in Chongqing, China

Gaoqiao 高桥镇
- Town
- Location in Chongqing
- Coordinates: 31°22′01″N 108°14′42″E
- Country: People's Republic of China
- Direct-administered municipality: Chongqing
- District: Kai County

Gaoqiao (simplified Chinese: 高桥镇; traditional Chinese: 高橋鎮; pinyin: Gāoqiáo Zhèn) is a town located in a valley in Kai County, in the northeast of Chongqing municipality in Southwest China. Central Chongqing lies 340 kilometres (210 mi) to the southwest.

== History ==
On 23 December 2003 at 21:15, a gas well burst and released highly toxic hydrogen sulfide. According to China Daily, 243 people died and at least 9,000 were injured.

The well was called “罗家16H” and belonged to PetroChina's Southwest Oil and Gas Field Branch (西南油气田分公司). It was located in the Chuandongbei gas field (Chinese: 川东北气矿; pinyin: Chuāndōngběi qìkuàng) in Gaoqiao's Xiaoyang village (Chinese: 小阳村; pinyin: Xiǎoyáng Cūn).

In 2007, Chevron Corporation and China National Petroleum Corporation signed a contract to share production in Chuandongbei, with Chevron getting 49 percent of the venture, operating the project and supplying the technology.

== See also ==
- List of township-level divisions of Chongqing
