= Gaoliang Bridge =

Gaoliang Bridge or Gaoliangqiao (Chinese: 高梁桥; pinyin: Gāoliáng Qiáo) is a bridge situated in Haidian District, Beijing. It was first built in 1292 during the Yuan dynasty.

== History ==
Kublai Khan built the bridge to meet the water needs of Beijing. He commissioned Guo Shoujing to dredge the water ways and construct a bridge. During the Ming and Qing dynasties, it formed part of the route between Beijing and the Western Hills. According to legend, the Gaoliang River comes from the story about Zhe Gao. There was a river in the north side of the Xizhimen. It was said that both the Yuan emperor and Liu Bowen wanted to make the newly formed city of Dadu (now part of Beijing) the capital of China. However, Beijing was a sea of river at that time so, Liu threatened the Dragon King to move the water to another place. Days later, the Dragon King flew away with his wife. Liu ordered Gao Liang to arrest the King. Gao caught up with the Dragon King, but Gao drowned in the river during the ensuing battle. In commemoration of the hero, the people named the bridge after him.

== Transport ==
- Xizhimen station
- Beijing North railway station
