= Highertown =

Hamlet in Cornwall, England

Coordinates: 50.600°N 4.658°W

- Location within Cornwall
- OS grid reference: SX120812
- Civil parish: Advent
- Unitary authority: Cornwall
- Ceremonial county: Cornwall
- Region: South West
- Country: England
- Sovereign state: United Kingdom

Highertown is a hamlet in Cornwall, England. It is on the western edge of Bodmin Moor in the parish of Advent.
