= 高梁 =

高梁, meaning 'high bridge', may refer to:

- Gaoliang Bridge, a bridge in Beijing, China
- Takahashi, Okayama, Japan
