= Higher Town, Cornwall =

Hamlet in mid Cornwall, England

Coordinates: 50.4160°N 4.8149°W

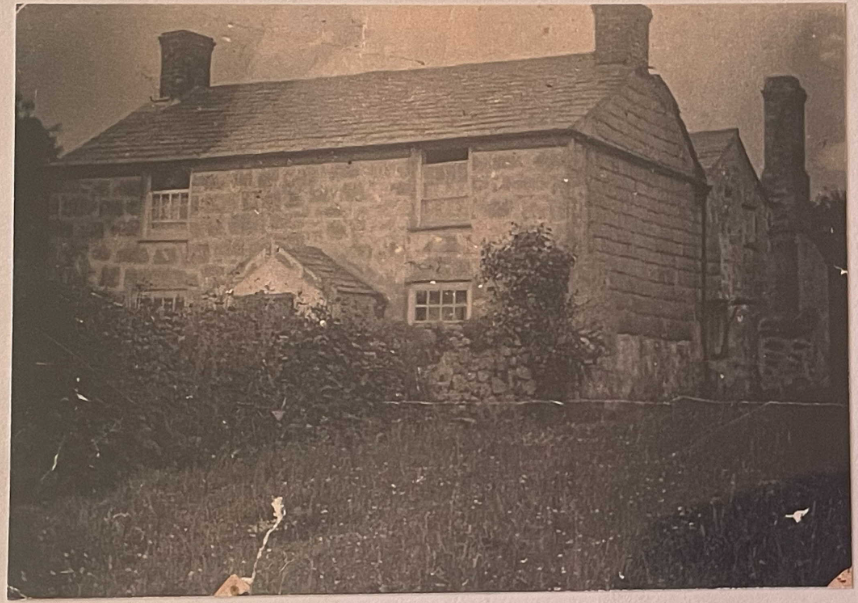
The old Higher Town Farm house (demolished), photo taken in the late 1800s to early 1900s, during this time the Hosking family occupied the property.

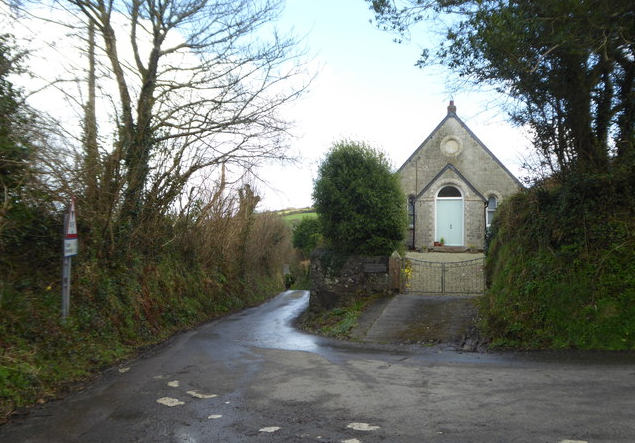
Former Bible Christian Church chapel in Higher Town, located south of Tremodrett Manor House, 2017.

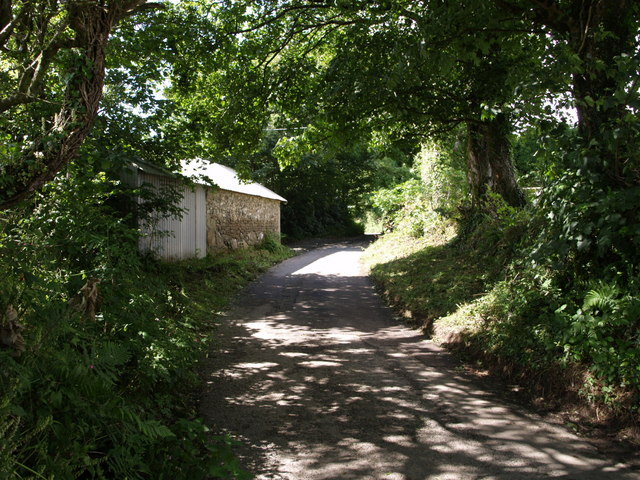
The lane at Higher Town Farm, 2007.

Higher Town is a hamlet in Roche parish, mid Cornwall, England, lying about 1 1/2 miles (2.4 km) northeast of Roche village at grid reference SX003614.

== History ==
The name Higher Town is believed to have originated from Higher Town Farm, which eventually lent its name to the surrounding hamlet.

In the early 19th century, the majority of land and property in Higher Town was owned by Richard Edgcumbe, 2nd Earl of Mount Edgcumbe. Most local residents were tenants under his ownership. The hamlet spans an approximate radius of 630 meters, with Higher Town Farm situated at its center.

According to the local Tithe map dated 16 April 1838, the following individuals were recorded as residents or landholders within the present-day boundaries of Higher Town:

- Nicholas Pascoe of Higher Town Farm
- William Rowse of Bawdens Farm (present-day name) and Tremodrett Farm House
- John Retallick of Tremoddrett (now Tremodrett) Manor House and associated farmlands
- Richard Retallick of New House farm
- William Hodge of Burnet (now Burney) House farm
- James Stick of Chilbrook (now Chillbrook) Farm
- Nicholas Stick of New Town Cottages and associated farmlands
- Thomas Stick of Mary Pickes Cottage
- Joseph Lawry of Trenower Farm and East Griglands associated farmlands
- Nicholas Hoskins of Upper and Lower Bee Park (farmlands)
- John Hoskins of Outer and Homer Well Park (farmlands)
- James Hoskins of Part of Outer Hill (farmlands)

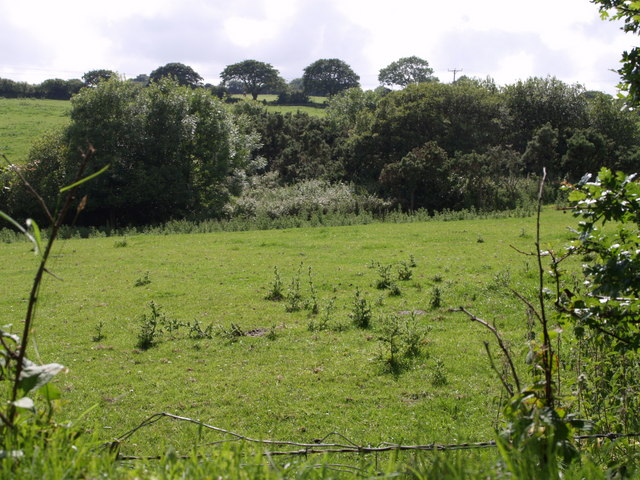
Field and pond at Higher Town, 2007.
