= High Forge =

Hamlet in County Durham, England

Coordinates: 54°52′56″N 1°38′52″W

High Forge is a hamlet in County Durham, England. It is situated a short distance to the west of Urpeth, north of Beamish.
