= Higher Bal =

Hamlet in Cornwall, England

Coordinates: 50.313°N 5.216°W

- Location within Cornwall
- OS grid reference: SW711508
- Civil parish: St Agnes
- Unitary authority: Cornwall
- Ceremonial county: Cornwall
- Region: South West
- Country: England
- Sovereign state: United Kingdom
- Post town: St Agnes
- Postcode district: TR5

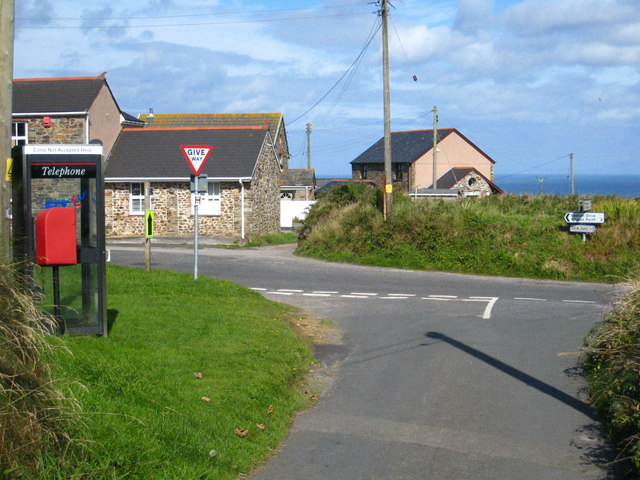
Road junction at Higher Bal Part of the circular route around St Agnes Beacon.

Higher Bal is a hamlet in the parish of St Agnes, Cornwall, England.
