= Hampshire Hog =

Pub in London, England

Coordinates: 51.492526°N 0.2333061°W

The Hampshire
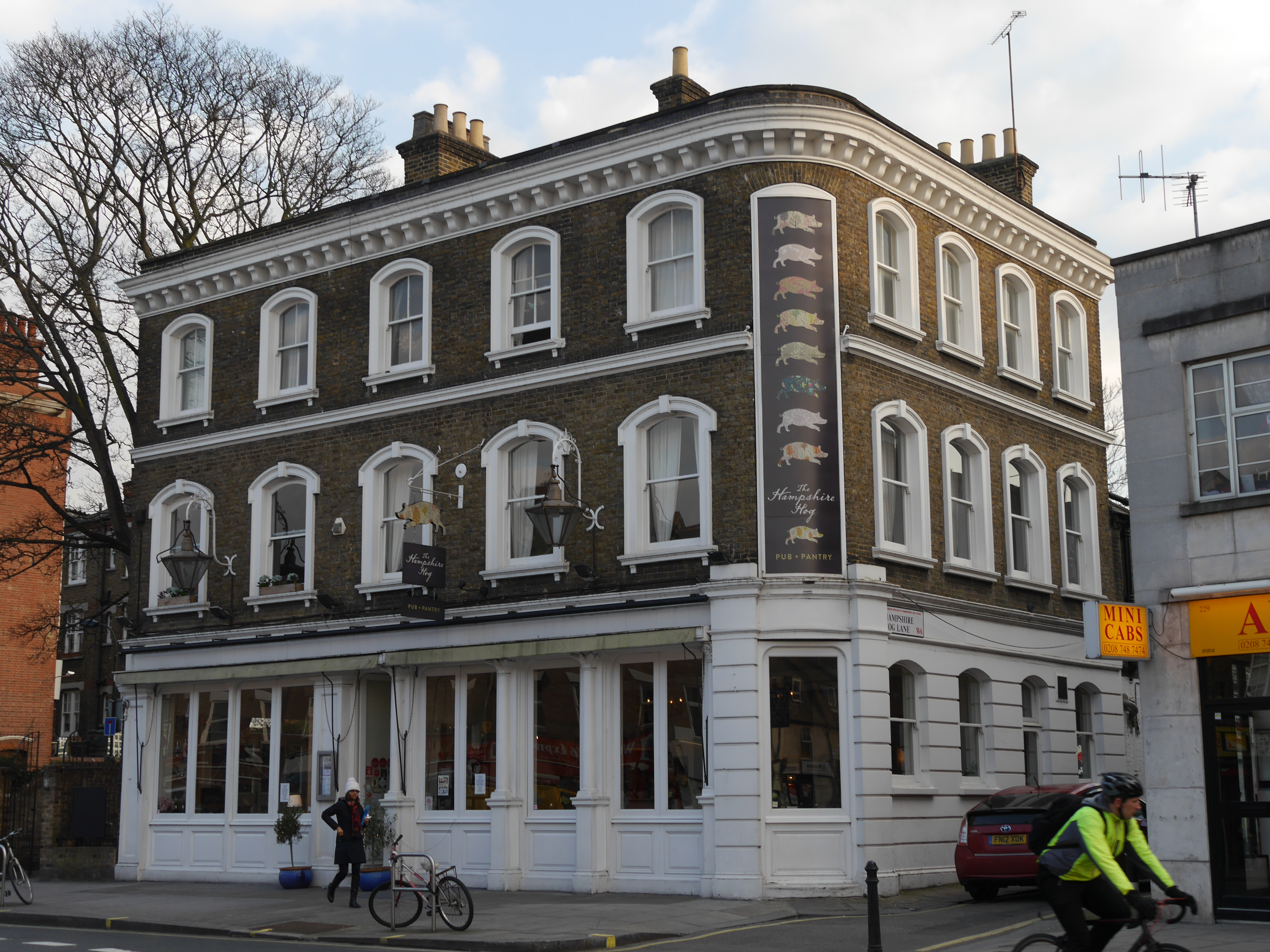
- The Hampshire, King Street, Hammersmith, 2016
- Interactive map of The Hampshire

Restaurant information
- Owners: Srinivas & Agali Murthy
- Previous owner: Sich's Chiswick Brewery
- Head chef: Barneet Singh
- Food type: Indian
- Location: 227 King Street, Hammersmith, London, United Kingdom

The Hampshire is a pub at 227 King Street, Hammersmith, London.

The Hampshire, formerly The Hampshire Hog was first licensed in the 17th century as The Hogs, a name based on that of the members of the Royal Hampshire Regiment. The current building was owned by Sich's Chiswick Brewery, and they rebuilt it in 1883. The road running along the west side is Hampshire Hog Lane, and 17th century Hampshire House and Hampshire Cottage, both since demolished, were close by.

Before the take over of The Hampshire Hog in 2012, the owners had previously run The Engineer in Gloucester Avenue, Primrose Hill, one of the first gastropubs in London. They continued this legacy through The Hampshire Hog and ran it as a gastropub. In July 2020, the pub was rebranded as an Indian Restaurant under the updated name 'The Hampshire'.
