= Furnival Gardens =

Park in Hammersmith, London, England

Coordinates: 51°29′26″N 0°13′58″W

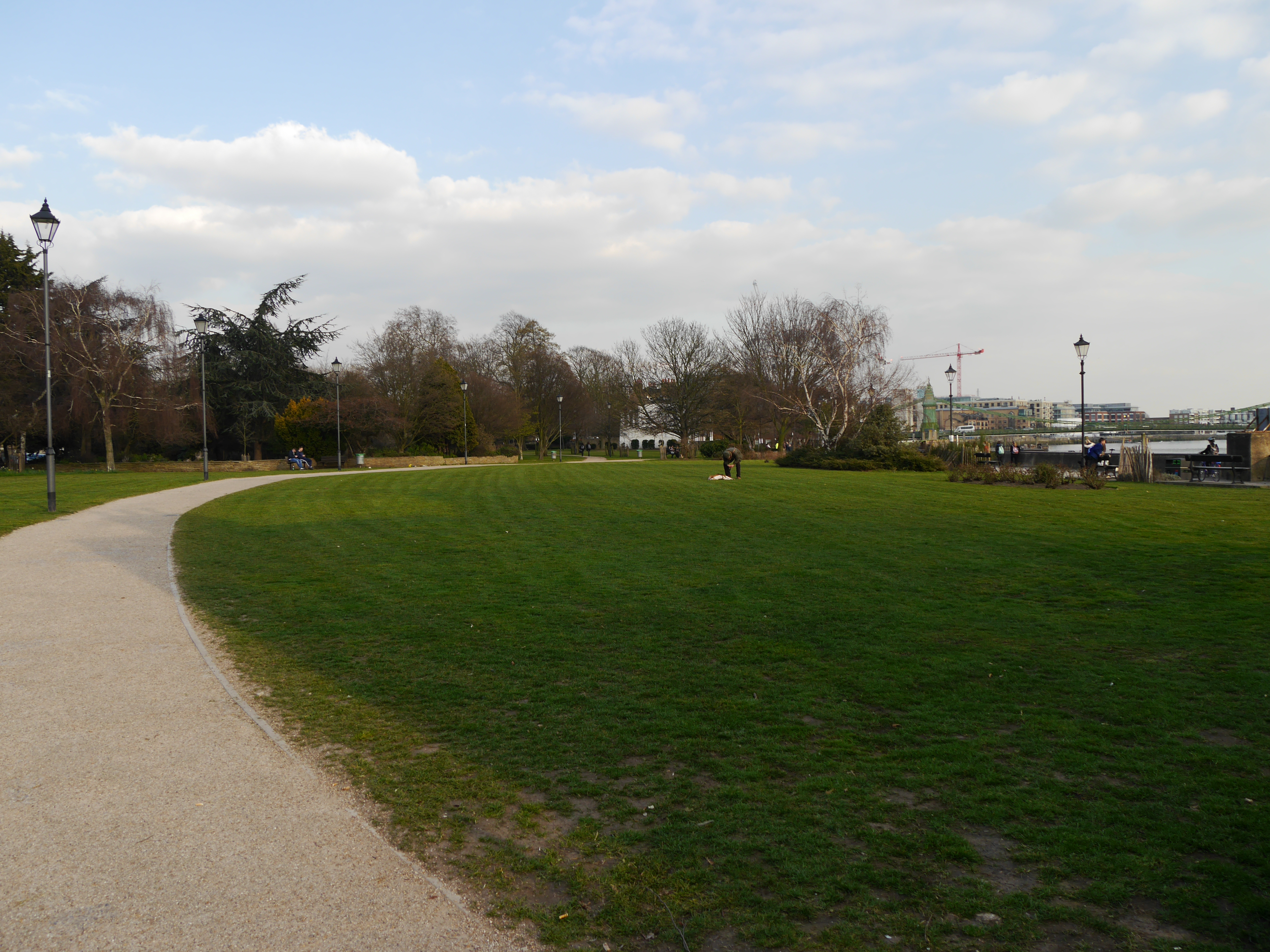
Furnivall Gardens

Furnivall Gardens (also spelt Furnival Gardens) is a park in Hammersmith alongside the river Thames.

It was once the location of the mouth of Hammersmith Creek, which had an active fishing trade until about 200 years ago. The creek was filled in during 1936.

In 1948, it was decided that there should be a public open space on bomb-damaged land between the river and the Great West Road, to coincide with the 1951 Festival of Britain. The new riverside park was named after the scholar Dr Frederick James Furnivall, who founded what is now the Furnivall Sculling Club in 1896. A garden area was created on what had been the Hammersmith Friends Meeting House burial ground, destroyed by a flying bomb in the war.

In 1963, a street lamp that had formerly been in West Berlin was given by Willy Brandt, then Mayor of West Berlin, to mark Hammersmith's twinning with the Berlin (previously West Berlin) district of Neukölln. It now stands on the wall of Westcott Lodge, facing the gardens. Below it is a plaque which reads: "The lamp above this plaque was formerly used to light a street in West Berlin. It was presented by Herr Willi Brandt, Mayor of West Berlin to Councillor Stanley Atkins, L. P., The Worshipful the Mayor of Hammersmith, as a token of friendship between the two communities on the occasion of the Jumelage held in this Borough, 1st June 1963."
