= Takahashi method =

Brief, bold, textual presentation style

A poster with the Korean text translated as, "Using the Takahashi Method is easy to grab the audience's attention"

The Takahashi method (Japanese: 高橋メソッド) is a technique deploying extremely simple and distilled visual slides for presentations. It is similar to the Lessig method, created by Harvard professor and former presidential candidate Lawrence Lessig.

It is named for its inventor, Masayoshi Takahashi (高橋征義). Takahashi built the method around using only text slides, no charts or images. Unlike a typical presentation, no pictures and no charts are used. Only a few words are printed on each slide—often only one or two short words, using very large characters. To make up for this, a presenter will use many more slides than in a traditional presentation, each slide being shown for a much shorter duration.

== History ==
Takahashi, a programmer, developed the method after preparing a short presentation for RubyConf. He avoided presentation software such as PowerPoint, using text-only slides instead, and focused on selecting a single word or short phrase per slide to guide the audience. These phrases resemble Japanese newspaper headlines rather than full sentences and are arranged visually to allow rapid comprehension. The approach is considered particularly effective for Japanese and other non-Latin writing systems, and has since been widely adopted at developer conferences, including in the presentations of Audrey Tang at Perl and open-source events.
