= 高橋 =

高橋 or 高桥, meaning 'high bridge', may refer to:

- Gaoqiao (disambiguation), Chinese transliteration
- Takahashi (disambiguation), Japanese transliteration
