= Higher Tremarcoombe =

Hamlet in Cornwall, England

Coordinates: 50°29′55″N 4°28′05″W

Higher Tremarcoombe is a hamlet in the parish of St Cleer, Cornwall, England.
