= Higher Tolcarne =

Hamlet in Cornwall, England

Coordinates: 50.450°N 4.982°W

- Location within Cornwall
- OS grid reference: SW884654
- Unitary authority: Cornwall
- Ceremonial county: Cornwall
- Region: South West
- Country: England
- Sovereign state: United Kingdom
- Post town: St Columb
- Postcode district: TR9

Higher Tolcarne is a hamlet in Cornwall, England]. It is near St Mawgan; Tolcarne was one of the two Cornish manors of this name recorded in the Domesday Book, 1086. It is in the civil parish of Mawgan in Pydar
