= Stamford Brook =

Subterranean river in London, England

Coordinates: 51.4904°N 0.2341°W

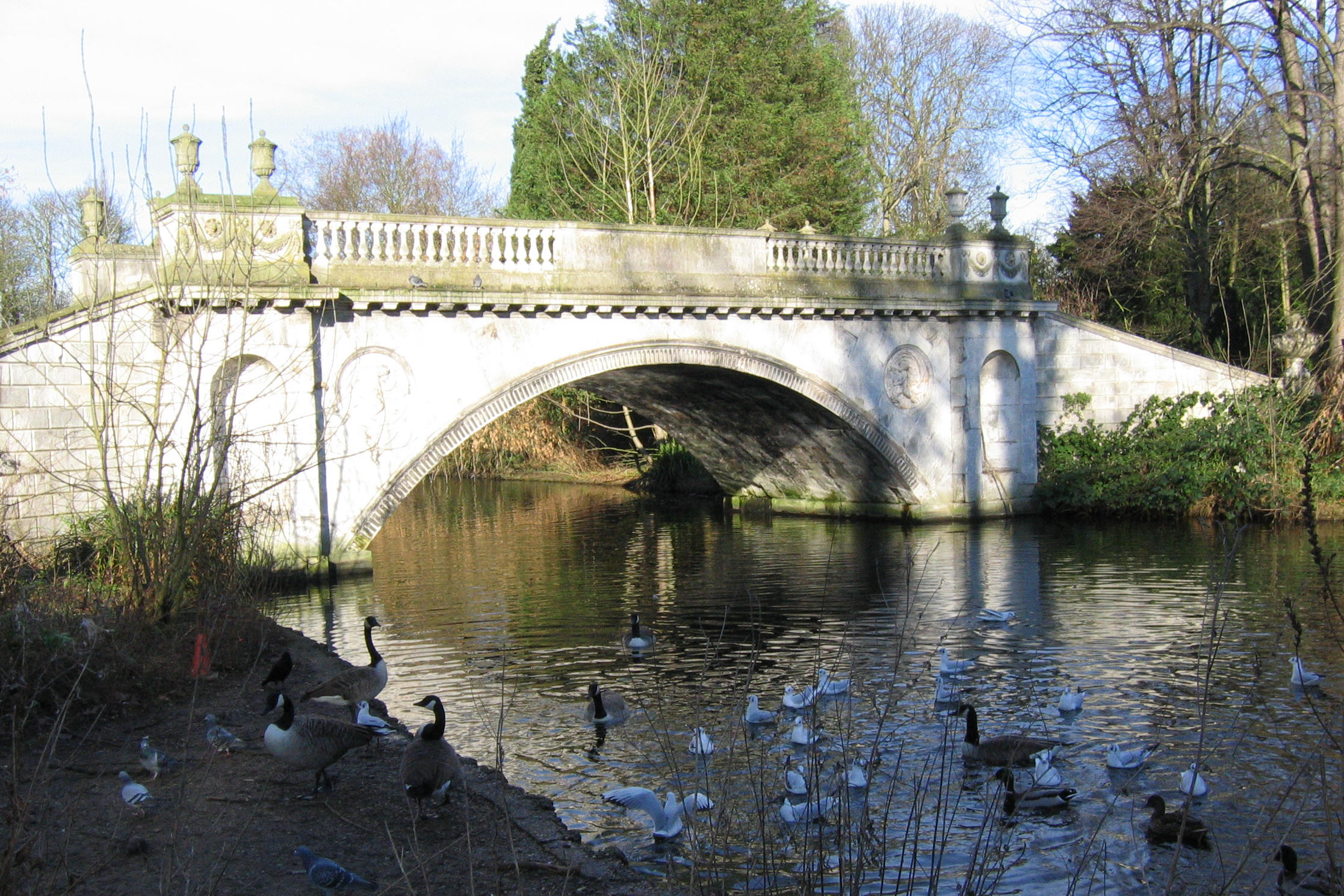
The lake in Chiswick House grounds, formerly one of the westernmost lower channels of the brook system

Stamford Brook was a tributary of the Tideway stretch of the River Thames in west London supplied by three headwaters. Historically used as an irrigation ditch or dyke, the network of small watercourses had four lower courses and mouths.

== History ==
=== Etymology ===
The name Stamford Brook may be a corruption of "stony ford", for a crossing by King Street. It has given its name to the surrounding area between Hammersmith and Chiswick, and to the local London Underground station, Stamford Brook.

The county of London created in 1889 was bounded by the westernmost course of Stamford Brook; it formed the boundary separating London Boroughs of Hammersmith and Acton in the new county from the Chiswick and Brentford Urban Districts in Middlesex.

By 1900, all six strands of the brook and drainage dykes had been covered over and formed the most useful depressions available to site the neighbourhood's sewers, and many diversionary surface water drains had been created closer to the surface to drain the catchment basin.

== Disambiguation ==
Stamford Brook has no known connection with Stamford Bridge, the site of a bridge which carries the Kings Road over the stream to the east called Counter's Creek which rose to the immediate west of Notting Hill. The West London bridge gives its name to Chelsea Football Club's adjoining ground.

== Course ==
=== Headwaters ===
A western headwater, the Bollo Brook or Bollar Brook was the westernmost brook feeding the channels running through Chiswick and Hammersmith. This rose on the site of Ealing Common Underground station, midway between Ealing and Acton and travelled south, then southeast, then divided, part was channelled south to Chiswick House and Chiswick; the remainder was channelled into four mouths described below. The main flow travelled east to the north of King Street, Hammersmith.

Surface water and foul water drains beside and under short stretches of Piccadilly and District lines (Note: Both lines directly west of houses on "Bollo Lane" (see maps)) followed by the rear of numbers up to 438 Chiswick High Road, then turn ENE follow the lowest depression of that watercourse, cutting across Chiswick Common, crossing the District Line at Turnham Green tube station to reach the formerly seasonally waterlogged, low-lying area of Stamford Brook Common. (Note: This is no longer normally true of the common due to its size and surface water drains in place; the elevation of the west of it however is 4.7m AOD, lower than to its southeast - historically it was a very small, far detached part of Ealing parish)

Fresh water features such as the fishponds by the London Transport Museum Depot on the current location of Acton Town Underground station have been lost due to use of the depression for separate drainage systems.

An eastern headwater rose on Old Oak Common in Acton. north east of the Old Acton Wells, also known as Acton Wells (Note: Acton Wells occupies the industrial building in Victoria Road behind Wells House Road, Acton, London) and flowed south down Old Oak Common Road and Old Oak Road then SSE down Askew Road. (Note: The modern sewer's discharge is at south of Askew Road where it meets Joseph Bazalgette's Middle Level Sewer running along Bath/Goldhawk Road) This course, now overtaken by segregation of surface water drainage and sanitary sewers afterwards ran the line of Paddenswick Road where it was joined by a flow emerging from Ravenscourt Park.

A middle headwater formed in North Acton near the interchange of the A40 and was known locally as the "Warple" — this ran southwards just west of Horn Lane, under the park Springfield Gardens turned east underneath the small park, The Woodlands by Ealing, Hammersmith and West London College in Acton, ran south of Acton High Street/the Vale behind the long-established swimming location fed from the mineral wells above, Acton Swimming Baths, then ran south down Warple Way where toward the end of this road is a large sewage storage and pumping station. After this the brook split at The Brook public house on Stamford Brook Common. One branch from this point headed east past Ravenscourt Park and fed the former moat there.

== Mouths ==
From Paddenswick Road by Ravenscourt Park the original and middle mouth took a due south route along Dalling Road, (Note: Dalling Road's southern section) under King Street and through Hammersmith Registry Office, Cromwell Avenue to the River Thames. This mouth, once providing high tide mooring was known as Hammersmith Creek.

The eastern mouth, Parr's Ditch was a more complicated, field-watering affair, an alternative brook as the main area inconveniently for agriculture overflowed at times and for irrigation of Hammersmith, that continued due east through Hammersmith into a natural trough, now the long park known as Brook Green. To reach this long green, a line parallel to Attwood and Kilmarsh Roads was taken, after Brook Green the route turned south and then southwest and took Collet Gardens, Wilson and Yeldham Roads to reach the Thames.

A ditch of the western channel was funnelled to the southern depression of parkland in Chiswick to augment the waters in the grounds of Chiswick House. Its main supply the Hazeldene ran from a lake near Sydney House (Note: Sydney House is demolished) to the west. The waters feed the lakes and fountains at Chiswick House, and then drain into the River Thames downstream of Barnes Bridge An additional western channel was added from Stamford Green, running underneath Stamford Brook Avenue and British Grove. Accordingly, elevations of Stamford Brook Avenue range from 4.8 to 5 metres (16 to 16 ft) whereas east in Ravensbourne Park, the destination of the stream depicted in early maps, the elevations are 4.4 to 4.2 metres (14 to 14 ft) AOB by Paddeswick Road.

Close to the River Thames, the lower reaches of the above routes used for sanitary sewers are intercepted by Sir Joseph Bazalgette's Northern Low Level Sewer which reaches the Northern Outfall Sewer in Stratford, however directly south of the original mouth are overflow outfalls in Furnival Gardens and of the western mouth on Chiswick Eyot which regularly are in use during rainy days, leading to a major project underway, the Thames Tideway Scheme, a strong motivation for which is the desire to comply with the EU's Urban Waste Water Treatment Directive.

Audacious plans in 2008 were proposed by a firm of architects whose chief vision was to recreate a marshy stream at the Walbrook, as in pre-Roman London, to recreate Hammersmith Creek in Hammersmith by putting the A4 underground. City planners consider however that while extra water provides a few expensive views for residents, it does not provide recreational or air quality improving space.

== See also ==
- Tributaries of the River Thames
- Subterranean rivers of London
- List of rivers in England

== Notes and references ==
Notes

Next confluence upstream	River Thames	Next confluence downstream
River Brent (north)	Stamford Brook	Beverley Brook (south)
