= High Green, Worcestershire =

Hamlet in Worcestershire, England

Coordinates: 52.1045°N 2.1860°W

High Green
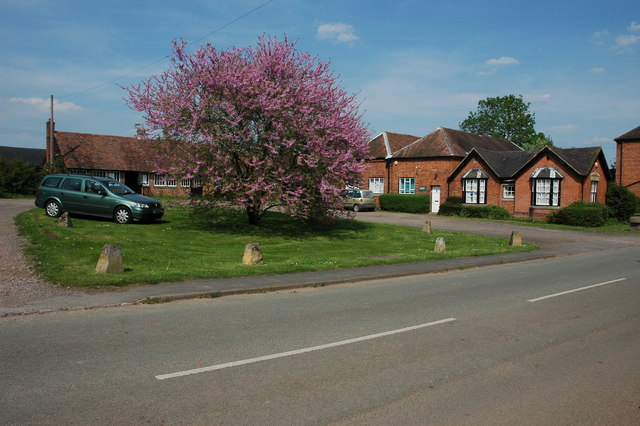
- Croome Estate Office

- Location within Worcestershire
- OS grid reference: SO867454
- District: Malvern Hills
- Shire county: Worcestershire
- Region: West Midlands
- Country: England
- Sovereign state: United Kingdom
- Post town: WORCESTER
- Postcode district: WR8
- Police: West Mercia
- Fire: Hereford and Worcester
- Ambulance: West Midlands

High Green is a village in Worcestershire, England.
