= High Cross, Truro =

Square in Truro, Cornwall, UK

Coordinates: 50.2641°N 5.0520°W

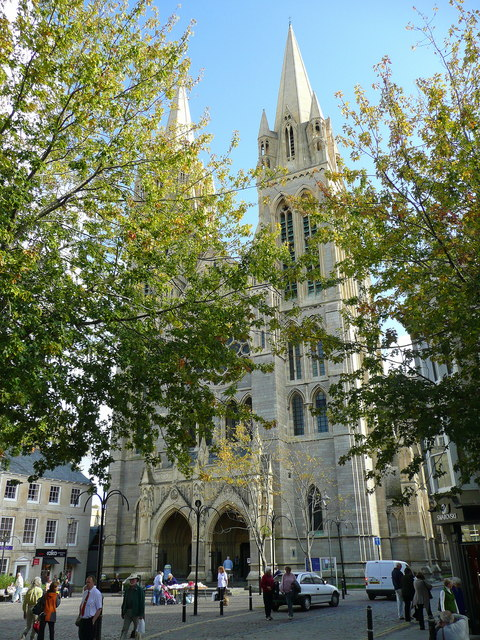
High Cross

High Cross is a cobbled plaza in Truro, Cornwall, England, UK, in front of the west face of Truro Cathedral. It is at the junction of Pydar Street, King Street, and St Mary's Street.

The plaza is extensively dotted with floral hanging baskets during the summer and is the site of Truro's Christmas tree during the festive season.

One building on High Cross has certain significance; the Georgian Assembly Rooms building, a Warrens Bakery store until March 2020, was built in 1789 and was the centre of Truro's high society, containing the Old Assembly Halls and also a theater. There are two busts above the first floor windows, one of the actor and theatrical producer David Garrick, and the other of William Shakespeare.

The cobbles in High Cross were concreted over when Queen Elizabeth II visited the city in the 1970s, and they were restored afterwards.

A multi-storey car park nearby has the name "High Cross". The area has also been noted for its high number of anti-social behaviour incidents.

== Celtic cross ==
At the edge of the square near Pydar Street, there is an ancient, Grade II-listed Celtic cross, unearthed during a development project in the city. A cross in Truro was mentioned in a document of 1290. In 1958 during excavations in St Nicholas Street the upper section of a stone cross was found and placed next to the museum.

In 1981 it was erected outside the Marks and Spencer store. After it had been extended with a piece of Hantergantick granite it was re-erected at High Cross in 1988 and dedicated in 1992. It is likely that the cross originally at High Cross was a Gothic Latin cross and that this cross was originally a simple wayside cross. In February 2019, it was broken into four pieces after a car crashed into it. It was restored and, in December 2019, placed back at High Cross.

== Gallery ==
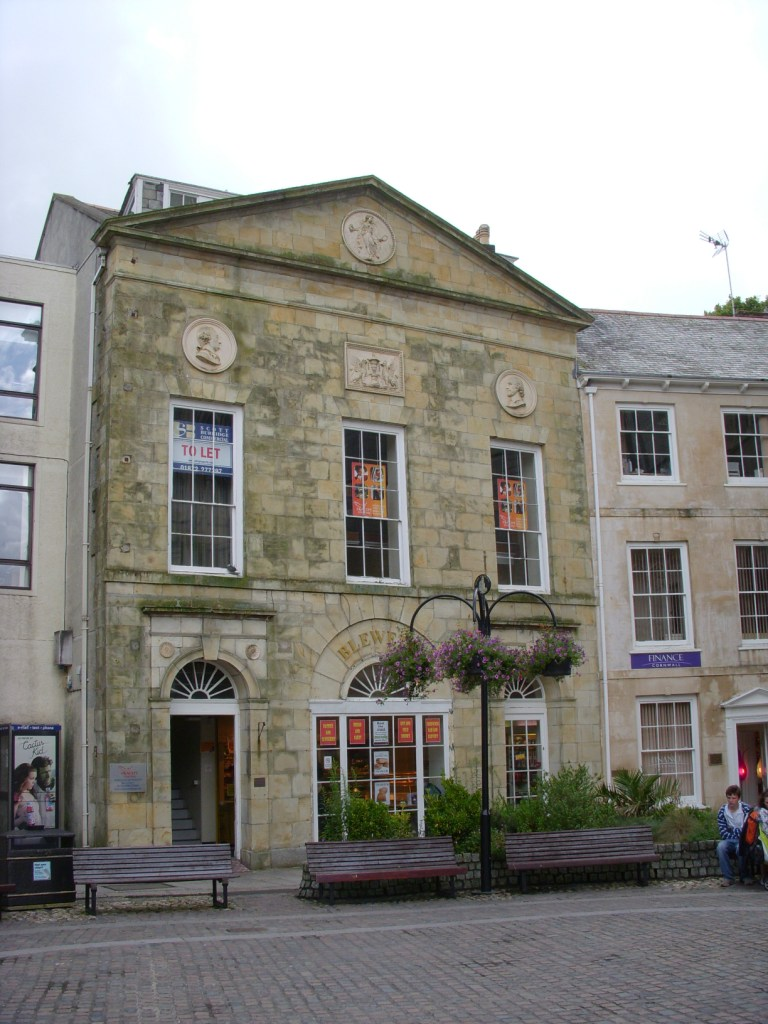
The Assembly Rooms building

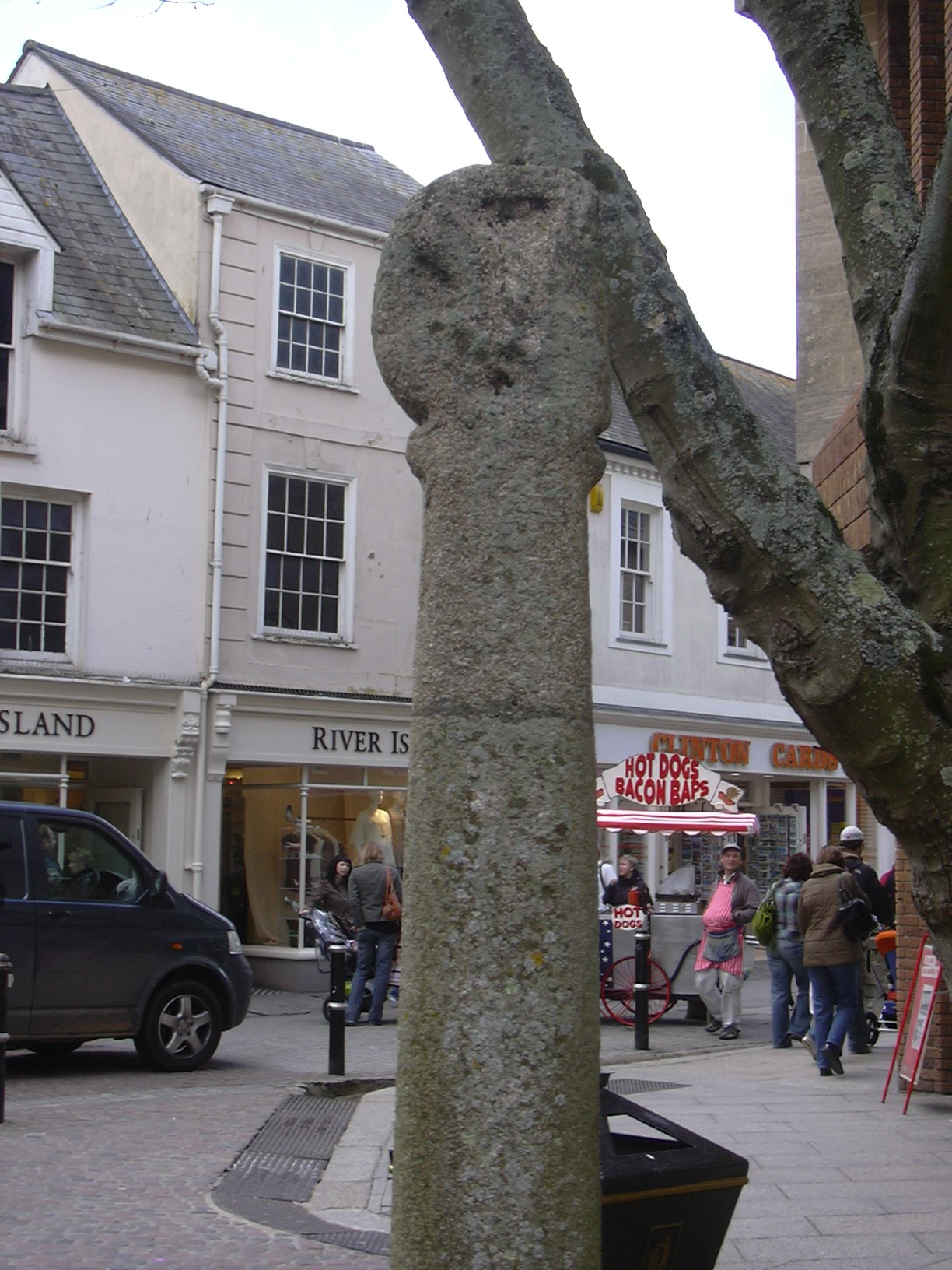
The ancient Celtic cross opposite the Cathedral
