= High Cross, Constantine =

Hamlet in south Cornwall, England

Coordinates: 50°07′N 5°09′W

High Cross is a hamlet in south Cornwall, England, United Kingdom. It is situated one mile east of Constantine (where the 2011 population was included.) village and approximately four miles (6 km) southwest of Falmouth.

High Cross is in the civil parish of Constantine, Cornwall. In 1993 a medieval stone cross was found built into a collapsing Cornish hedge at the junction of the road from Constantine to Penryn and the road from Mawnan Smith. The cross was re-erected nearby, at the crossroad, in April 2000.
